= Cephalopod size =

Body variation

The giant squid (Architeuthis dux, pictured) was for a long time thought to be the largest extant cephalopod. It is now known that the colossal squid (Mesonychoteuthis hamiltoni) attains an even greater maximum size. The giant squid seen here measured 9.24 m (30.3 ft) in total length and had a mantle length of 1.79 m (5.9 ft).

Cephalopods, which include squids and octopuses, vary enormously in size. The smallest are only about 1 centimetre (0.39 in) long and weigh less than 1 gram (0.035 oz) at maturity, while the giant squid can exceed 10 metres (33 ft) in length and the colossal squid can weigh almost 500 kilograms (1,100 lb) or more, making them the largest living invertebrates. Living species range in mass more than three-billion-fold, (Note: The heaviest scientifically validated cephalopod specimen was a colossal squid (Mesonychoteuthis hamiltoni) weighing 495 kg (1,091 lb), while hatchlings of Illex illecebrosus—some of the smallest known—have a mass of around 0.00015 g (5.3×10^{−6} oz). The mass ratio between the two is $\left ( \frac{495,000}{0.00015} \right ) = 3,300,000,000$. Comparing only adult females, the difference between the colossal squid and the pygmy squid Idiosepius thailandicus—which weighs 0.20 g (0.0071 oz) at maturity—would be $\left ( \frac{495,000}{0.2} \right ) = 2,475,000$.) or across nine orders of magnitude, from the lightest hatchlings to the heaviest adults. Certain cephalopod species are also noted for having individual body parts of exceptional size.

Cephalopods were at one time the largest of all organisms on Earth, and numerous species of comparable size to the largest present day squids are known from the fossil record, including enormous examples of ammonoids, belemnoids, nautiloids, orthoceratoids, teuthids, and vampyromorphids. In terms of mass, the largest of all known cephalopods were likely the giant shelled ammonoids and endocerid nautiloids, though perhaps still second to the largest living cephalopods when considering tissue mass alone.

Cephalopods vastly larger than either giant or colossal squids have been postulated at various times. One of these was the St. Augustine Monster, a large carcass weighing several tonnes that washed ashore on the United States coast near St. Augustine, Florida, in 1896. Reanalyses in 1995 and 2004 of the original tissue samples—together with those of other similar carcasses—showed conclusively that they were all masses of the collagenous matrix of whale blubber.

Giant cephalopods have fascinated humankind for ages. The earliest surviving records are perhaps those of Aristotle and Pliny the Elder, both of whom described squids of very large size. Tales of giant squid have been common among mariners since ancient times, and may have inspired the monstrous kraken of Nordic legend, said to be as large as an island and capable of engulfing and sinking any ship. Similar tentacled sea monsters are known from other parts of the globe, including the Akkorokamui of Japan and Te Wheke-a-Muturangi of New Zealand. The Lusca of the Caribbean and Scylla in Greek mythology may also derive from giant squid sightings, as might eyewitness accounts of other sea monsters such as sea serpents.

Cephalopods of enormous size have featured prominently in fiction. Some of the best known examples include the giant squid from Jules Verne's 1870 novel Twenty Thousand Leagues Under the Seas and its various film adaptations; the giant octopus from the 1955 monster movie It Came from Beneath the Sea; and the giant squid from Peter Benchley's 1991 novel Beast and the TV film adaptation of the same name.

Due to its status as a charismatic megafaunal species, the giant squid has been proposed as an emblematic animal for marine invertebrate conservation. Life-sized models of the giant squid are a common sight in natural history museums around the world, and preserved specimens are much sought after for display.

== Size in teuthology ==
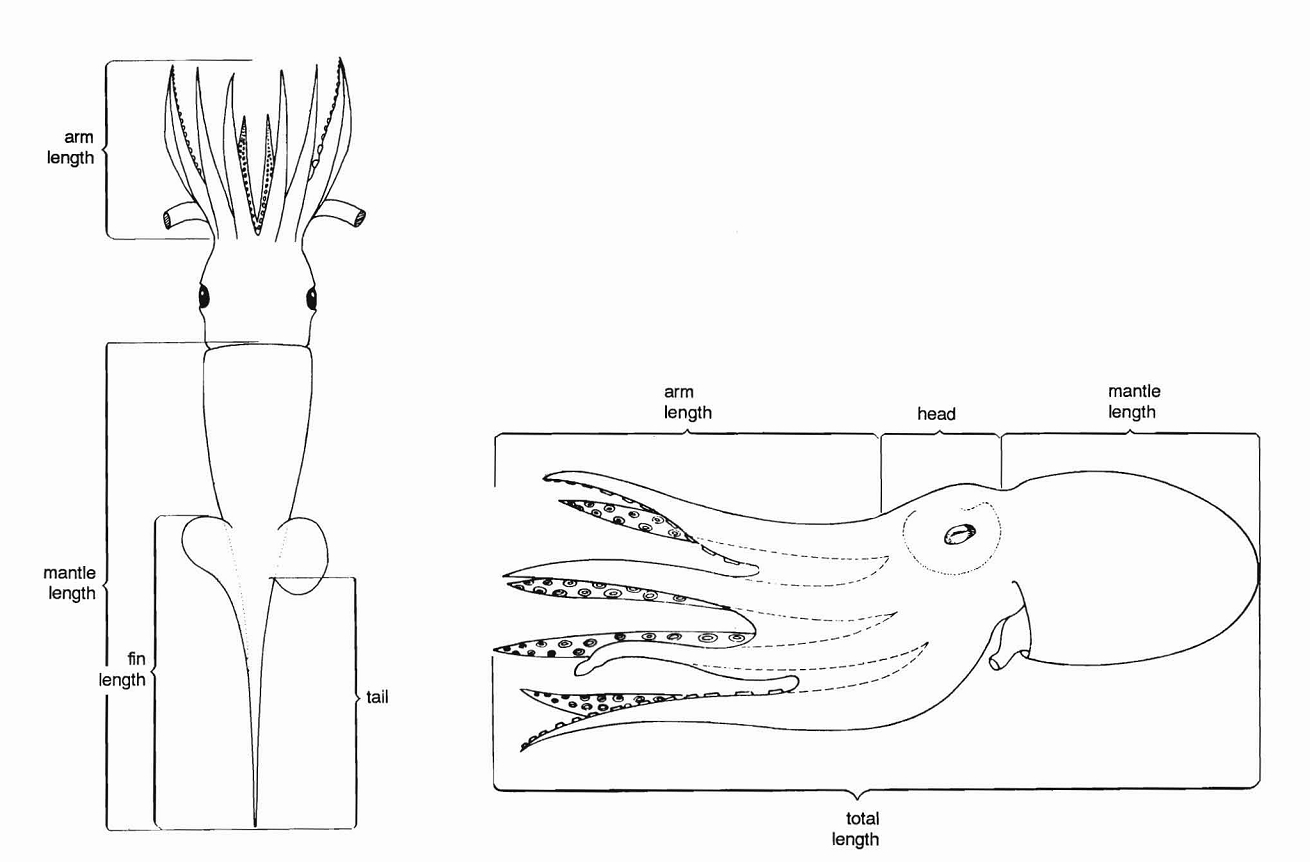
Standard measurements for cephalopods with a squid and octopus as examples

=== Mantle length ===
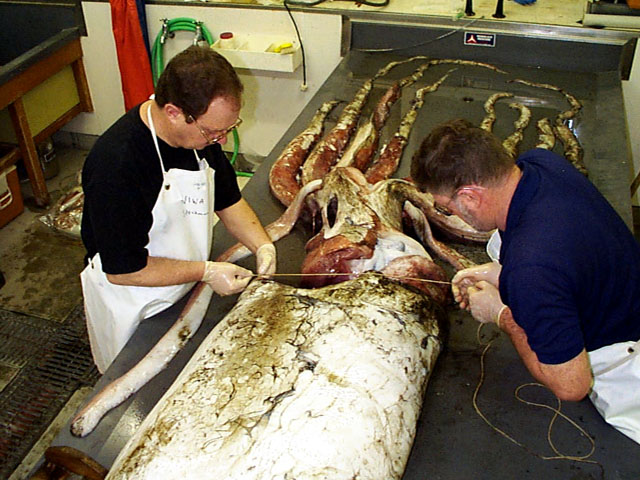
Scientists measuring the mantle width of a large female giant squid of c. 2 m (6.6 ft) ML

Mantle length (ML) is the standard size measure for coleoid cephalopods (shell diameter being more common for nautiluses) and is almost universally reported in the scientific literature. The mantle is the cephalopod's "body", lying posterior to the head and enclosing the visceral mass and mantle cavity, the latter being used for locomotion by jet propulsion. Unless otherwise indicated, mantle length is measured dorsally over the midline of the mantle (sometimes specified as dorsal mantle length, DML). It is a straight-line measure, not measured over the curve of the body. In Decapodiformes (ten-limbed cephalopods), mantle length is measured from the anterior edge of the mantle (near the head), to the posterior end of the mantle or the apex of the united fins, whichever is longer. In Octopodiformes (eight-limbed cephalopods), the anterior edge of the mantle is not clearly delimited dorsally due to advanced head–mantle fusion, and mantle length is therefore taken from the midpoint between the eyes to the posterior end of the mantle. When ventral mantle length is meant instead of dorsal this is always specified as such and abbreviated VML.

As an indication of overall size, mantle length is generally considered more reliable than total length because cephalopod limbs may easily be stretched beyond their natural length and are often damaged or missing in preserved specimens (this is particularly true of the long tentacles of many squid species). Nevertheless, mantle length is not equally applicable to all species. Certain benthic octopuses such as Callistoctopus ornatus are able to elongate and retract their mantles and therefore mantle length measurements, even when taken from a live specimen, may vary considerably. Another problematic case is that of the gelatinous cirroteuthids, whose weakly muscled mantles are prone to substantial shrinkage during preservation. The interocular distance may be a more reliable standard for this group.

=== Total length ===
Total length (TL) is measured along the dorsal midline with the limbs outstretched and in line with the body axis. It is the greatest measurable extent of a specimen from the posterior end of the mantle or fins (or tail, if present) to the apex of the longest limb. It is recommended that arms and tentacles be measured in a relaxed state so as not to exaggerate their length, but historically this practice was not always followed and some of the more extreme published giant squid measurements have been attributed to artificial lengthening of the tentacles. Although total length is often mentioned in relation to the largest cephalopod species, it is otherwise seldom used in teuthology. As with mantle length, it is a straight-line measure.

Total length is not to be confused with arm span—also known as arm spread, radial span, or radial spread—which may be much larger and is often reported for octopuses (for which the arms usually constitute the vast majority of the length). In squids, total length is inclusive of the feeding tentacles, which in some species may be longer than the mantle, head, and arms combined (chiroteuthids such as Asperoteuthis acanthoderma being a prime example).

A related measure is standard length (SL), which is the combined length of the mantle, head, and arms, excluding the often long feeding tentacles. This measure is particularly useful for species such as the giant squid, where almost the entire bulk of the animal takes up less than half of its total length.

=== Mass ===
Mass (often abbreviated WT for 'weight') is reported far less frequently than either mantle or total length, and accurate records do not exist for all of the large cephalopod species. It can also vary widely depending on the state of the specimen at the time of weighing (for example, whether it was measured live or dead, wet or dry, frozen or thawed, pre- or post-fixation, with or without egg mass, and so on).

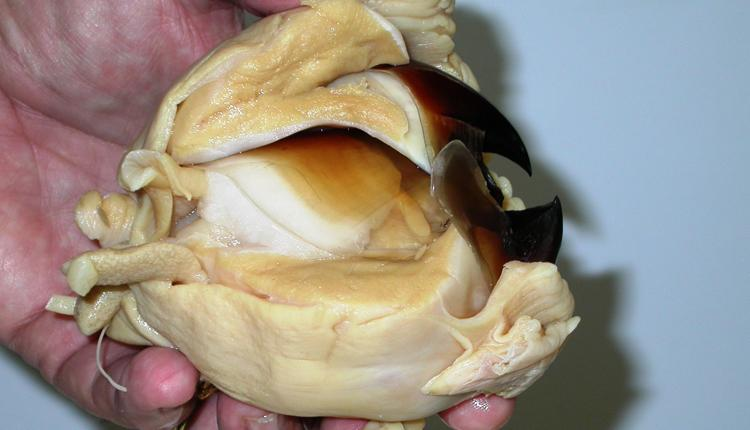
Giant squid beak and associated muscles with hand for scale

=== Methods of size determination ===
In contrast to the vast majority of living cephalopods, which are wholly soft-bodied, size determination of the few surviving shelled species (in terms of shell diameter) is comparatively straightforward and can be accomplished with a high level of precision. Whatever the type of cephalopod, in the absence of whole specimens, size can often be estimated from only partial remains. For example, cephalopod beaks can be used for mantle length, total length and body mass estimation, and this method has notably been used to estimate the maximum size of the colossal squid. The lower rostral length (LRL) of the beak is often used for this purpose. The rostral length of the lower and upper beaks is the standard measure of beak size in Decapodiformes; hood length is preferred for Octopodiformes.

Mantle length has been estimated from video recordings of squid in the wild.

== Early life stages ==
=== Hatchlings ===
Hatchlings of Idiosepius thailandicus, possibly the smallest extant cephalopod species at maturity, have a mantle length of around 1 mm (0.039 in). The closely related Idiosepius pygmaeus weighs only 0.00033 g (1.2×10^{−5} oz) upon hatching and increases in weight to 0.175 g (0.0062 oz) as it reaches maturity in 50 days. Even smaller are the hatchlings of the commercially important Illex illecebrosus, with a mass of 0.00015 g (5.3×10^{−6} oz). Hatchlings of the giant Pacific octopus (Enteroctopus dofleini)—one of the two largest octopus species—weigh 0.0253 g (0.00089 oz) on average.

At the other extreme are nautiluses, which upon hatching typically have a shell diameter of 25 mm (1 in) or more (depending on the species), the largest hatchling size among extant invertebrates. Hatchlings of Nautilus belauensis, one of the larger species, are estimated to weigh on the order of 5.9 g (0.21 oz) (Note: Wood & O'Dor (2000:93) elaborated on this mass estimate as follows: There are [...] no published weights of hatchling Nautilus spp. The weight of a hatchling N. belauensis was estimated using hatchling shell size and a regression analysis of the cubed shell diameter versus the weight of seven young N. belauensis that weighed <50 g [1.8 oz] [...] in addition to a single hatchling N. pompilius that was weighed for the present study on 24 April 1996 at the Waikiki Aquarium. The hatchling N. pompilius weighing 4.33 g [0.153 oz], with a maximum shell diameter of 26.25 mm [1.033 in], fit a highly significant correlation [...] between cubed shell diameter and weight, which indicates that a hatchling N. belauensis with a 30 mm [1.2 in] shell diameter [...] would weigh approximately 5.9 g [0.21 oz].) and mature at around 1.2 kg (2.6 lb) after almost 4000 days, or around 11 years.

== Smallest adult size ==
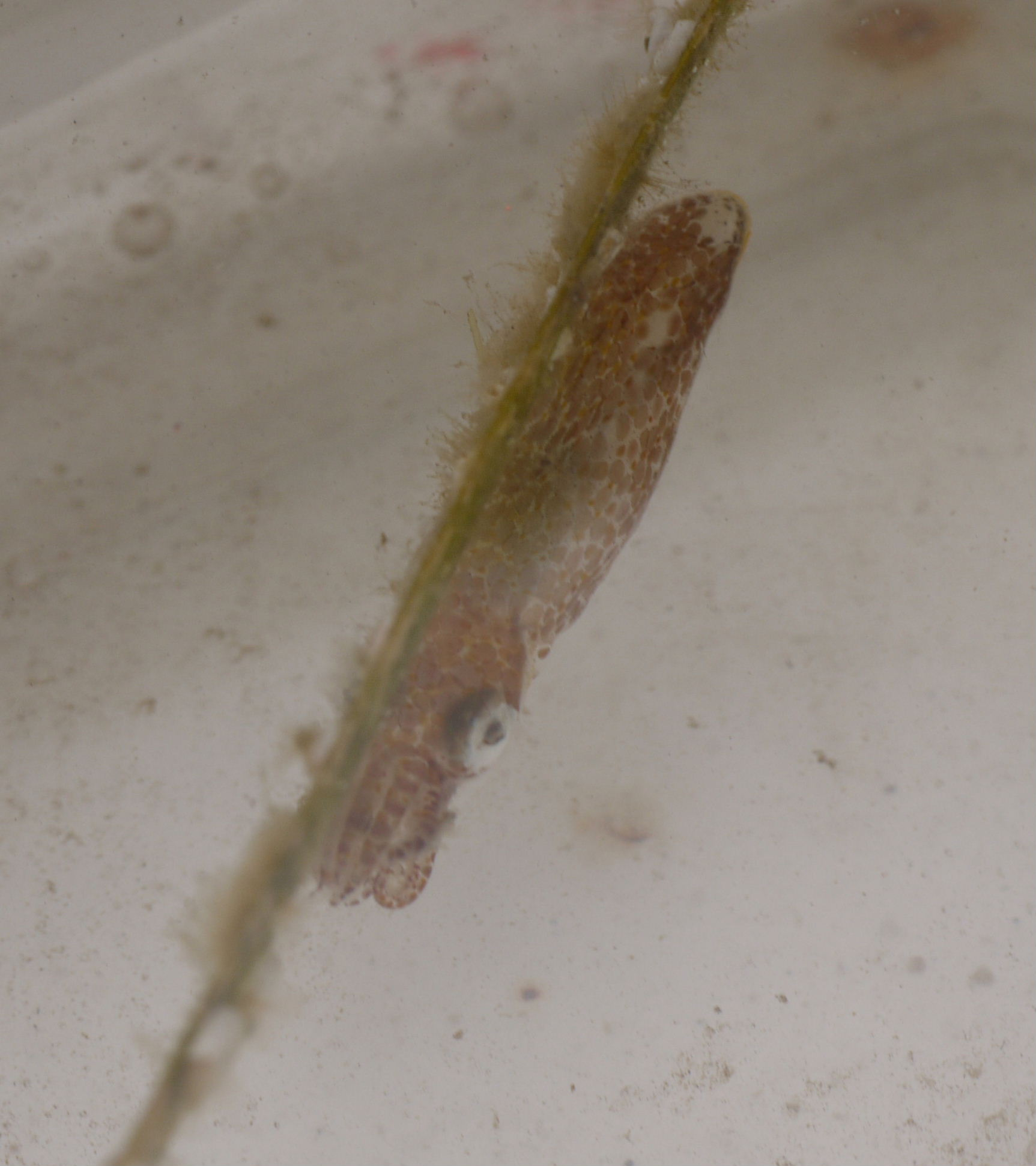
Idiosepius paradoxus, a tiny species of squid that grows to 16 mm (0.63 in) in mantle length

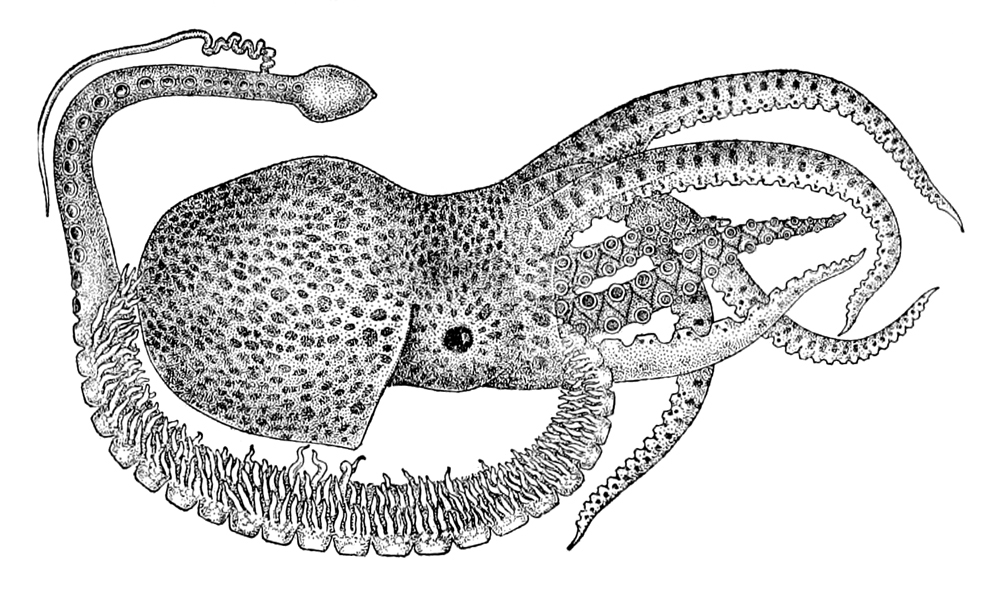
Adult male Tremoctopus violaceus with large hectocotylus (arm modified for spermatophore transfer)

The smallest adult size among living cephalopods is attained by the so-called pygmy squids, Idiosepius, and certain diminutive species of the genus Octopus, both of which weigh less than 1 gram (0.035 oz) at maturity. Idiosepius thailandicus is perhaps the smallest of all, with females averaging 10.4 mm (0.41 in) in mantle length and males 5.9 mm (0.23 in). Average wet weights are around 0.20 and 0.02 g (0.00705 and 0.00071 oz), respectively.

Other tiny species include members of the bobtail squid family Sepiolidae; the myopsid squid genera Australiteuthis and Pickfordiateuthis; the oegopsid squid genera Abralia and Abraliopsis; the pygmy cuttlefish Sepia pulchra; and the ram's horn squid, Spirula spirula.

=== Male dwarfism ===
The octopod superfamily Argonautoidea is characterised by markedly dwarfed males. The four extant genera of the group are Argonauta, Haliphron, Ocythoe, and Tremoctopus, all of which are exclusively pelagic. The greatest disparity in the size of the sexes is seen in the blanket octopuses of the genus Tremoctopus. Norman et al. (2002) reported a fully mature male Tremoctopus violaceus measuring 2.4 cm (0.94 in) in total length and weighing a mere 0.25 g (0.0088 oz). By comparison, the large females of this species reach total lengths of 2 m (6.6 ft) and probably some 10 kg (22 lb) in weight. This is the most extreme sexual size dimorphism known among non-microscopic animals, (Note: Norman et al. (2002:733) wrote: "The most extreme examples of sexual size dimorphism come from marine or parasitic taxa where females are difficult to locate (Ghiselin 1974).") with mature females being at least 10,000 times longer than males, and likely up to 40,000 times heavier. The related genera Argonauta and Ocythoe have similarly small males, but the females are not nearly as large as those of Tremoctopus, and the size dimorphism is therefore less pronounced. The females of the fourth argonautoid genus, Haliphron, are the largest of all up to length of 3.5 m (11 ft) and mass of 75 kg (165 lb) (and possibly the largest octopuses of any kind), but the males are also much larger, at up to 30 cm (12 in). So, the size dimorphism is least pronounced of all.

=== Extinct taxa ===
Numerous species of so-called micromorphic ammonites are known. Maximites from the Upper Carboniferous is the smallest known ammonoid. Adult specimens reached only 10 mm (0.39 in) in shell diameter.

== Maximum size ==
=== Scientifically validated records ===
The largest cephalopod specimen ever recorded: a 495 kg (1,091 lb) colossal squid

Squids are the largest living cephalopods in terms of each of mantle length, total length, and mass, with the largest species by at least two of these measures being the colossal squid, Mesonychoteuthis hamiltoni. Reaching an estimated 3 m (9.8 ft) in mantle length and 10 m (33 ft) in total length, and weighing as much as 495 kg (1,091 lb), this species is also the largest of all extant invertebrates. The only other squid that approaches these dimensions is the giant squid of the genus Architeuthis, with females up to 275 kg (606 lb), 2.4 m (7.9 ft) in mantle length, and possibly as much as 15 m (49 ft) in total length, making it likely the longest of all cephalopods. The two largest octopus species—Enteroctopus dofleini and Haliphron atlanticus—can both exceed 70 kg (150 lb), and the former has a maximum total length of more than 6 m (20 ft). Cirrate (finned) octopods can also reach a large size, with the largest captured specimen likely being a Cirrothauma magna of 1.7 m (5.6 ft) total length and 33 cm (13 in) mantle length, though observations from submersibles suggest that members of this group can exceed 4 m (13 ft) in total length.

Members of the other cephalopod groups are substantially smaller, although the largest cuttlefish can exceed 10 kg (22 lb) in weight and 50 cm (1.6 ft) in mantle length. Cephalopods of comparable size to the largest present day squid are known from fossil remains, including enormous examples of ammonoids, belemnoids, nautiloids, orthoceratoids, teuthids, and vampyromorphids.

==== Colossal squid (Mesonychoteuthis hamiltoni) ====
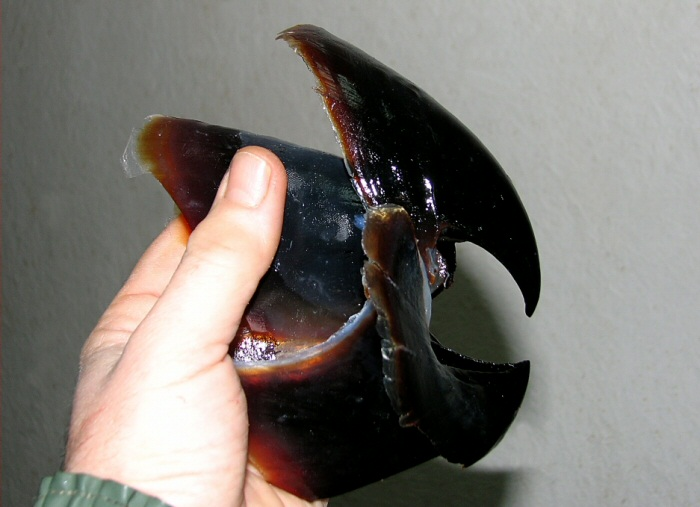
Beak of a colossal squid, which has the largest beak among living cephalopods

Though a substantial number of colossal squid (Mesonychoteuthis hamiltoni) remains have been recorded (Xavier et al., 1999 collated 188 geographical positions for whole or partial specimens caught by commercial and scientific fisheries), very few adult or subadult animals have ever been documented, making it difficult to estimate the maximum size of the species. McClain et al. (2015) stated that only 12 "complete" specimens were known. The largest known complete specimen of the colossal squid was a mature female captured in the Ross Sea in February 2007. Its weight was initially estimated at 450 kg (990 lb), its mantle length at 4 m (13 ft), and its total length at 8–10 m (26–33 ft). Once completely thawed the specimen was found to weigh 495 kg (1,091 lb), but to measure only 2.5 m (8.2 ft) in mantle length and 4.2 m (14 ft) in total length. It is likely that the specimen, and particularly its tentacles, shrank considerably post mortem as a result of dehydration, having been kept in a freezer for 14 months. (As reported by the Museum of New Zealand Te Papa Tongarewa, specimens of Nototodarus sloanii, the New Zealand arrow squid, can shrink by as much as 22% when dehydrated with alcohol solutions.) The colossal squid specimen contracted by a further 5% after several years in preservative fluid (first formalin and later propylene glycol). The fins of the 2007 Ross Sea specimen measured around 1.2 m (3.9 ft) across and it had a mantle width of 98.2 cm (3.22 ft). The arms ranged in length from 0.85 to 1.15 m (2.8 to 3.8 ft), while the two tentacles were around 2.1 m (6.9 ft) long.

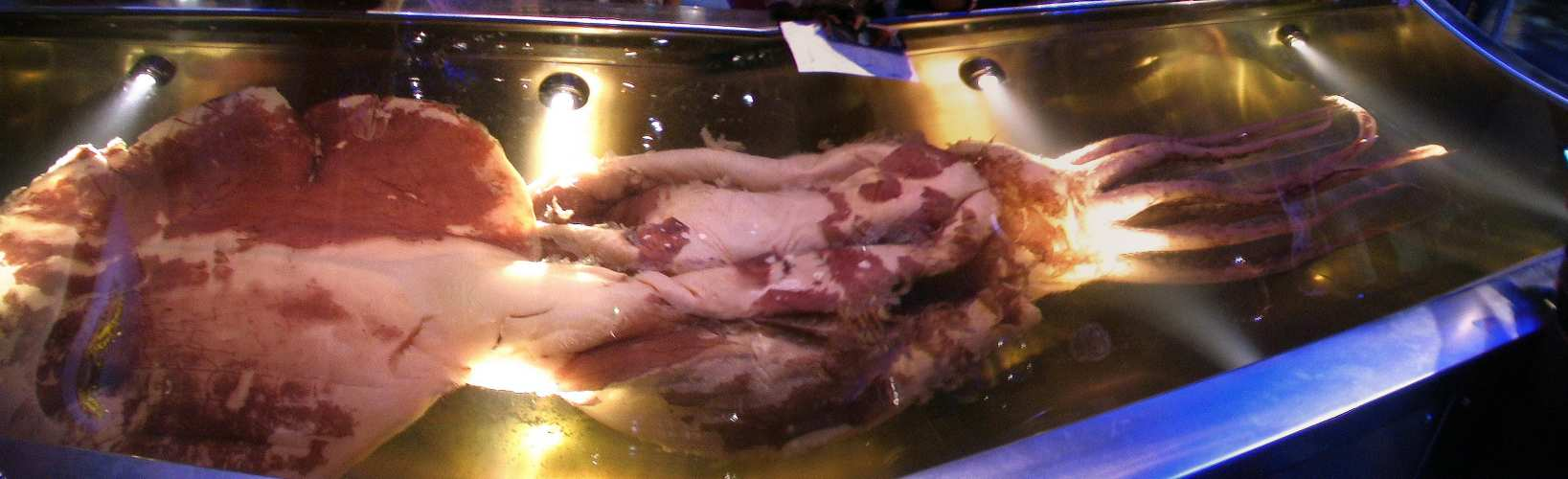
The 2007 Ross Sea specimen as it appears now, on display at the Museum of New Zealand Te Papa Tongarewa

Beaks recovered from sperm whale stomachs indicate the existence of animals surpassing even the 2007 Ross Sea specimen. That specimen had a lower rostral length (LRL) of 42.5 mm (1.67 in) and weighed 495 kg (1,091 lb), whereas the 300 kg (660 lb) submature female from 2003 had a LRL of 37 mm (1.5 in). By comparison, the largest known colossal squid beak from a sperm whale stomach measured 49 mm (1.9 in) in LRL. Though the number of large colossal squid specimens known to science is too small to get a good idea of the relationship between beak size and overall body size, a beak of such great size indicates a truly massive animal weighing perhaps as much as 600–700 kg (1,300–1,500 lb). However, the scaling relationship for this species shows considerable latitude, as demonstrated by a beak of 40 mm (1.6 in) LRL extracted from an animal weighing only 160 kg (350 lb).

==== Giant squid (Architeuthis dux) ====
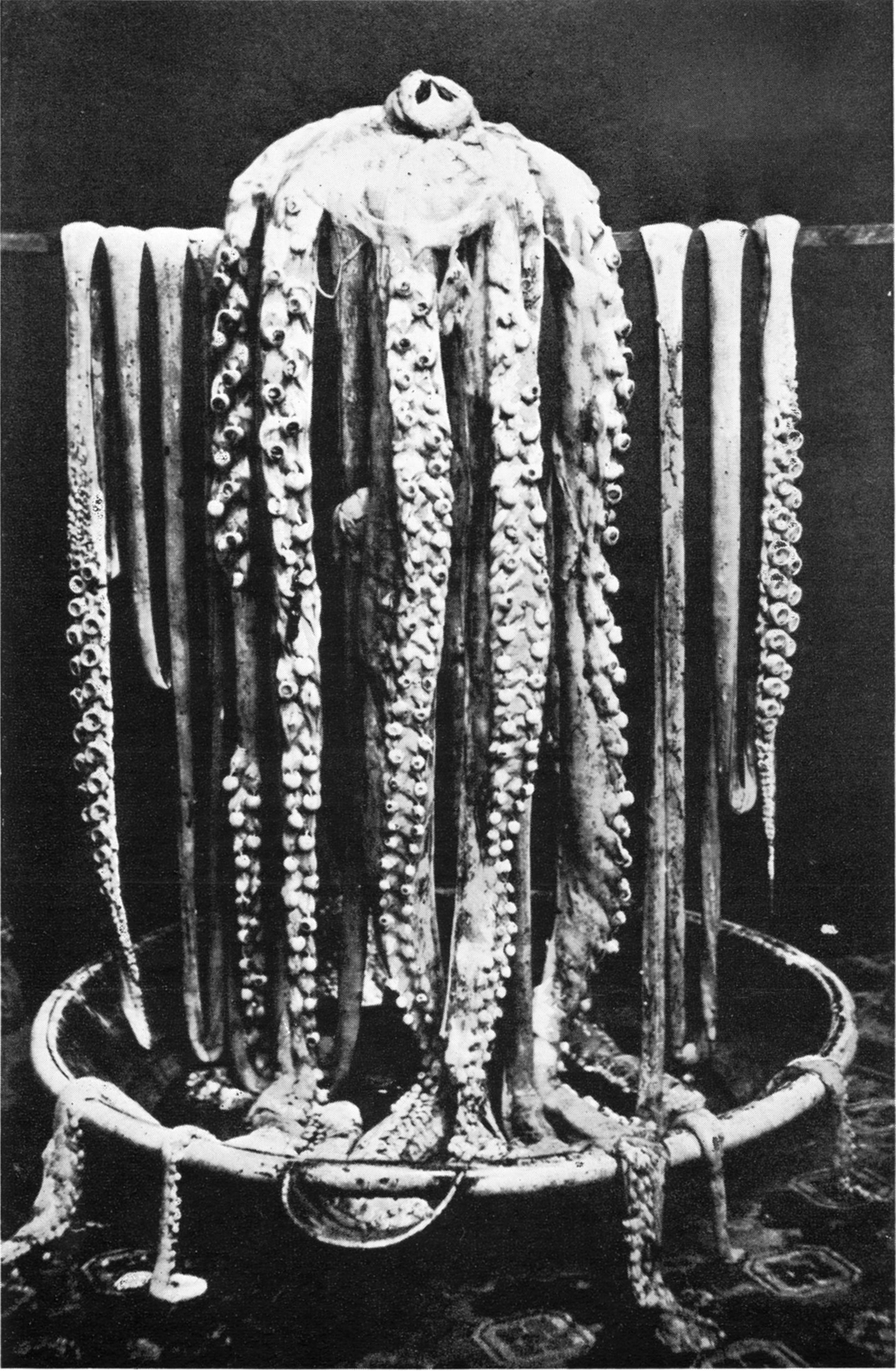
A giant squid specimen; the extremely long feeding tentacles of the giant squid make it the longest known cephalopod, past or present.

The maximum size of the giant squid (Architeuthis dux) has long been a subject of both popular debate and academic inquiry. Unlike the colossal squid, the giant squid is known from a substantial number of mature specimens. The total number of recorded specimens (across all developmental stages) approaches a thousand, with approximately 700 documented as of 2015, of which around 460 had been measured in some way. This number has since increased substantially, with 57 specimens recorded from Japanese waters during an exceptional 15-month period between 2014 and 2015.

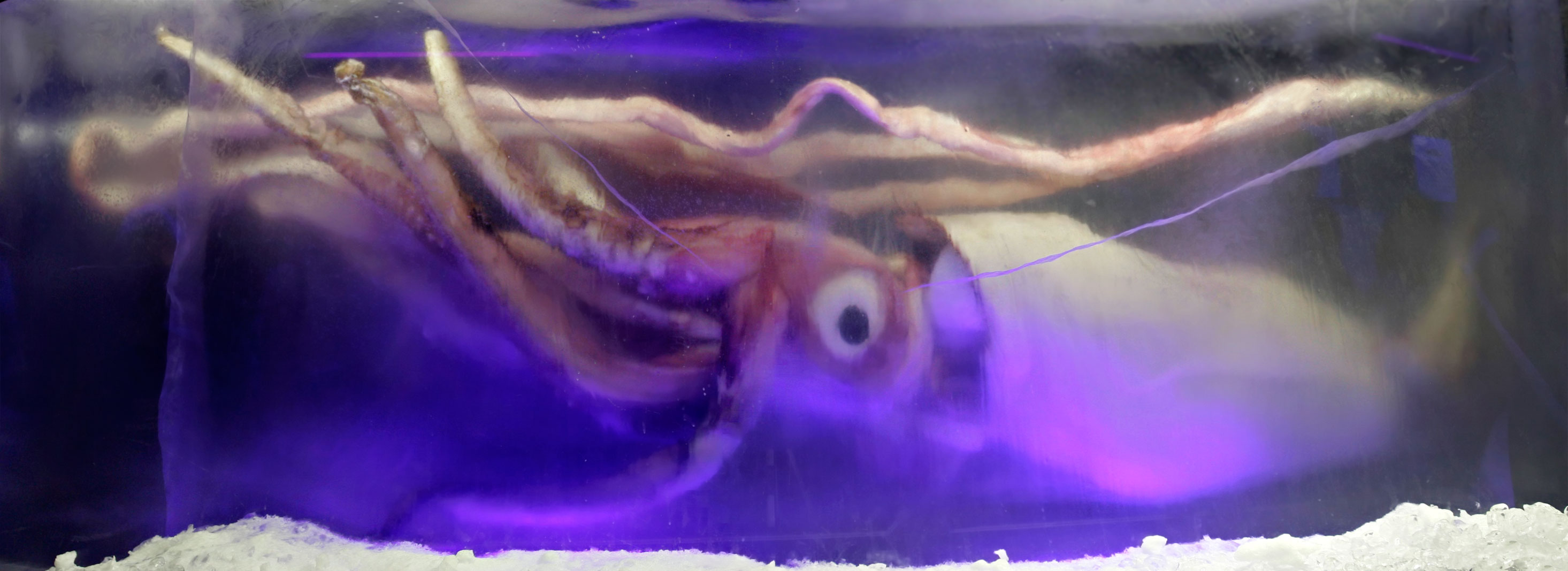
A giant squid measuring 7 m (23 ft) in total length and weighing 250 kg (550 lb) displayed in a 3.5-tonne (7,700 lb) block of ice at the Melbourne Aquarium

Based on a 40-year data set of more than 50 giant squid specimens, Roper & Shea (2013:114) suggest an average total length at maturity of 11 m (36 ft) and a "rarely encountered maximum length" of 14–15 m (46–49 ft). Of the nearly 100 specimens examined by Clyde Roper, the largest was "46 feet (14 m) long". O'Shea & Bolstad (2008) give a maximum total length of 13 m (43 ft) for females based on the examination of more than 130 specimens, measured post mortem and relaxed, as well as beaks recovered from sperm whales (which do not exceed the size of those found in the largest complete specimens). Steve O'Shea estimated the maximum total length for males at 10 m (33 ft). Older records of 18 m (59 ft) or more were likely exaggerated by stretching of the long feeding tentacles or resulted from inadequate measurement methods such as pacing. O'Shea has stated that, given the available evidence, the highest upper bound he would consider plausible for the giant squid's total length would be 15 m (49 ft), and that the likelihood that there exist 20-metre giant squid is "so exceedingly remote that you couldn't justify the effort in writing about it".

Including the head and arms but excluding the tentacles (standard length, SL), the species very rarely exceeds 5 m (16 ft) according to O'Shea & Bolstad (2008). Paxton (2016a) considers 9.45 m (31.0 ft) to be the greatest reliably measured SL, based on a specimen reported by Verrill (1880a:192), and considers specimens of 10 m (33 ft) SL or more to be "very probable", but these conclusions have been criticised by giant squid experts. O'Shea (2003a) put the maximum weight of female giant squid at 275 kg (606 lb), based on the examination of some 105 specimens as well as beaks recovered from sperm whales (which do not exceed the size of those found in the largest complete specimens). Giant squid are sexually size dimorphic, with the maximum weight for males estimated at 150 kg (330 lb), though heavier specimens have occasionally been reported (such as a 190 kg (420 lb) specimen and a 163 kg (359 lb) specimen). Roper & Jereb (2010a:121) give a maximum weight of up to 500 kg (1,100 lb), and "possibly greater". Discredited weights of as much as a tonne (2,200 lb) or more are not uncommon in older literature (see below).

==== Other squid taxa ====
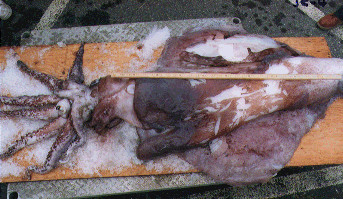
Dana octopus squid

The third-heaviest extant squid species is Taningia danae, also known as the Dana octopus squid. The largest well documented specimen is a 160 cm ML mature female reported by Roper & Vecchione (1993) from the North Atlantic. The original paper consistently gave the mass of this specimen as 61.4 kg (135 lb), but according to Roper & Jereb (2010h:266) this figure is wrong and stems from a typographical error, the correct mass being 161.4 kg (356 lb). Another similarly large specimen—a female weighing 124 kg (273 lb)—was reported from northern Spanish waters by González et al. (2003:297) (see also initial reports). In July 2010, a sperm whale was photographed off the Azorean island of Faial with a large squid—likely T. danae—in its mouth. The specimen's maximum width, from fin tip to fin tip, was estimated at 1.5–2 m (4.9–6.6 ft); this would approximate its mantle length.

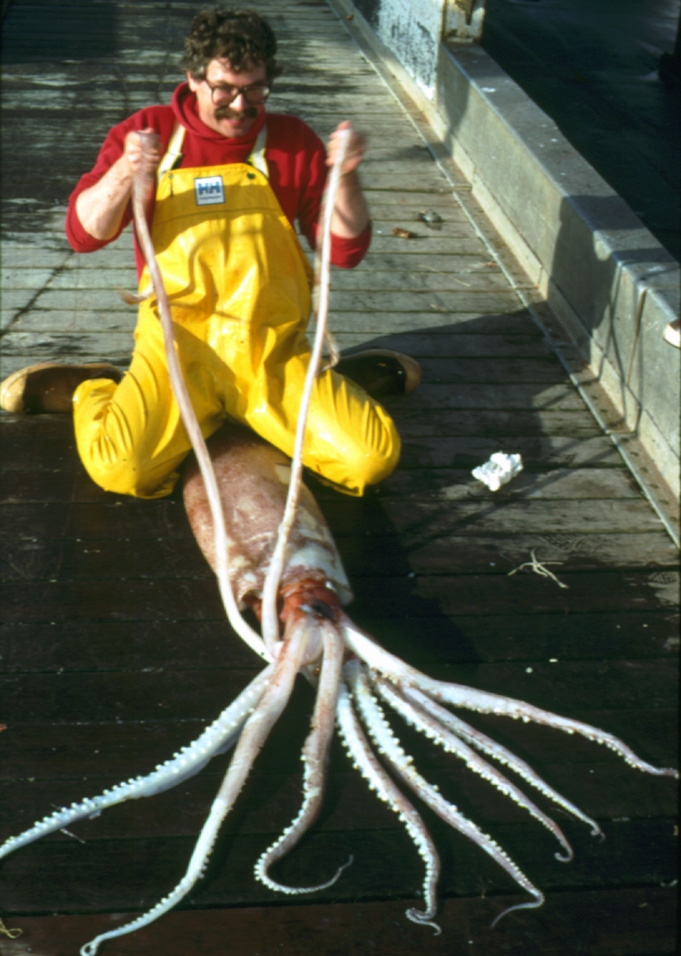
Onykia robusta grows to a mantle length of at least 2 m (6.6 ft)

Onykia robusta, previously known as Moroteuthis robusta and sometimes called the robust clubhook squid, has a mantle length of up to 200 cm (6.6 ft). Some older records exceed this, such as the 91.5 in (232 cm) ML reported by Verrill (1876:237) from a specimen with a total length of 14 ft (4.3 m) (excluding the ends of the tentacles, which had been destroyed). Nesis (1987:192) likewise gave a maximum mantle length of 230 cm (7.5 ft), but Roper & Jereb (2010i:364) wrote that "this old record might be in error", with the species commonly growing to 160 cm (5.2 ft) ML. Glaubrecht & Salcedo-Vargas (2004:66) provided a maximum total length of 4–6 m (13–20 ft). Literature sources give a maximum weight of 50 kg (110 lb). There exist numerous published records of large individuals of this species.

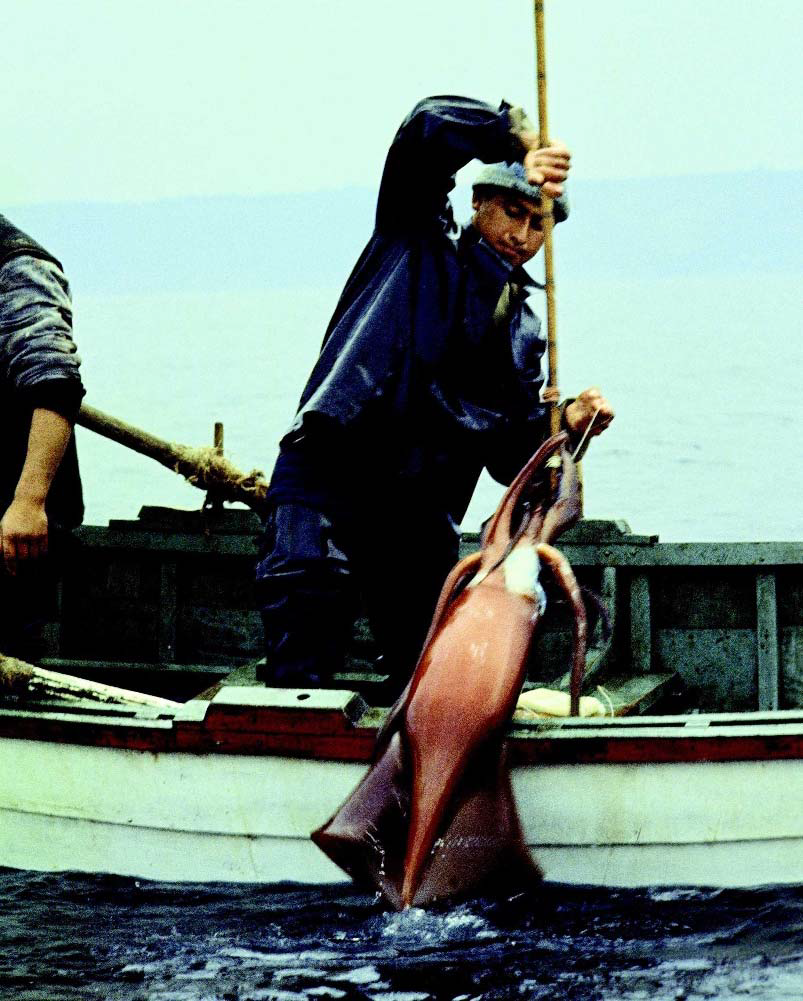
Fisherman taking a Humboldt squid off the coast of Chile. This species is the largest squid species commonly encountered by humans, possessing a large fishery.

The Humboldt squid (Dosidicus gigas), also known as the 'jumbo squid', grows to a maximum mantle length of at least 120 cm (3.9 ft), if not 150 cm (4.9 ft). The largest animals are found off the western coast of South America; northern populations reach 100 cm (3.3 ft) ML, and in general 50–80 cm (1.6–2.6 ft) ML is more typical for the species. Southern populations may have a total length approaching 2.5 m (8.2 ft), and possibly up to 3.7 m (12 ft). Again, specimens from the Northern Hemisphere are much smaller, with those off the Californian coast reaching total lengths of less than 1.7 m (5.6 ft). The Humboldt squid commonly attains a weight of around 20–30 kg (44–66 lb) and can reach a maximum of 50 kg (110 lb). There are anecdotal reports of much larger individual animals, including from diver Scott Cassell, who has dived with Humboldt squid over 300 times (reportedly more than any other person). (Note: In particular, Scott Cassell mentioned a giant Humboldt squid he named 'Scar' (after the scars on its mantle), whose size he described thus: Scar is over seven feet [2.1 m] in length, larger than anyone has ever proven. His body was 3 feet [0.9 m] thick (He's too big to put my arms around him) and I estimated he weight [sic] between 230 and 250 pounds [100–110 kg].)

Moroteuthopsis longimana, previously Kondakovia longimana and sometimes known as the giant warty squid, is a little known species with a circum-Antarctic distribution in the Southern Ocean. The largest complete specimen, found floating at the surface off the South Orkney Islands, had a mantle length of 108 cm (3.54 ft), but a damaged female specimen with an estimated mantle length of around 150 cm (4.9 ft) is known. The largest complete specimen had a wet weight of 29 kg (64 lb). The species' maximum weight has been estimated at 50 kg (110 lb).

==== Largest octopodes ====
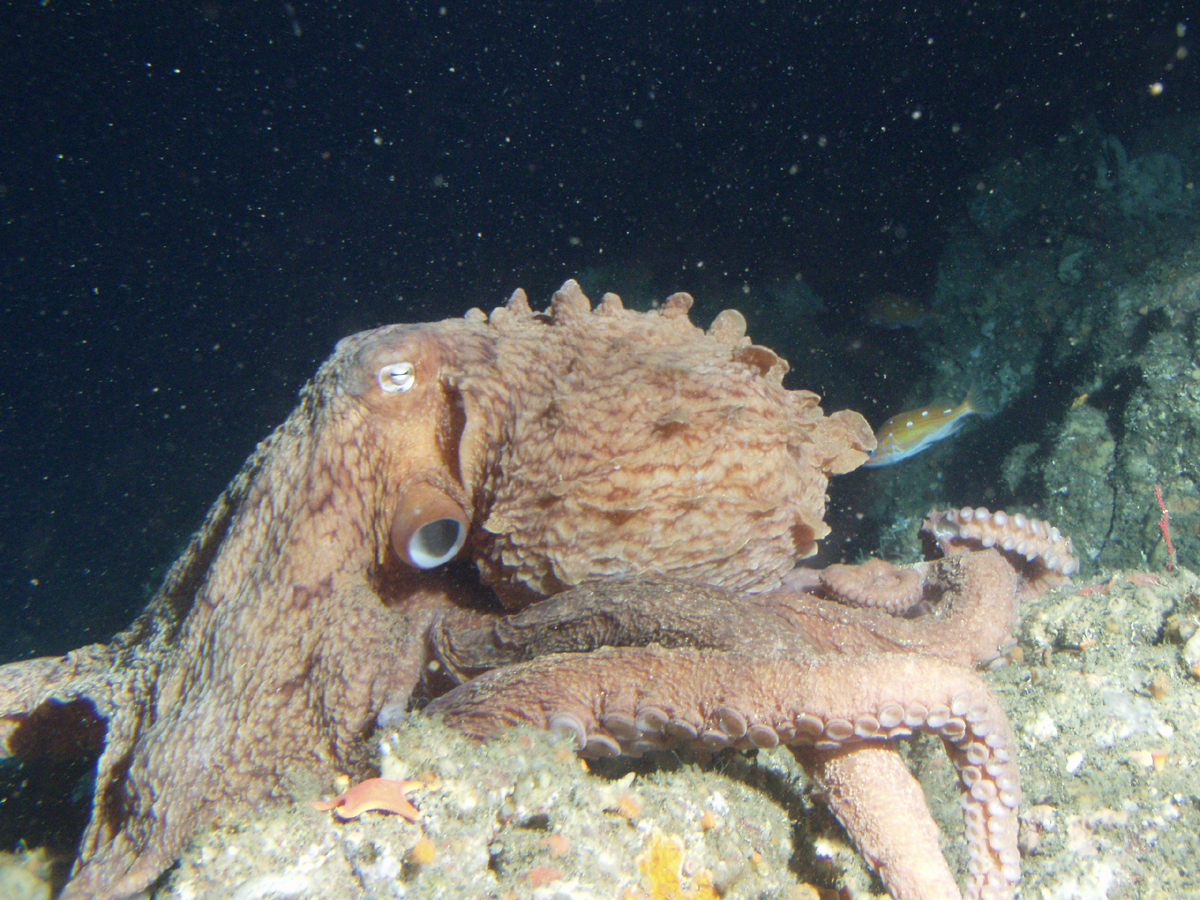
The giant Pacific octopus is one of the two largest octopus species

The giant Pacific octopus (Enteroctopus dofleini) grows to more than 6.1 m (20 ft) in total length and at least 60 cm (2.0 ft) in mantle length. Cosgrove (1987) and Cosgrove & McDaniel (2009:69) gave a maximum confirmed weight of 71 kg (157 lb) for a live specimen collected in the mid-1960s. Norman et al. (2014:124) accept a maximum weight of at least 180 kg (400 lb), which approximates the 182.3 kg (402 lb) reported for a specimen caught off Santa Barbara, California, in 1945, of which photographic evidence survives. The photograph of the 1945 specimen appears to show an average to large octopus, nothing like the claimed size. No specimens approaching this size have been reported since the middle of the 20th century, with recent specimens very rarely exceeding 50 kg (110 lb). It is possible that the maximum size of the species has decreased over this period, perhaps due to bioaccumulation of toxicants (see below).

In 2002, a giant specimen of Haliphron atlanticus, the seven-arm octopus, was caught by fishermen trawling at a depth of 920 m (3,020 ft) off the eastern Chatham Rise, New Zealand. This specimen, the largest of this species and possibly of all octopuses, was the first validated record of Haliphron from the South Pacific. It had a mantle length of 0.69 m (2.3 ft), a total length of 2.90 m (9.5 ft), and a weight of 61.0 kg (134.5 lb), although it was incomplete. The total length of the specimen, when complete, has been estimated at 4 m (13 ft), and its weight at 75 kg (165 lb).

=== Extinct taxa ===
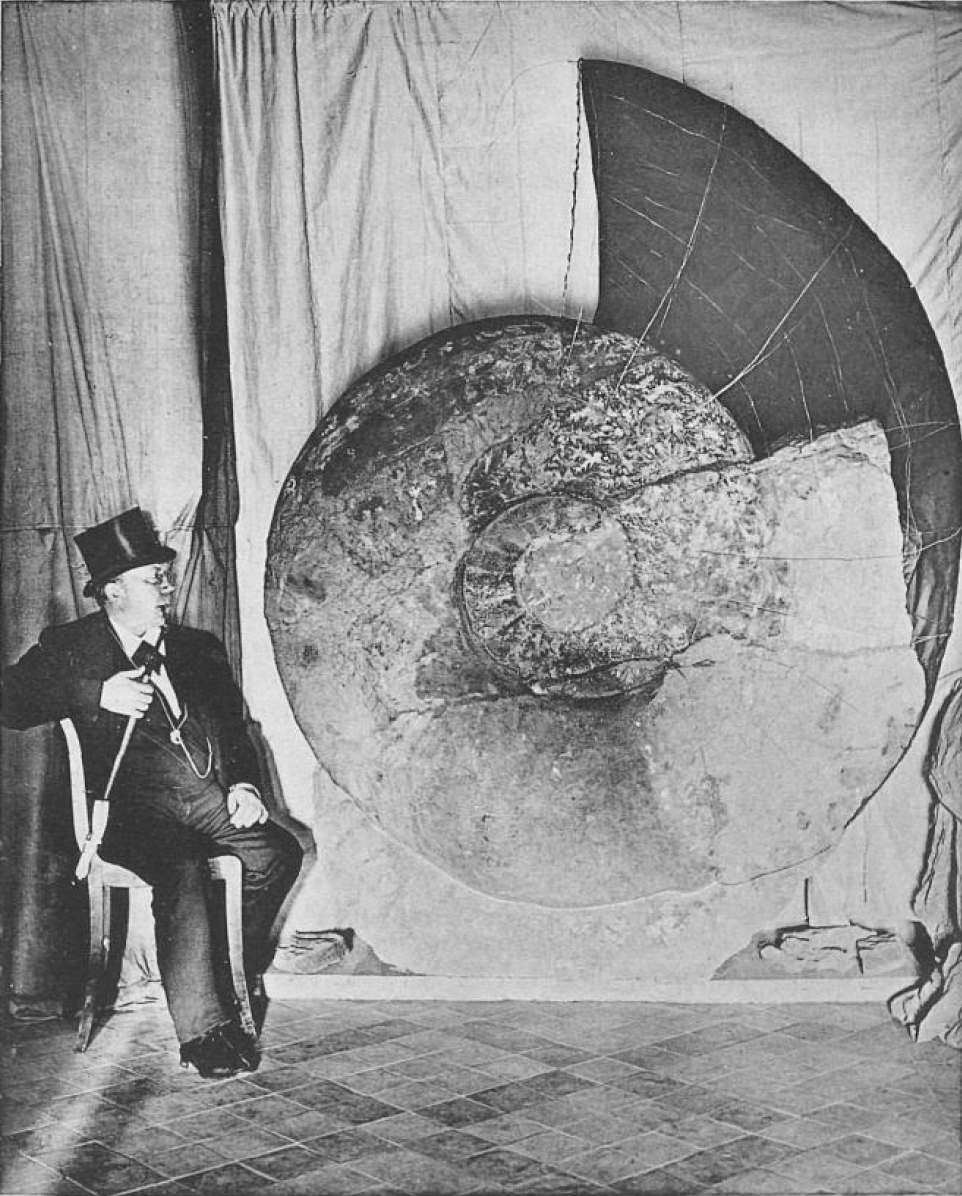
The largest known specimen of Parapuzosia seppenradensis, with its describing author, Hermann Landois, who reconstructed its missing living chamber with a combination of wire frame and paper. Landois assumed that the living chamber constituted one-fourth of the outer whorl, but Teichert & Kummel (1960:6) estimated that it continued for three-fourths to one full whorl, which would give an original shell diameter of around 3.5 m (11 ft).

Certain extinct cephalopods rivalled or even exceeded the size of the largest living species. In particular, the subclass Ammonoidea is known to have included a considerable number of species that may be considered "giant" (defined by Stevens, 1988 as those exceeding 1 m (3.3 ft) in shell diameter). The largest confirmed ammonite, a specimen of Parapuzosia seppenradensis discovered in a German quarry in 1895, measures 1.742 m (5.72 ft) in diameter, though its living chamber is largely missing. The diameter of the complete shell has been estimated at 2.55 m (8.4 ft), assuming the living chamber took up one-fourth of the outer whorl. Teichert & Kummel (1960:6) suggested an even larger original shell diameter of around 3.5 m (11 ft) for this specimen, assuming the body chamber extended for three-fourths to one full whorl. In 1971 a portion of an ammonite possibly surpassing this specimen was reportedly found in a brickyard in Bottrop, western Germany. A specimen found by Jim Rockwood, from the Late Triassic near Williston Lake, British Columbia, was said to measure more than 8 ft (2.4 m) across, but was later determined to be a concretion.

Reconstructions of the holotype (FHSM 13049) and largest specimen (NDGS 241) of Enchoteuthis melanae, based on Muensterella and Dosidicus

Heteromorph ammonites are known to have exceeded 1 m (3.3 ft) in length also, but since their shells were uncoiled to varying degrees, they were overall much smaller than the largest non-heteromorphs. The greatest lengths of all were reached by the orthocones of endocerid nautiloids such as Endoceras, which may have exceeded 8 m (26 ft), although their maximum size is uncertain; while the largest well documented endocerid fossil is likely the 3-metre-long (9.8 ft) shell fragment housed at the Museum of Comparative Zoology, Harvard University, there are published reports of even larger specimens. Teichert (1927) mentioned specimens up to 5 m (16 ft) long from the Middle Ordovician limestone of Estonia and Frey (1995:72) gave a maximum shell length of 6 m (20 ft) for the group. On the subject of endocerid size, nautiloid specialist Rousseau H. Flower wrote:

They are not all large, by any means, but specimens twelve feet [3.7 m] in length have been collected, and fragments of greater diameter indicate a much greater maximum length. I am not wholly inclined to discredit a report of an endoceroid found in a quarry near Watertown New York, which was measured before it was broken up and found to attain a length of 30 feet [9.1 m].

However, the uncoiled length of the largest ammonites far exceeds that of even these giant endocerids. Parapuzosia seppenradensis, the largest known ammonite species, had an estimated maximum unrolled shell length of around 18 m (60 ft). It was also possibly the heaviest of all known cephalopods, past or present, with an estimated live mass of 1,456 kg (3,210 lb), of which the shell would constitute 705 kg. By comparison, the largest endocerids may have weighed around 1,000 kg (2,200 lb). In terms of mass, these are the largest known invertebrates that have ever lived, though perhaps still second to the largest living cephalopods when considering tissue mass alone, since in shell-bearing species the vast majority of the living tissue is restricted to the body chamber, which occupies only a fraction of the internal shell volume. They might also be the largest—or at least longest—shell-bearing animals that have ever lived. (Note: Depending on how one defines 'shell-bearing', other extinct contenders could include the aquatic turtles Archelon and Stupendemys (the former having a skeletal framework rather than a solid shell), the tortoise Megalochelys, and the armoured mammal Glyptodon and its relatives.)

Cretaceous Yezo Group in Japan yields multiple taxa of large-sized cephalopod fossil remains. Oegopsid Yezoteuthis giganteus and Haboroteuthis poseidon are only known from jaw elements, which is close to size of that of giant squid. Species of Nanaimoteuthis, especially N. hikidai would be the largest known vampyromorph. Unnamed, incomplete upper jaw fossil that is approximately twice as large as that of the mature giant squid is also found there. In 2026, Nanaimoteuthis haggarti was estimated to be between 7 and 19 m long, making it possibly the largest animal in the Late Cretaceous oceans and even the largest known invertebrate. Though the upper estimates of its body length have been questioned by some researchers.

=== Historical claims ===
==== Misidentifications ====
Kubota's photograph of a large Onykia robusta, which was misidentified as the giant squid, Architeuthis dux. Wide-angle photography exaggerated the size of the squid such that it appeared impossibly large for the species.

The maximum sizes of certain cephalopod species, most notably the giant squid and giant Pacific octopus, have often been misreported and exaggerated. The literature on cephalopod size has been further muddied by the frequent misattribution of various squid specimens to the giant squid genus Architeuthis, often based solely on their large size. In the academic literature alone, such misidentifications encompass at least the oegopsid families Chiroteuthidae, Cranchiidae, Ommastrephidae, Onychoteuthidae, and Psychroteuthidae. (Note: Iwai (1956:139) reported on two small squid (92 and 104 mm ML) recovered from the "digestive canal" of a sperm whale, which he identified as belonging to the genus Architeuthis. Roper & Young (1972:220) showed that this was certainly a misidentification and attributed them instead to the family Psychroteuthidae. In a brief summary of this case, Ellis (1998a:121) gave an erroneous total length of "8 feet" (2.4 m) for the larger of the two specimens (even though in an almost word-for-word identical footnote in Ellis, 1994a:145 he correctly stated the total length was "8 inches" [20 cm]). This mistake was repeated by Glaubrecht & Salcedo-Vargas (2004:67), giving rise to the claim of an implausibly large psychroteuthid "with about three meter total length".) This situation is further confused by the occasional usage of the common name 'giant squid' in reference to large squids of other genera.

Perhaps the most notable misidentification relates to a photograph taken some time before 1993 by diver H. Kubota off southern Japan. The image shows a large individual of Onykia robusta (previously known as Moroteuthis robusta), which appears to be sick or dying, alongside a diver in shallow water. A video of the same animal appeared in a Japanese made-for-television film. The image was published in the 1993 book European Seashells by Guido T. Poppe and Yoshihiro Goto, where it was identified as Architeuthis dux, the giant squid, and said to have been taken in the North Atlantic. If true, this image would represent the first known photograph of a live giant squid. In The Search for the Giant Squid (1998), Richard Ellis wrote:

For a moment, I thought that some obscure photograph had captured the most elusive image in natural history. Fortunately for those who have devoted their lives to searching for Architeuthis, this was only an aberration, a case of mistaken identity.

It would be more than a decade before the true first photographs of a live giant squid in the wild were taken on 30 September 2004 by Tsunemi Kubodera and Kyoichi Mori. Kubodera and his team subsequently became the first to film a live adult giant squid on 4 December 2006, and the first to film a live giant squid in its natural habitat in July 2012. These milestones were preceded by the first footage of a live (paralarval) giant squid in 2001, and the first image of a live adult giant squid on 15 January 2002. Since then, live giant squid have been photographed and filmed on a number of occasions.

==== Giant squid ====
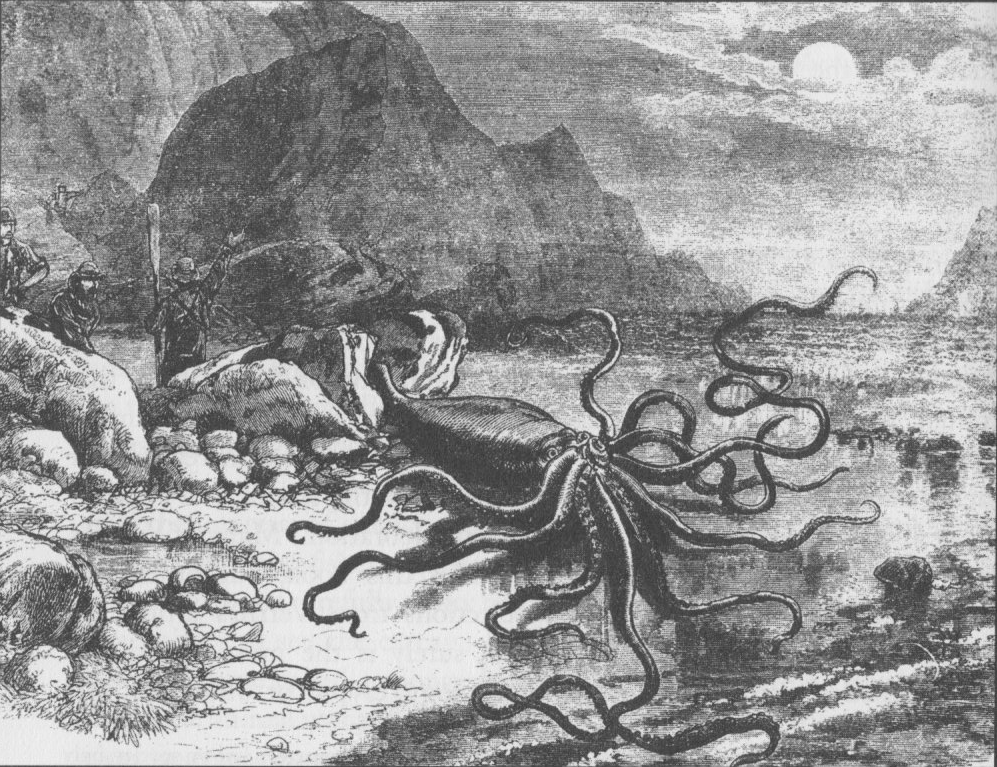
The "nearly perfect specimen" that was beached alive in Trinity Bay, Newfoundland, on 24 September 1877. A number of exceptionally large giant squid were reported from Newfoundland in the 1870s, and these were meticulously documented in a series of papers by zoologist Addison Emery Verrill.

Reports of giant squid (Architeuthis dux) specimens reaching or even exceeding 18 m (59 ft) in total length are widespread, but no animals approaching this size have been scientifically documented in recent times. This is despite there being hundreds of specimens available for study (c. 700 documented as of 2015, of which c. 460 measured in some way), including numerous recent examples, such as the 57 specimens recorded from Japanese waters over a 15-month period in 2014–2015. It is now thought likely that such lengths were achieved by great lengthening of the two long feeding tentacles, analogous to stretching elastic bands, or resulted from inadequate measurement methods such as pacing.

On the subject of the oft-cited maximum size of 18 metres—or 60 feet—Dery (2013) quoted giant squid experts Steve O'Shea and Clyde Roper:

If this figure [45 ft or 14 m] seems a little short of the Brobdingnagian claims made for Architeuthis in most pop-science stories about the animal, that's probably because virtually every general-interest article dutifully repeats the magic number of 60 feet.

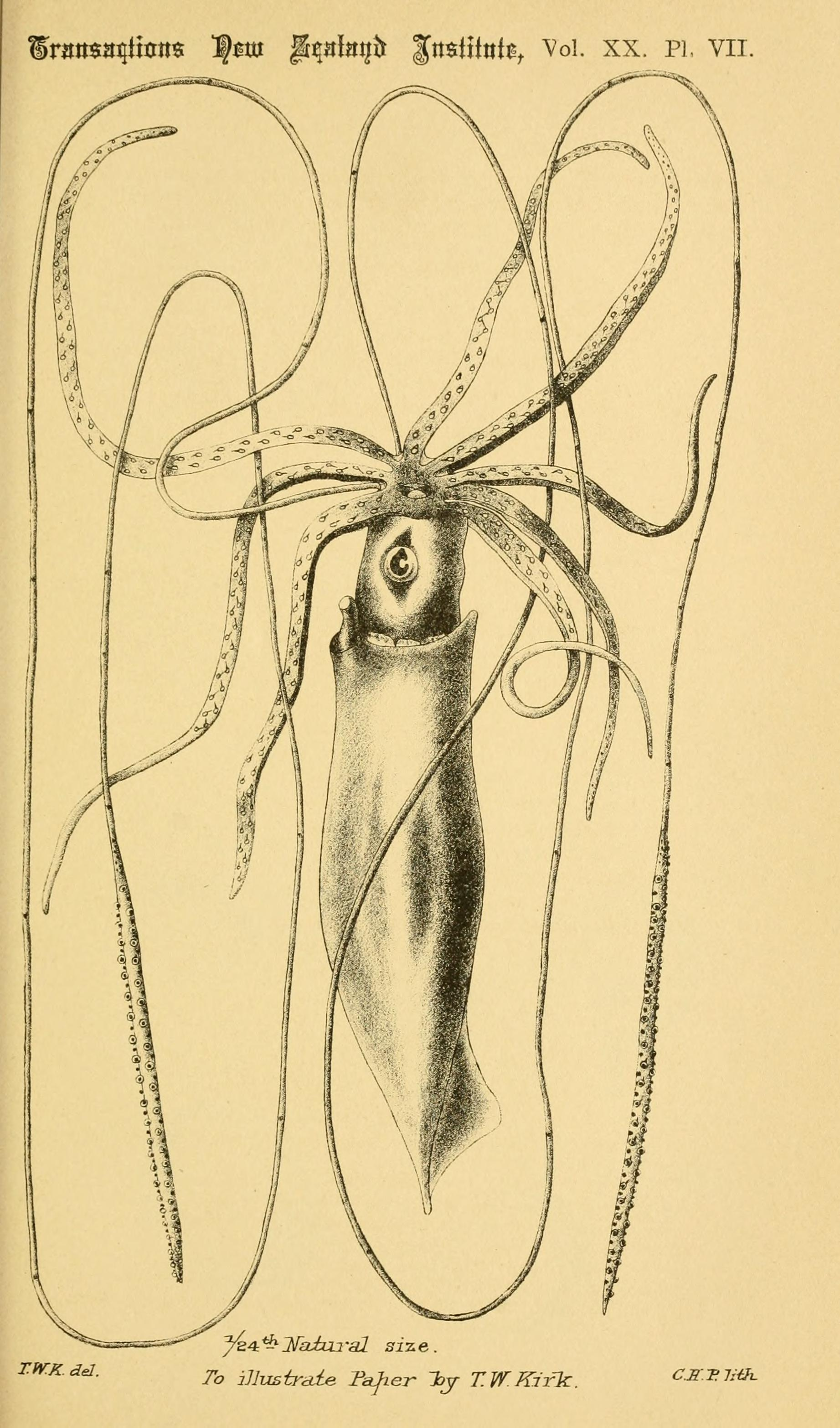
Steve O'Shea deplores the media's perpetuation of what he believes to be a credulity-straining exaggeration, based on the 19th-century biologist Thomas Kirk's eyeball estimate of a specimen's length. (Note: T. W. Kirk's sketch of the Architeuthis longimanus type specimen in lateral aspect, from Kirk (1888). Note the extreme length of the feeding tentacles relative to the mantle and arms. Thomas William Kirk gave the following account of this specimen in his formal description of Architeuthis longimanus: [...] Early last month Mr. Smith, a local fisherman, brought to the [Colonial] Museum the beak and buccal-mass of a cuttle which had that morning been found lying on the "Big Beach" (Lyall Bay), and he assured us that the creature measured sixty-two feet [18.9 m] in total length. I that afternoon proceeded to the spot and made a careful examination, took notes, measurements, and also obtained a sketch, which, although the terribly heavy rain and driving southerly wind rendered it impossible to do justice to the subject, will, I trust, convey to you some idea of the general outline of this most recently-arrived Devil-fish. Measurements showed that, although Mr. Smith was over the mark in giving the total length as 62 feet [18.9 m] (probably, not having a measure with him, he only stepped the distance), those figures were not so very far out; for, although the body was in all ways smaller than any of the hitherto-described New Zealand species, the enormous development of the very slight tentacular arms brought the total length up to 55 feet 2 inches [16.81 m], or more than half as long again as the largest species yet recorded from these seas. The length of the tentacular arms is not a very important character, as they are known to be capable of extension or retraction at the will of the animal, at least to a considerable extent. [...] This specimen was a female, and to this fact may be due some of the points in which it differs from previous occurrences; but yet they are so considerable that I have no doubt a new subgenus at least will have to be created for its reception. In the meantime I place it under Architeuthis, with the full knowledge, however, that it cannot possibly remain there permanently, the shape of the arms and the fins alone being sufficient to put it out of association with that genus. As soon as opportunity offers, I hope to make a further study and fully determine its affinities. Kirk (1888:38) provides a table with a detailed breakdown of the specimen's various measurements. There is, however, a discrepancy between the total length of 684 in (17.37 m, or exactly 57 ft) given in the table—which agrees with the individual values of 71 in (1.80 m) for the mantle, 22 in (0.56 m) for the head, and 591 in (15.01 m) for the tentacles—and the total length of 55 ft 2 in (16.81 m) given by Kirk in the body of the article. Wood (1982:191) suggested that, due to the tentacles' highly retractile nature, the total length of 62 feet (18.9 m) originally reported by the fisherman "may have been correct at the time he found the squid", and that "[t]his probably also explains the discrepancy in Kirk's figures". Owing to its small mantle size, Wood (1982:191) estimated that "this specimen probably weighed less than 300 lb [140 kg]". O'Shea & Bolstad (2008) opined that the reported total length of 55 ft 2 in (16.81 m) "simply cannot be correct" and attributed it to either "imagination" or artificial lengthening of the tentacles. They added that a female giant squid with a mantle length of 71 in (180 cm) "measured post mortem and relaxed (by modern standards) today would have a total length of ≈32 feet [9.8 m]".) In a comment on the final draft of this article, O'Shea wrote, "Kirk paced it, in his own words, for he had no ruler/measure handy, and I believe this misrepresentation has been perpetuated enough; if they were foot-on-foot, as in heel directly to toe, I would accept 57 (or 58, whatever the precise figure was), but I think perpetuating this as fact any longer is doing a disservice to science."

Roper, in his comments on the final draft of this article, was even more conservative, writing, "there are no confirmed records of giant squid longer than about 45 feet [14 m] total length. Most are in the 25–35-foot [7.6–10.7 m] range. I have examined specimens in museums and laboratories around the world—perhaps a 100 or so—and I believe the 60-foot number comes from fear, fantasy, and pulling the highly elastic tentacles out to the near breaking point when they are measured on the shore or on deck."

===== Largest reported animals =====
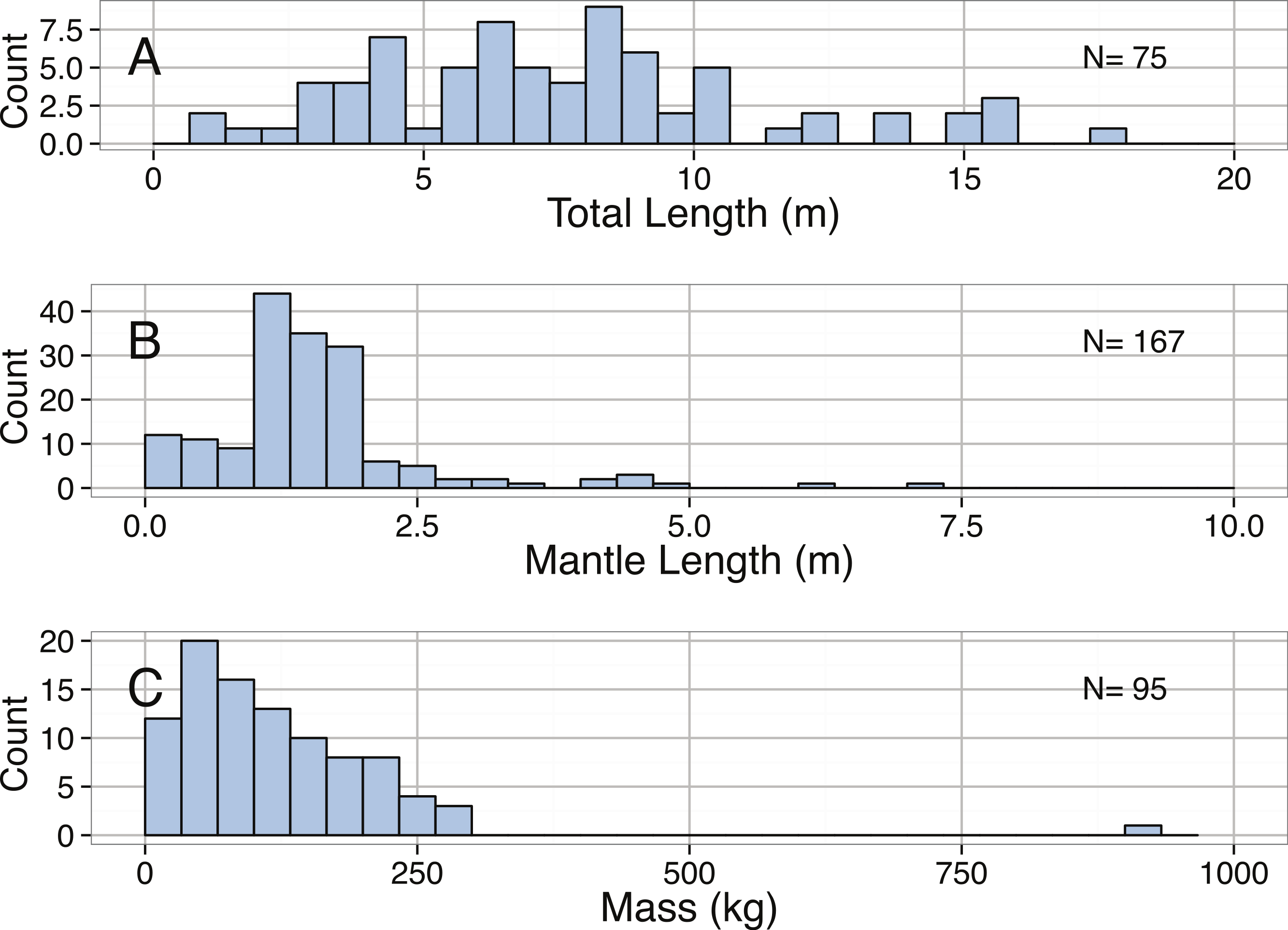
Frequency distribution of total length, mantle length, and mass in Architeuthis dux. The 2,000 lb (910 kg) extreme outlier is sourced from Verrill (1880a) and is unlikely to be accurate; the next most massive individual in the data set was only 700 lb (320 kg), and 95% of specimens were below 250 kg (550 lb).

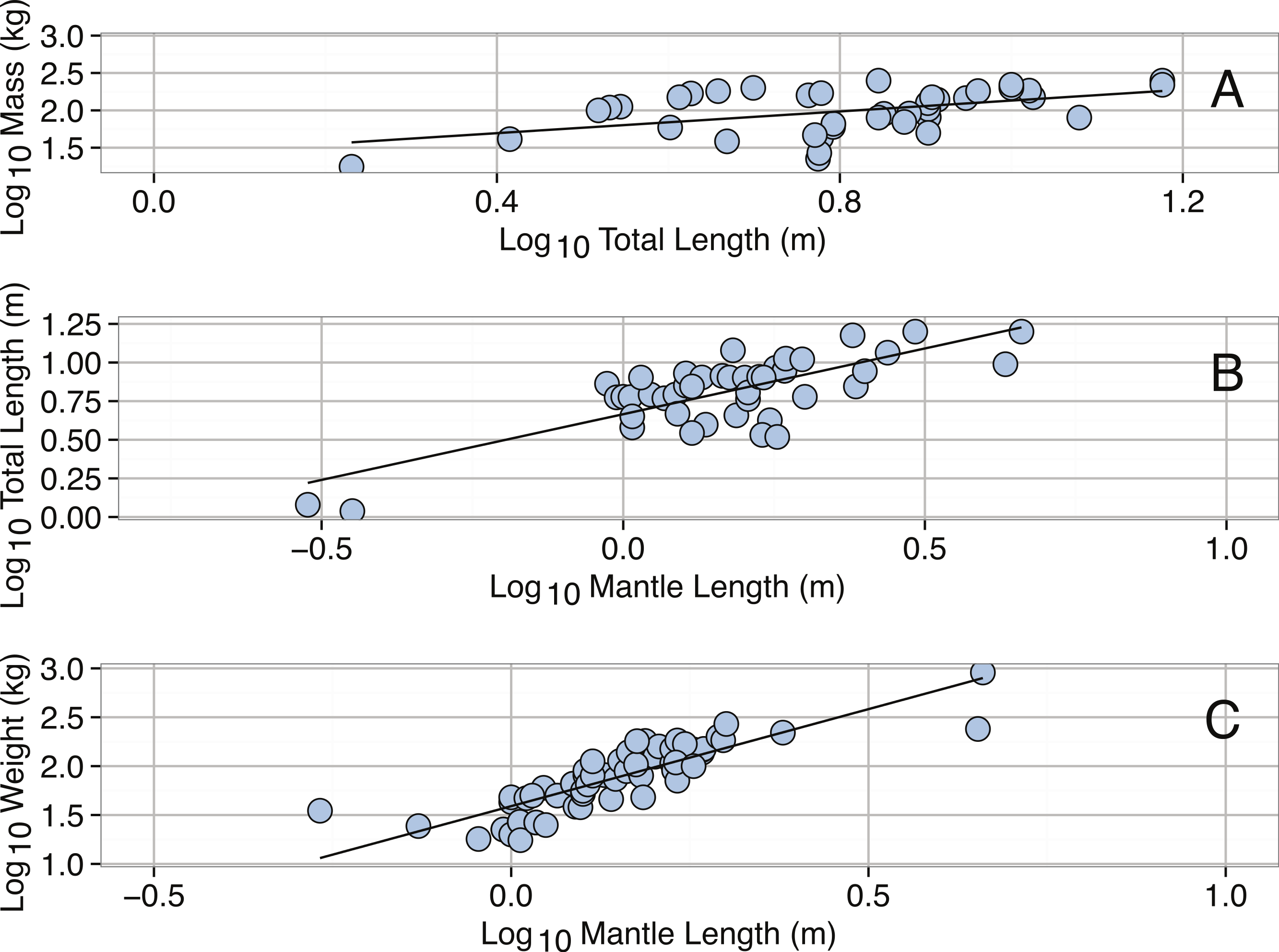
Log–log linear regressions for Architeuthis dux: (A) total length vs. mass; (B) mantle length vs. total length; and (C) mantle length vs. mass

Paxton (2016a) investigated the maximum size of Architeuthis by performing a statistical analysis using data from literature records of giant squid specimens. He selected what he regarded as the largest size records for each of mantle length (ML), standard length (SL), and total length (TL). Paxton's study has been criticised by giant squid experts, who have called into question the reliability of some of the selected literature records.

For mantle length, Paxton (2016a:83) considered the 11 ft (3.35 m) reported by Dell (1952:98) as the "longest measured", though "more reliably" the 9 ft 2 in (2.79 m) ML specimen from Lyall Bay, New Zealand, documented by Kirk (1880:312). (Note: Kirk (1880:312) wrote of this specimen: On 23rd of May last, the Ven. Archdeacon Stock very kindly sent me word that three boys, named Edward R. Stock, and Frank and Walter Morrah, had that morning discovered, at Lyall Bay, what they took to be a very large cuttlefish, with arms several feet long. I lost no time in proceeding to the spot, determined, if possible, to carry home the entire specimen; but judge my surprise when, on reaching the bay, I saw an animal of the size represented in the drawing now before you.* Victor Hugo's account of his "pieuvre" was brought vividly to my mind, and I could not help thinking that a man would stand but a poor chance if he once got within the grasp of such a monster. My first step after spreading out the arms, was to make a rough sketch and very careful measurements. I then proceeded to extract the so-called skeleton, but found that some person or persons, who had visited the spot earlier than myself, had not been able to resist the temptation to try the temper of their knives upon its back, and had in consequence severed the cuttle-bone in various places. However, I was able, not only to procure all the pieces, but also the beak, tongue, and some of the suckers, only a few of which remained, the greater portion of them having been torn off, either in some fierce encounter, or during the rough weather which had prevailed for some days previously. The length of body from tip of tail to anterior margin of the mantle was 9 feet 2 inches [2.79 m] and 7 feet 3 inches [2.21 m] in circumference; the head from anterior margin of mantle to roots of arms 1-foot 11 inches [58 cm], making the total length of the body 11 feet 1 inch [3.38 m]. The head measured 4 feet [1.2 m] in circumference. The sessile arms measured 4 feet 3 inches [1.30 m] in length, and 11 inches [28 cm] in circumference; each of these arms bore thirty-six suckers, arranged in two equal rows (as shown by the scars), and measuring from $\tfrac{13}{16}$ to $\tfrac{1}{4}$ of an inch [20.6–6.4 mm] in diameter; every sucker was strengthened by a bony ring armed with from forty to sixty sharp incurved teeth. The tentacular arms had been torn off at the length of 6 feet 2 inches [1.88 m], which was probably less than half their original length. The fins were posterior, and were mere lateral expansions of the mantle, they did not extend over the back as in the case with Onychoteuthis, etc.; each measured 24 inches [61 cm] in length and 13 inches [33 cm] in width. The cuttle bone, when first extracted, measured 6 feet 3 inches [1.91 m] in length, and 11 inches [28 cm] in width, but has since shrunk considerably; it was broadly lanceolate, with a hollow conical apex 1$\tfrac{1}{8}$ inch [28.6 mm] deep.) Paxton added: "A 4.5 m [15 ft] specimen from Mauritius is often mistakenly cited but consultation of the primary paper (Staub, 1993) reveals an ill-defined length which is clearly not ML." The greatest measured ML of a giant squid recovered from a sperm whale is either the 2.4 m (7.9 ft) reported by Keil (1963:320) (though Paxton writes: "the account is confused and the 2.4 m figure probably refers to the head and ML combined") or the 6 ft 6 in (1.98 m) of a specimen that had been swallowed whole off the Azores, detailed by Clarke (1955:589) and Clarke (1956:257). The "longest visually estimated" ML, according to Paxton, is the c. 100 ft (30 m) of a specimen apparently observed in the North Atlantic off Portugal, attributed to a personal communication with T. Lipington. A more modest 4 m (13 ft) ML is also given, based on a sighting in the Indian Ocean sourced to the TV documentary of Lynch (2013).

For standard length (excluding the tentacles), Paxton (2016a:83) cited the 31 ft (9.45 m) of the "Three Arms specimen" documented by Verrill (1880a:192) as the "longest measured". Among specimens recovered from sperm whales, the longest "definitely measured" SL is the 16 ft 3 in (4.95 m) reported by Clarke (1956:257) and the longest "visually estimated" SL is the c. 9 m (30 ft) attributed to a photograph of a sperm whale with giant squid remains in its jaws, though Paxton conceded that it is "[n]ot clear how much/what portion of body was eaten". For the "longest visually estimated", more extreme supposed SLs of c. 175 ft (53 m) and c. 100 ft (30 m) are cited to Starkey (1963) and Ellis (1998a:246), respectively (the latter an eyewitness account by Dennis Braun). Paxton treated these last two size estimates as SLs as opposed to TLs because "squid do not generally leave their tentacles exposed except when grabbing prey and this appears to be the case for Architeuthis".

For total length, Paxton (2016a:83) considered three records as candidates for the "longest measured": the 19 m (62 ft) specimen of Berzin (1972:199), the 55 ft 2 in (16.81 m) specimen described by Kirk (1888) as Architeuthis longimanus—a strangely proportioned animal that has been much commented on—and the 55 ft (16.76 m) "Thimble Tickle specimen" reported by Verrill (1880a:191), which is often cited as the largest giant squid ever recorded. (Note: The Thimble Tickle specimen, which Addison Emery Verrill referred to as his specimen No. 18, is often cited as the largest recorded giant squid, and has long been treated as such by Guinness. The Thimble Tickle squid was found aground offshore, alive, on 2 November 1878, near Little Bay Copper Mine, Thimble Tickle, Notre Dame Bay, Newfoundland. It was secured to a tree with a grapnel and rope and died as the tide receded. No part of the animal was retained as it was cut up for dog food. The length of the "body [..] from the beak to the extremity of the tail" (i.e. mantle plus head) was said to be 20 ft (6.1 m), with "one of the arms" (presumably a tentacle) measuring 35 ft (10.7 m), for a total length of 55 ft (16.8 m). Reverend Moses Harvey detailed the encounter in a letter to the Boston Traveller dated 30 January 1879, which was reproduced by Verrill (1880a:191–192): On the 2d day of November last, Stephen Sherring, a fisherman residing in Thimble Tickle, not far from the locality where the other devil-fish [Verrill specimen No. 19; see Verrill, 1880a:192], was cast ashore, was out in a boat with two other men; not far from the shore they observed some bulky object, and, supposing it might be part of a wreck, they rowed toward it, and, to their horror, found themselves close to a huge fish, having large glassy eyes, which was making desperate efforts to escape, and churning the water into foam by the motion of its immense arms and tail. It was aground and the tide was ebbing. From the funnel at the back of its head it was ejecting large volumes of water, this being its method of moving backward, the force of the stream, by the reaction of the surrounding medium, driving it in the required direction. At times the water from the siphon was black as ink. Finding the monster partially disabled, the fishermen plucked up courage and ventured near enough to throw the grapnel of their boat, the sharp flukes of which, having barbed points, sunk into the soft body. To the grapnel they had attached a stout rope which they had carried ashore and tied to a tree, so as to prevent the fish from going out with the tide. It was a happy thought, for the devil fish found himself effectually moored to the shore. His struggles were terrific as he flung his ten arms about in dying agony. The fishermen took care to keep a respectful distance from the long tentacles, which ever and anon darted out like great tongues from the central mass. At length it became exhausted, and as the water receded it expired. The fishermen, alas! knowing no better, proceeded to convert it into dog's meat. It was a splendid specimen—the largest yet taken—the body measuring 20 feet [6.1 m] from the beak to the extremity of the tail. It was thus exactly double the size of the New York specimen [Verrill specimen No. 14; see Verrill, 1880a:189], and five feet [1.5 m] longer than the one taken by [fisherman William] Budgell [No. 19]. The circumference of the body is not stated, but one of the arms measured 35 feet [10.7 m]. This must have been a tentacle. Such is the fame of the Thimble Tickle specimen that a Giant Squid Interpretation Centre and a "life-sized", 55-foot (17 m) sculpture have been built near the site of its capture. The sculpture appeared on a Canadian postage stamp issued in 2011.) Of the last one, Paxton wrote: "Sometimes mistakenly cited as 17.37 m (57.0 ft) but the source is clear that it is 55 ft long." The first two records, particularly that of Berzin, are more questionable, as Paxton explained:

The accuracy of the two longest measured TLs of 19 and 16.81 m from a specimen found in the gut of a sperm whale from the Indian Ocean and from the specimen from New Zealand in 1887, respectively, should also be questioned but again are certainly not impossible. The New Zealand specimen (named Architeuthis longimanus Kirk, 1888) clearly has the largest ratio of TL to ML ever known in Architeuthis [...] which led [O'Shea & Bolstad, 2008] to suggest that the length was paced out and/or there was extensive post-mortem stretching. However, a re-reading of the original paper suggests that the specimen, although initially paced out, was actually measured, nevertheless the TL is at the edge of the 99.9% prediction interval range [...] and so it was certainly an unusual specimen. Berzin's (1972) Indian Ocean claim is suspect because of the roundness of the figure, the lack of detailed measurements and because in an associated photo, the mantle (whose length was not given) does not look very large compared to the men in the image. Consequently the measurement, if accurate, would represent another animal with very long tentacles.

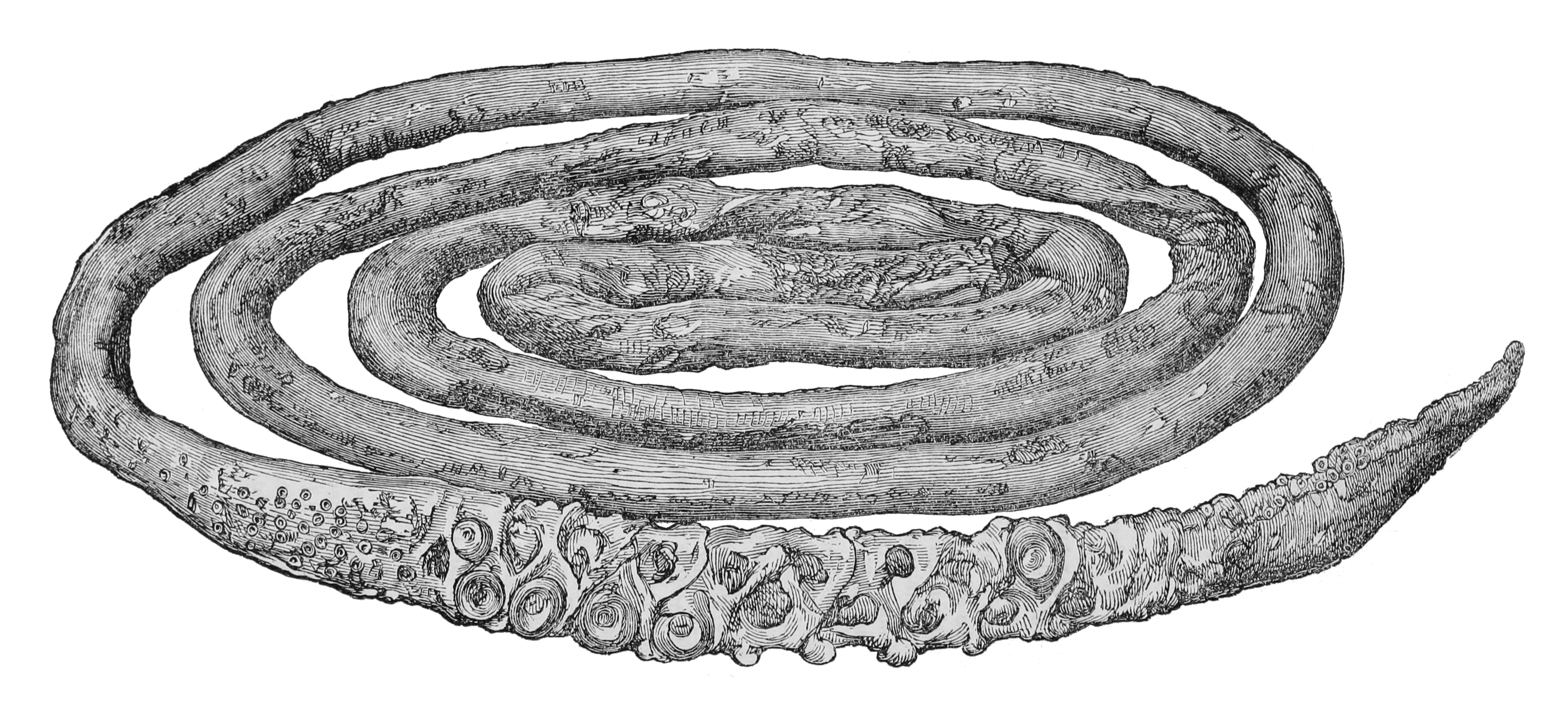
The 19-foot (5.8 m) tentacle that fisherman Theophilus Picot hacked off a live animal on 26 October 1873. Picot estimated the total length of the squid at 60 ft (18 m).

However, as Paxton (2016a:86) pointed out, the genetic analysis of Winkelmann et al. (2013)—which concluded that there is likely a single, globally-distributed species of Architeuthis—did not encompass these two specimens, and it is therefore possible that there exists a second, as yet unsampled, giant squid species with proportionately longer tentacles.

The 19 m (62 ft) total length of the Berzin specimen was later confirmed to be erroneous; according to Valentin Yukhov, who was involved in the specimen's discovery, it should have read 9 m (30 ft). The misprint was reproduced in the English translation published the following year and was later propagated in a number of papers on giant squid. With the Berzin specimen not being as large as originally reported, the longest giant squid recovered from a sperm whale is the 34 ft 5 in (10.49 m) TL individual recorded by Clarke (1956:257) (this specimen also has the longest confirmed ML and SL of any giant squid from a sperm whale). Paxton considered the "longest visually estimated" TL to be the 60 ft (18 m) published by Murray (1874:121), from an eyewitness account by fisherman Theophilus Picot, who claimed to have struck the floating animal from his boat, causing it to attack. Picot managed to hack off one of its tentacles, which was subsequently examined by a number of authors.

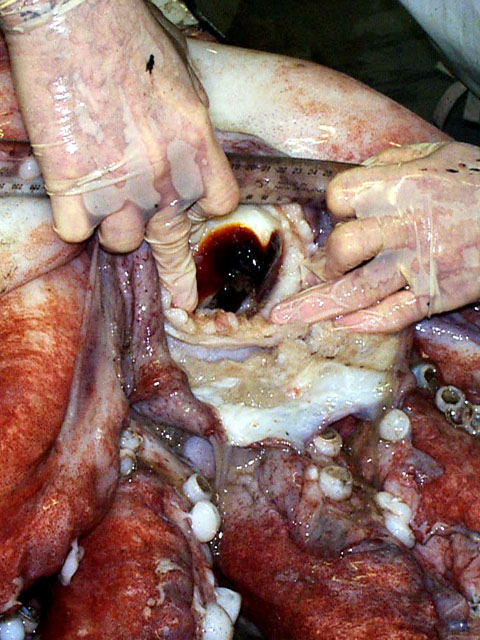
Perhaps the largest of all recorded giant squid specimens was the one found floating at the surface off Saint-Gilles, Réunion, on 4 March 2016. Although due to its great size the specimen could not be retrieved in its entirety, the head and arm crown were saved. Crucially, this meant the beak could be measured to estimate the mantle length and total length of the specimen. Using different allometric scaling equations, (Note: Giant squid beak being measured. Isolated beaks found in the stomachs of predators such as sperm whales can be used to estimate the size of the original animal. Romanov et al. (2017) used the following allometric scaling equations to estimate the dorsal mantle length (DML) from the lower rostral length (LRL) of the beak, and total length (TL) from DML: $LRL = 11.2 \times log_{10} DML - 19.3$ (all values in mm) $DML = e^{(-1.168 + 98.031 \times LRL)}$ (all values in m) $TL = 0.006 + 5.117 DML$ (all values in m) $TL = 1.59 \times DML^{1.98}$ (all values in m)) the lower rostral length of the beak, at 19.74 mm (0.777 in), gave an estimated dorsal mantle length of 215.3–306.0 cm (7.064–10.039 ft) and this, in turn, was used to estimate the total length at 11.025–15.664 m (36.17–51.39 ft).

===== Supposed sucker scars =====
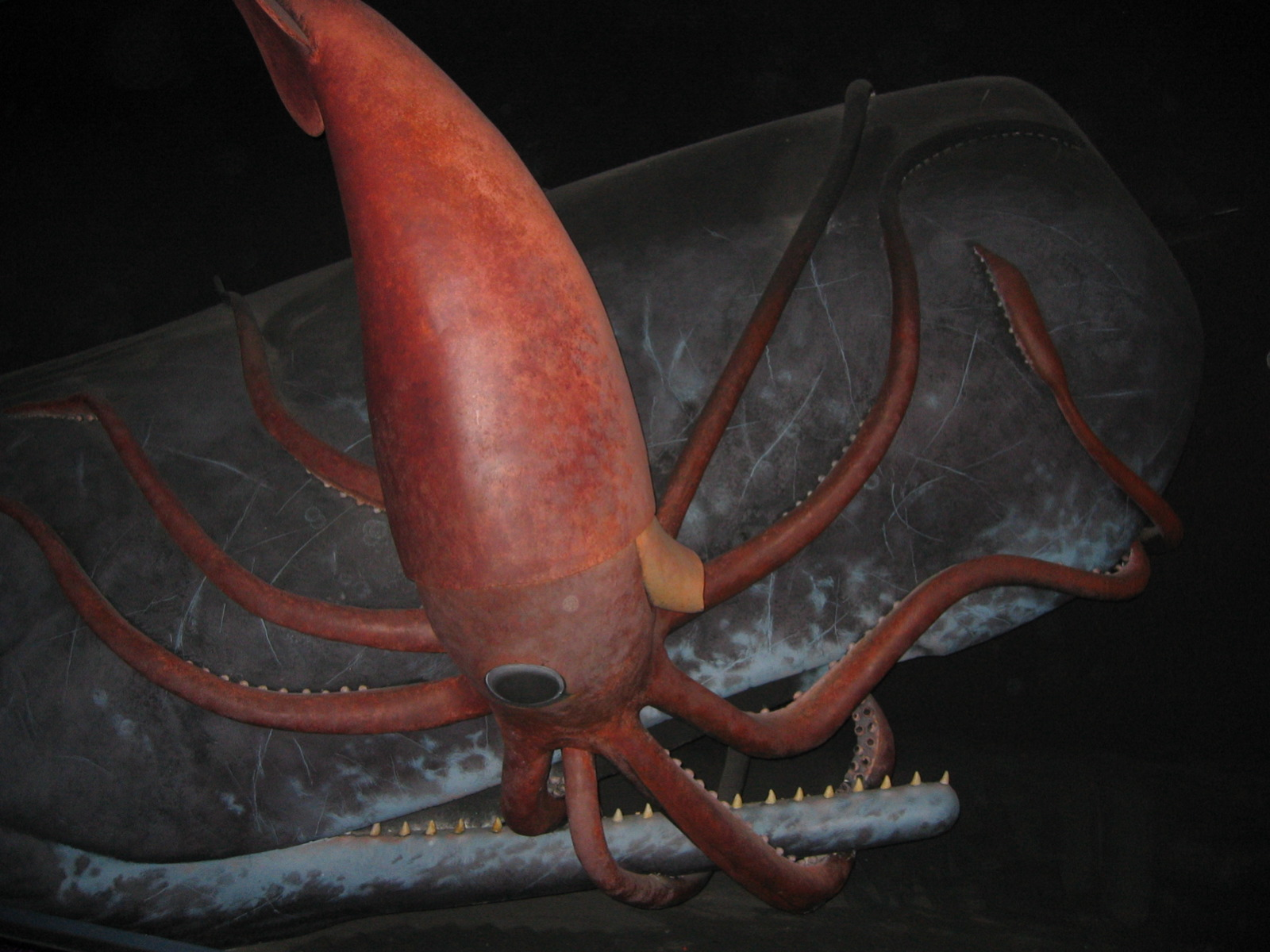
A dramatisation of an underwater encounter between the sperm whale and giant squid, from a diorama at the American Museum of Natural History

More extreme and outlandish giant squid size claims—belonging firmly in the realm of cryptozoology—have appeared in the works of authors such as Bernard Heuvelmans, Willy Ley, and Ivan T. Sanderson. The existence of these gargantuan squids is often supported by reference to the giant circular scars sometimes found on sperm whales, which are assumed to have been inflicted by the suckers of struggling giant squid. Sometimes these claims are accompanied by extrapolations of body size based on the isometric upscaling of a "typical" giant squid. However, such scars are not necessarily of squid origin and may instead represent fungal growths or bite marks, with sea lampreys (Petromyzon marinus) being one possible source. Even in the case of genuine giant squid sucker marks it is possible that subsequent skin growth has enlarged them well beyond their original dimensions.

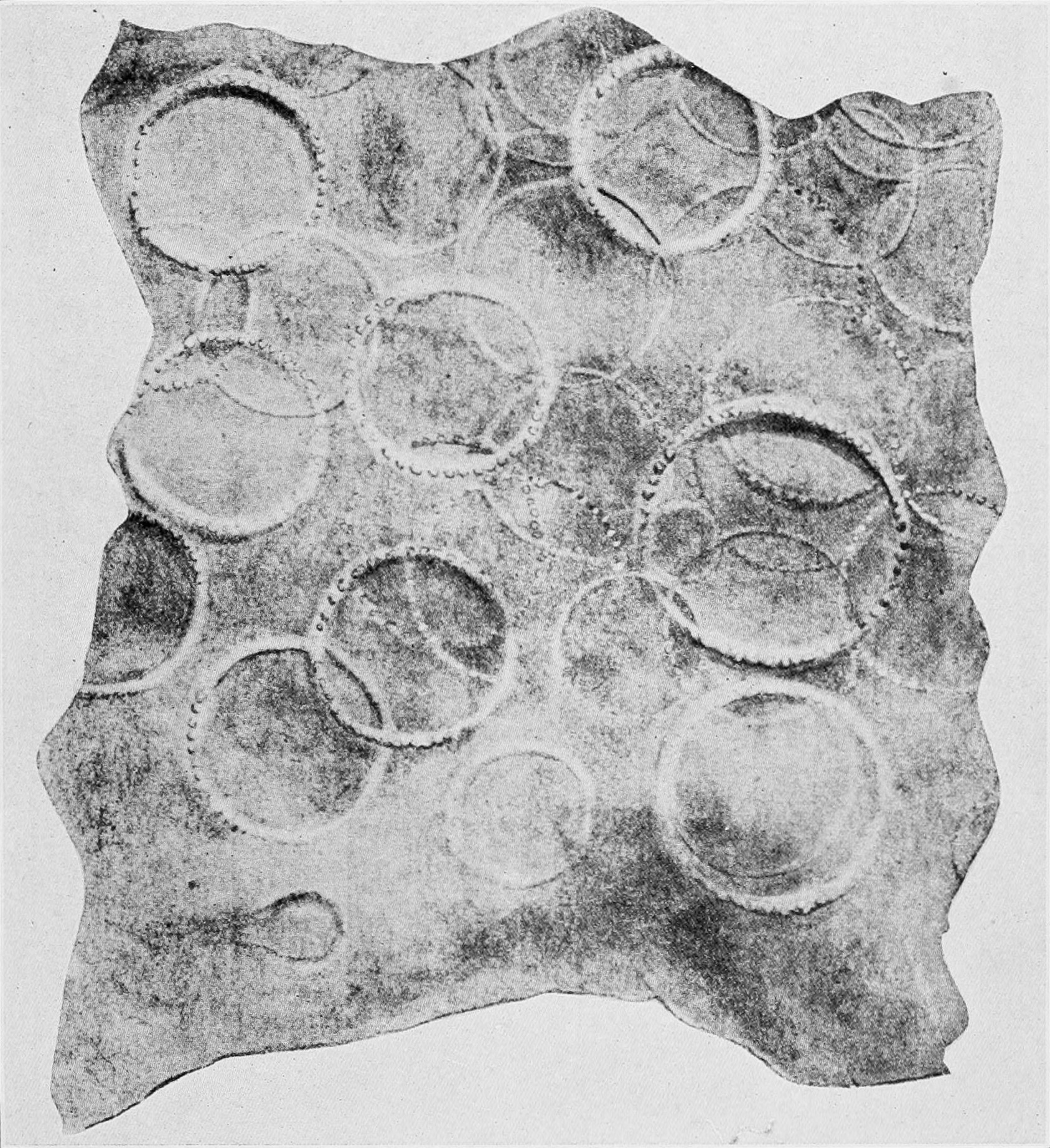
A portion of sperm whale skin with giant squid sucker scars. In this widely reproduced image the largest sucker scars measure around an inch (2.5 cm) across.

Nevertheless, claims of enormous sucker scars are widespread in the literature. Richard Ellis collected some of "the more egregious examples" in his book, The Search for the Giant Squid. These include the claim of Dozier (1976) that "an ordinary giant squid of 50 feet [15 m] leaves teeth-ringed sucker marks measuring between three and four inches [7.6–10.2 cm] across on a whale, but sperm whales have been captured with tentacle marks 18 inches [46 cm] across." L. Harrison Matthews's monographic treatment of the sperm whale, published in 1938, includes the following: "Nearly all male Sperm whales carry scars caused by the suckers and claws of large squids, scars caused by suckers up to 10 cm. [3.9 in] in diameter being common. The claw marks take the form of scratches 2–3 m. [6.6–9.8 ft] in length, and appear to be of more frequent occurrence than sucker marks". Ellis (1998a:142) wrote that this 10 cm figure is "so much larger than any other recorded sucker dimensions that one suspects some sort of error, either in measuring or in transcription."

The subject was covered in some detail by Wood (1982:192):

Measurements of 90 ft [27 m], 130 ft [40 m] and even 200 ft [61 m] have been conjectured for giant squids from the size of sucker marks found on the skins of captured sperm whales, but it is dangerous to place too much reliance on this evidence. Verrill says the largest suckers on the tentacles of a 32 ft [9.8 m] long specimen measured 1 1/4 in [3.2 cm] in diameter, and those on a 52-footer [16 m] about 2 in [5.1 cm]. Daniel (1925), however, examined sucker marks on the head of one cachalot which measured 3 1/2 in [8.9 cm] across, and others measuring up to 5 in [13 cm] in diameter have been found on the skins of sperm whales captured in the North Atlantic. Ivan Sanderson (1956) goes even further and claims that sucker marks over 18 in [46 cm] have been found on the heads of cachalots, but he does not explain how the poor whales managed to escape from the clutches of such colossi!

The general consensus of opinion is that exceptionally large sucker marks, i.e. over 2 in [5.1 cm] in diameter, are old scars that have increased in size as the sperm whale grew.

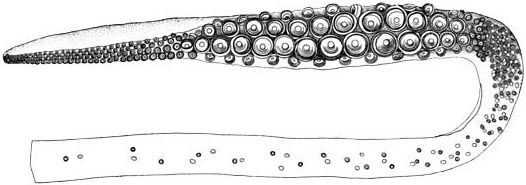
One of the paired tentacular clubs of Architeuthis, showing the enlarged suckers of the manus, which are the largest found on any of the giant squid's limbs

Perhaps the most extreme published claim, ridiculed by Ellis (1998a:142), appeared in Willy Ley's 1959 book, Exotic Zoology: "Toothed whales, vomiting in death struggle, have shown evidence of still larger kraken; in one case a 6-foot [1.8 m] piece of tentacle, with a diameter of 2 feet [0.6 m; emphasis in original], has been claimed. Another claim goes for marks on the skin of such a whale, looking like the mark of a sucking disk over 2 feet [0.6 m] in diameter".

Marine biologist Frederick Aldrich, who personally examined more than a dozen giant squid specimens, wrote that his largest specimen from Newfoundland bore tentacular suckers "approximately two inches [5.1 cm] in diameter" but that "[s]uckers and their toothed armament of over twelve inches [30 cm] in diameter have been found in the stomachs of sperm whale as indigestible wastes". This led him to entertain the idea of giant squid over 150 ft (46 m) long, (Note: Aldrich restated this belief in "Monsters of the Deep", the second episode of the 1980 television series Arthur C. Clarke's Mysterious World: "I believe the giant squid reach an approximate maximum size of something like one hundred and fifty feet [46 m]". Richard Ellis, apparently unaware of Aldrich's similar statements in print, commented: "It is difficult to imagine why Aldrich would have made such an irresponsible statement, unless it had to do with being on camera". Arthur C. Clarke himself once remarked: "it would be strange indeed if the world's biggest squid had been among the very few cast ashore to be examined and measured by naturalists. There may well be specimens more than a hundred feet [30 m] in length.") and even to suggest a binomial name for this super-sized species, were it ever to be discovered: Architeuthis halpertius.

By comparison, giant squid suckers normally reach a maximum diameter of only a few centimetres. Based on a detailed examination of a number of large specimens from New Zealand waters, Förch (1998:55) wrote that "[t]he largest suckers [...] on the sessile arms are a very constant 21–24 millimetres [0.83–0.94 in] in external diameter". In giant squid the largest suckers of all are found on the central portion of the tentacular club, called the manus, and among the specimens examined by Förch (1998:53) these reached a maximum diameter of 28–32 mm (1.10–1.26 in). Clarke (1980) wrote: "I have not yet seen conclusive evidence to suggest that sucker scars are larger than 3.7 centimetres [1.46 in] across". According to Roper & Boss (1982:97), the largest suckers of the tentacular clubs reach 5.2 cm (2.0 in) in diameter.

===== Mass estimates =====
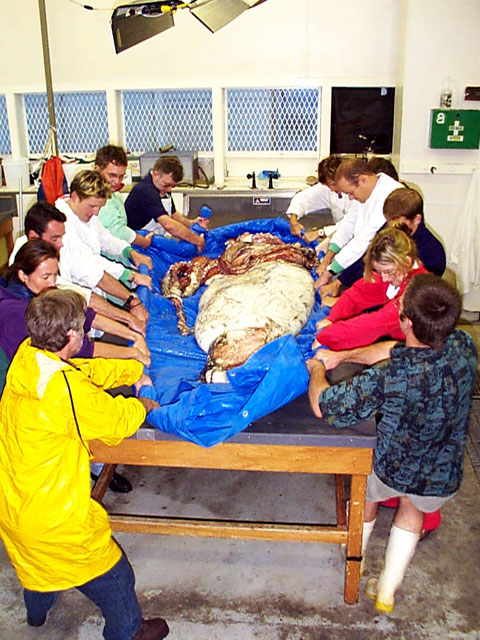
A dozen people attempting to move a giant squid weighing in excess of 200 kg (440 lb)

It is now accepted that the giant squid has a maximum mass of several hundred kilograms, but the literature is rife with claims of much greater weights. Clarke (1966), for example, put the mass of the largest giant squid specimens at around 1 tonne (2,200 lb). Similarly, Richard Ellis wrote: "Where [giant] squid carcasses have actually been weighed, it appears that the longest ones—in the 50-foot [15 m] range, for example—weigh about a ton [910 kg]." Much greater estimates of giant squid mass can be found in, for example, Natural History of Marine Animals by MacGinitie & MacGinitie (1949): "two arms of Architeuthis that were 42 feet [13 m] long were found, and if one reconstructed a body [...] the squid to which these arms belonged was 4.6 feet [1.4 m] in diameter and 24 feet [7.3 m] long, with an overall measurement of 66 feet [20 m]. It would have weighed about 42 1/2 tons [38.6 tonnes]." They added that a 55-foot (17 m) specimen, such as the one reported from Thimble Tickle, "would have weighed 29 1/4 or 30 tons [26.5 or 27.2 tonnes] including the tentacles—a truly noble animal, being a little more than one-fifth the weight of the largest whale and larger than the whale sharks and basking sharks, the largest of all fishes". Ellis characterised these estimates as "unfounded exaggerations". In the revised edition of Natural History of Marine Animals, published in 1968, the authors reduced their estimate to less than 8 tonnes.

Bernard Heuvelmans believed that "there must be Architeuthis weighing more than 5 tons, and some even larger ones which must weigh between 2 and 27 tons, the normal weight being around 8 tons. There are good reasons to believe that there may even exist specimens twice as long as that of Thimble Tickle, which, depending upon their girth, might have weighed between 16 and 216 tons, but more likely around 64 tons." Ellis, who considered these estimates "utterly ridiculous", wrote:

Heuvelmans commits a fundamental error in calculating the weight of some of these monsters when he writes that "the density of living creatures is only slightly higher than that of water ... a decimetre of living flesh weighs about as much as a litre of water." That may be true for some other living creatures, but the flesh of Architeuthis, saturated with ammonium chloride, is lighter than water, and the giant squid is neutrally buoyant. (This is believed to be the reason that dead or dying squid are found floating at the surface or washed up on the beach.) His assumption, therefore, that the 55-foot-long [17 m] Thimble Tickle squid would have "probably weighed near 24 tons" is patently erroneous.

On the subject of the Thimble Tickle specimen's mass, Wood (1982:190) referred to the work of Soviet zoologist and writer Igor Akimushkin:

According to Dr Igor Akimushkin (1965), the Russian teuthologist, a 12 m [39 ft] long giant squid will weigh 1 tonne [2,200 lb] if the head, mantle and arms combined make up half the total length. Since there is a cubic relationship between the linear dimensions of Architeuthis and its volume or weight, this means the Thimble Tickle monster must have scaled about 2.8 tonnes [6,200 lb] (i.e. the weight of a large bull hippopotamus), although 2 tonnes [4,400 lb] is probably a more realistic figure.

==== Giant Pacific octopus ====
The maximum size of the giant Pacific octopus (Enteroctopus dofleini) has long been a source of debate in the scientific community, with dubious reports of specimens weighing hundreds of kilograms.

===== Largest reported animals =====
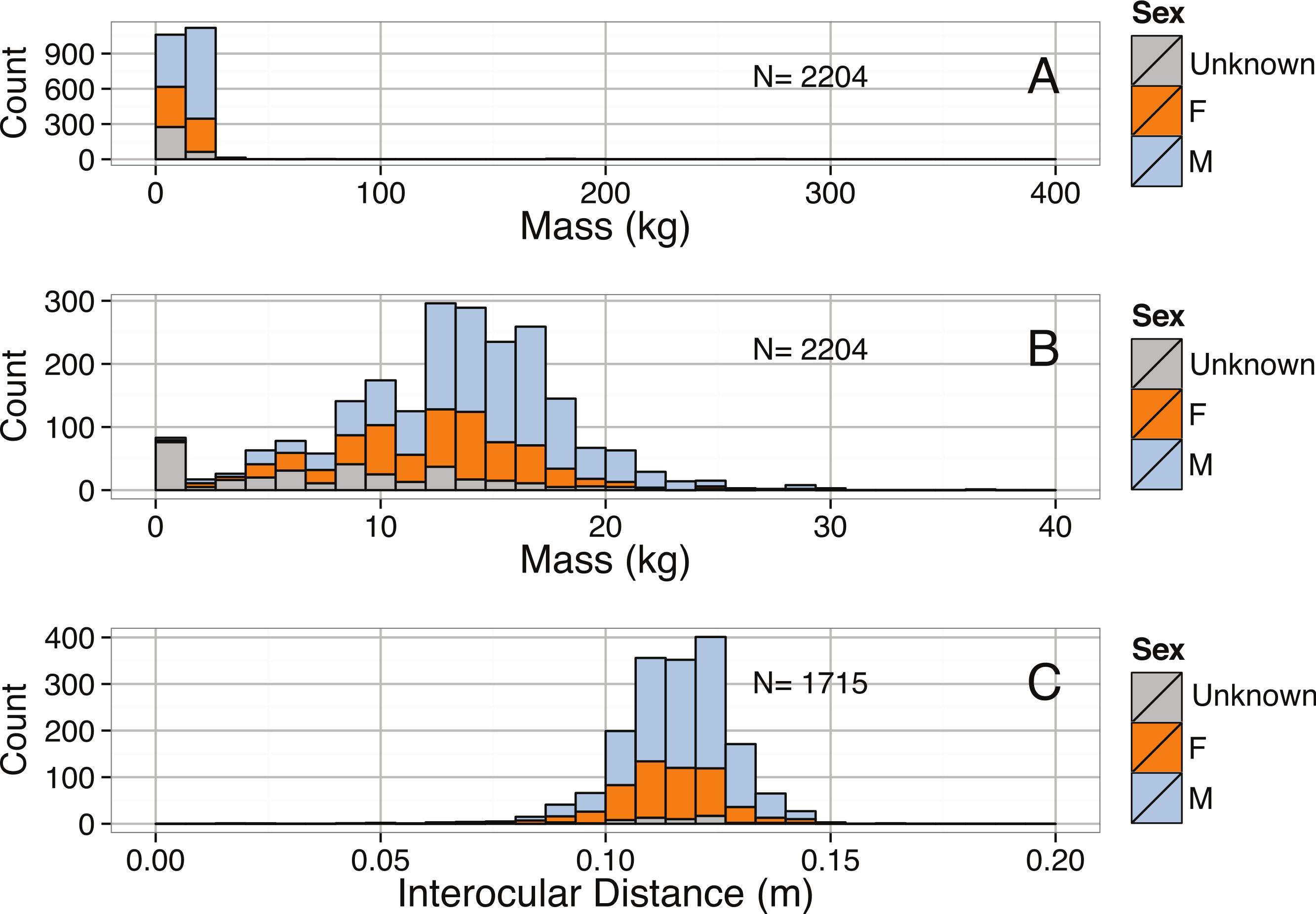
Frequency distribution of mass and interocular distance in male and female Enteroctopus dofleini

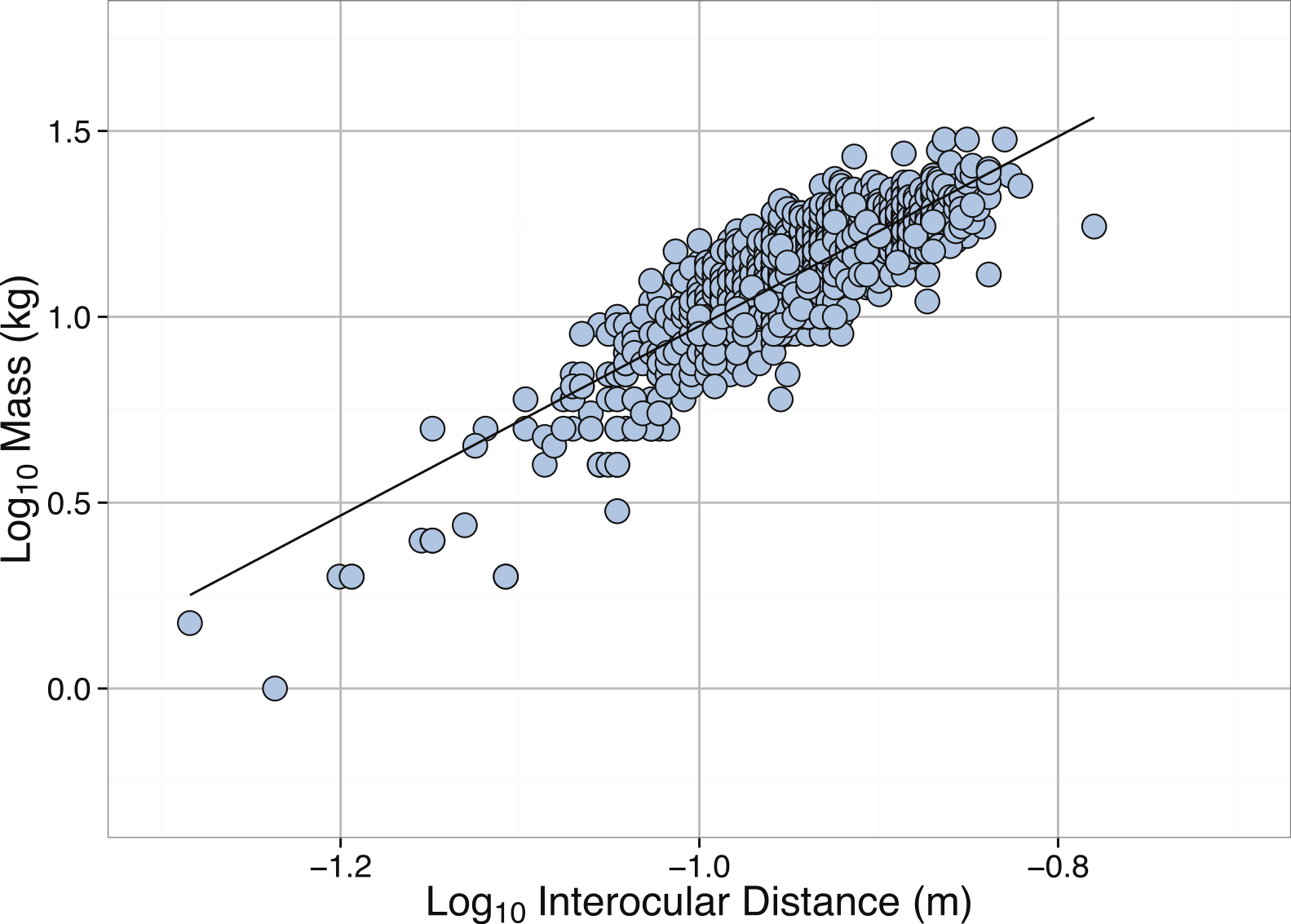
Log–log plot showing relationship between interocular distance and mass in Enteroctopus dofleini

In 1885, reporting on the longest octopus specimen reliably recorded up to that point, renowned malacologist William Healey Dall wrote:

In 1874 I speared an octopus in the harbor of Iliuliuk, Unalashka, which was afterward hung, by a cord tied around the body immediately behind the arms, to one of the stern davits of the coast survey vessel under my command. As soon as the animal died and the muscles relaxed, I noticed that the tips of the longer tentacles just touched the water. On measuring the distance with a cord, I found it to be sixteen feet [4.9 m], giving the creature a spread from tip to tip of the longest pair of arms, of not less than thirty-two feet [9.8 m]. The arms toward the tips were all exceedingly slender, but rather stout toward the body, which was somewhat over a foot [30 cm] long. The largest suckers were two and a half inches [6.4 cm] in diameter; the whole creature nearly filled a large washtub. Parts of this specimen are now in the U. S. national museum.

In an article for the National Marine Fisheries Service summarising knowledge on the giant Pacific octopus, High (1976:17–18) wrote:

Several octopuses in excess of 100 pounds [45 kg] have been encountered and captured. Much larger ones have been reported but, like the Loch Ness Monster, these usually elude the careful photographer or scientist. Most octopuses weigh less than 70 pounds [32 kg] with a stretched length of 15 feet [4.6 m] or less. Overall length between arms is not a suitable measure because of the animal's unusual elasticity.

In the late 1950s, I interviewed a Canadian commercial diver, Jock MacLean of Prince Rupert, B.C. He reported capturing an immense creature weighing 600 pounds [272 kg] and measuring 32 feet [9.8 m] from arm tip to top. MacLean's photographs, unfortunately, were of poor quality. Smaller animals, to 400 pounds [181 kg], were occasionally taken in his commercial octopus fishing endeavor.

Hochberg & Fields (1980:436) referenced the same specimen, writing: "the largest specimen on record with a total arm spread of 9.6 m [31 ft] and a weight of 272 kg [600 lb]". These figures are only estimates, however, as—contrary to the above quotation from High (1976:17–18)—it appears that this specimen was never collected and measured. Murray Newman, director of the Vancouver Aquarium for 37 years, quoted Jock MacLean in his 1994 memoir, Life in a Fishbowl: "Next year [1957] in the same place, I saw one, maybe thirty-two feet [9.8 m] across and six hundred pounds [272 kg]. Didn't go for her, though, no place to keep her!" Nevertheless, the misleadingly precise metric conversion of 272 kg (for 600 lb) and the imprecise conversion of 9.6 m (for 32 ft; naively employing a conversion factor of 0.3 instead of 0.3048) gained wide acceptance as the maximum recorded dimensions of the giant Pacific octopus, and have been much repeated. (Note: An example from the May 2000 issue of Diver magazine reads: "The generally accepted record was of awesome proportions, weighing 272kg and with an arm span of 9.6m.")

Jock MacLean is also reported to have captured a 198 kg (437 lb) animal with an arm span of 8.5 m (28 ft) near Port Hardy, British Columbia, in March 1956. Another giant specimen was caught off Santa Barbara, California, in 1945. Its weight was recorded as 182.3 kg (402 lb) and the surviving photograph makes it possible to estimate its total length at more than 3 m (9.8 ft) and arm span at 6–6.7 m (20–22 ft). In a book dedicated to the giant Pacific octopus, Cosgrove & McDaniel (2009:72) summarised knowledge on the species's maximum size as follows:

The specimen William Dall speared in 1885 [sic] at Iliuliuk had the largest radial span of any giant Pacific octopus ever measured. Jock MacLean's 1956 Port Hardy behemoth was the biggest ever weighed. The Santa Barbara specimen photographed in 1945 was the second heaviest. It would appear that octopuses weighing as much as 272 kg (600 lb) and with radial spans of over nine metres (30 feet) are within the realm of possibility, but have never actually been documented by both measuring and weighing.

===== Possible diminution in size =====
No specimens approaching these extreme sizes have been reported since the middle of the 20th century. This lack of giant individuals is corroborated by commercial octopus fishers; none of those interviewed by Cosgrove & McDaniel (2009) had caught a single animal weighing more than 57 kg (126 lb) in the previous 20 years, among many thousands harvested over that period. Octopus specialist Roland Anderson, a biologist with the Seattle Aquarium for more than 30 years, had long sought, unsuccessfully, to find a giant Pacific octopus weighing more than 100 lb (45 kg). In an attempt to raise a truly enormous specimen, Anderson fed a number of captive males ad libitum. The heaviest animal (nicknamed 'Big') attained a peak weight of 43 kg (95 lb) and its largest suckers measured 7.9 cm (3.1 in) in diameter. Anderson suggested the species might now be maturing at a smaller size as a result of toxicant bioaccumulation, which could explain the lack of truly gigantic specimens in recent times. In particular, high concentrations of heavy metals and PCBs have been identified in the digestive glands of wild giant Pacific octopuses, likely originating from their preferred prey, the red rock crab (Cancer productus). A preliminary study found that aquarium animals fed equal quantities of raw sea food and live C. productus (caught locally in Elliott Bay) matured at a smaller size, reached a lower maximum weight (27 kg [60 lb] mean), and had higher concentrations of most heavy metals, than those fed solely on raw sea food (36 kg [79 lb] mean, including the aforementioned 43 kg [95 lb] specimen).

=== Largest species by measure ===
Cephalopod size can be quantified in various ways. Some of the most common size measures are covered below. The following four tables list only extant species; extinct taxa are treated separately at the end.

==== Mantle length ====
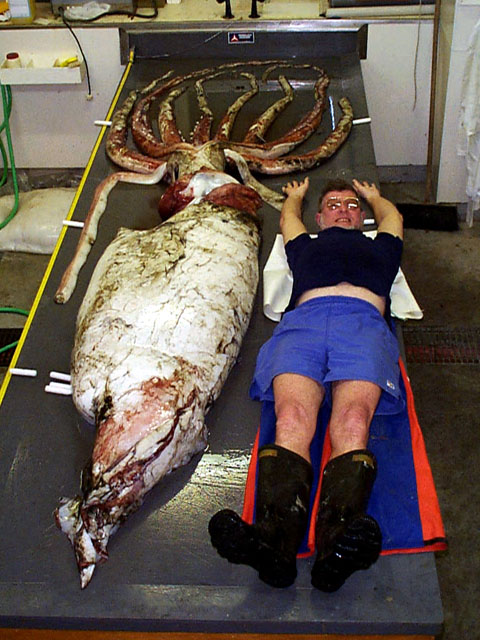
Teuthologist Clyde Roper lying alongside a large giant squid (Architeuthis dux) specimen of almost 2 m (6.6 ft) ML

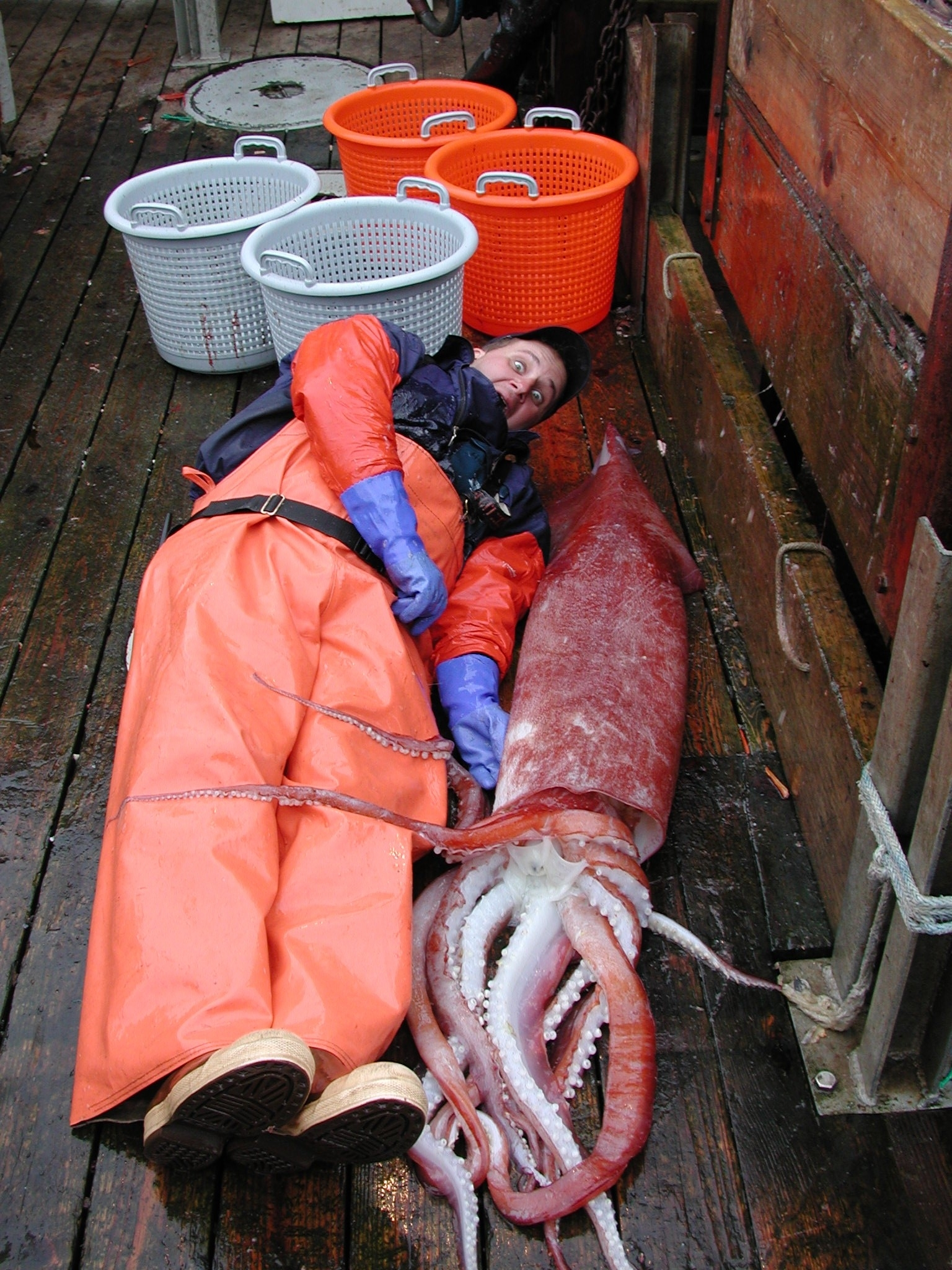
Reaching a mantle length of 2 m (6.6 ft), Onykia robusta is one of the largest squid species (the specimen shown here is considerably smaller).

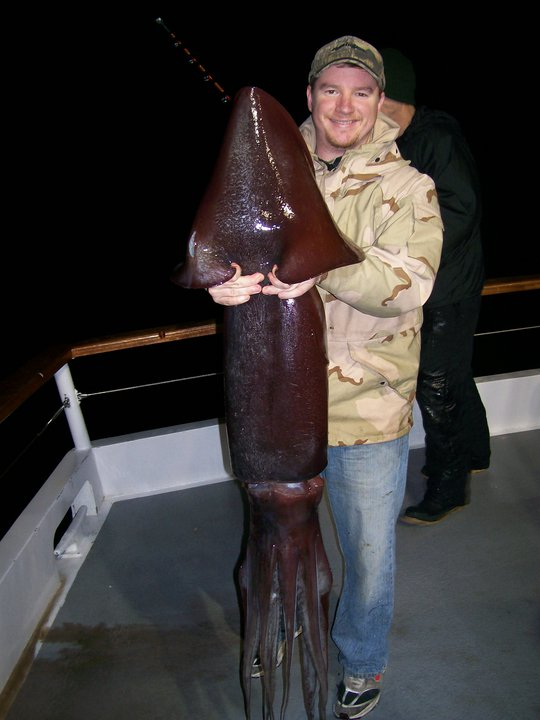
A 52 lb (24 kg) Humboldt squid (Dosidicus gigas) caught off the southern Californian coast displaying deep red chromatophoric colouring.

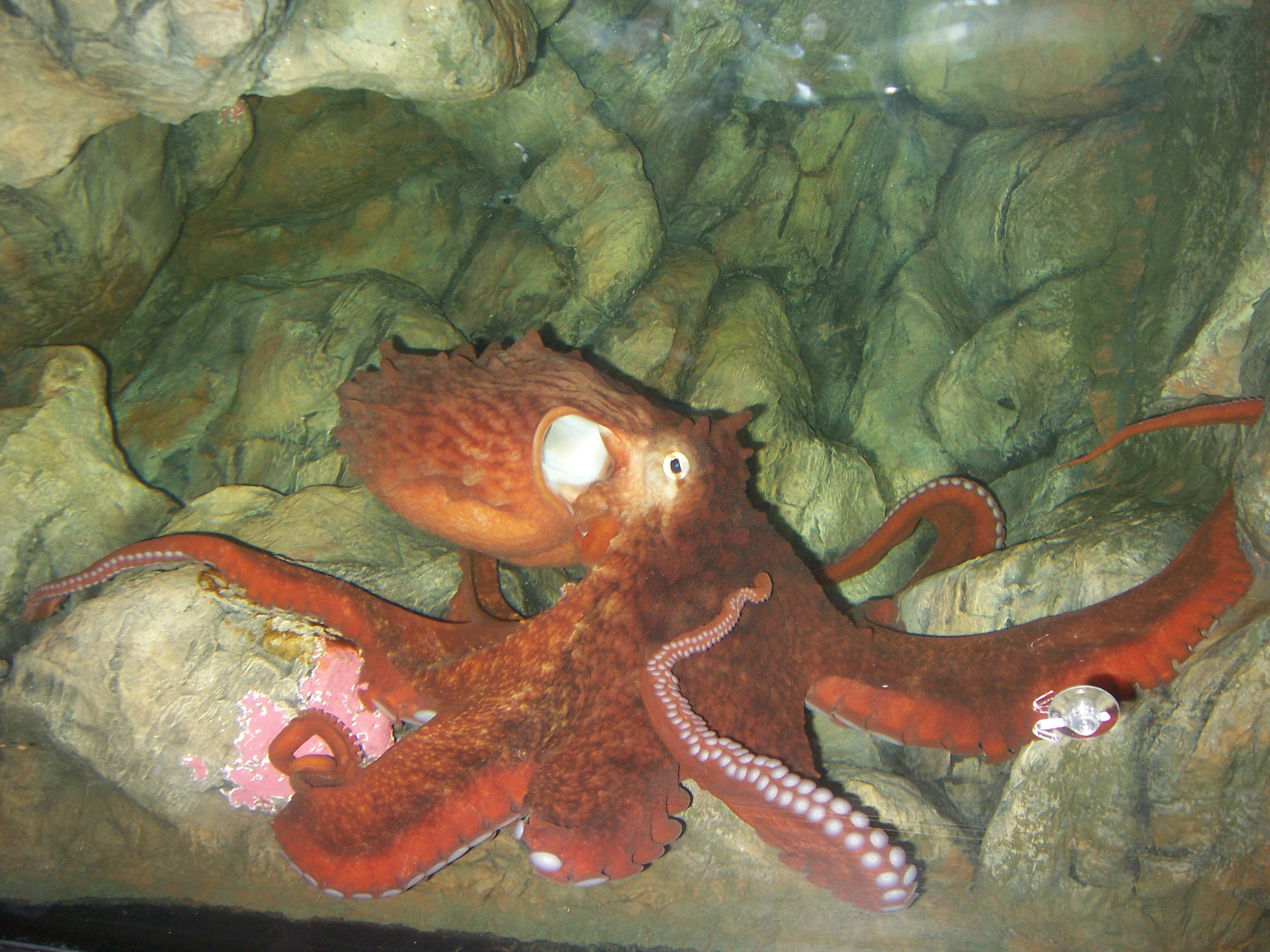
Enteroctopus dofleini at the National Aquarium in Washington, D.C.

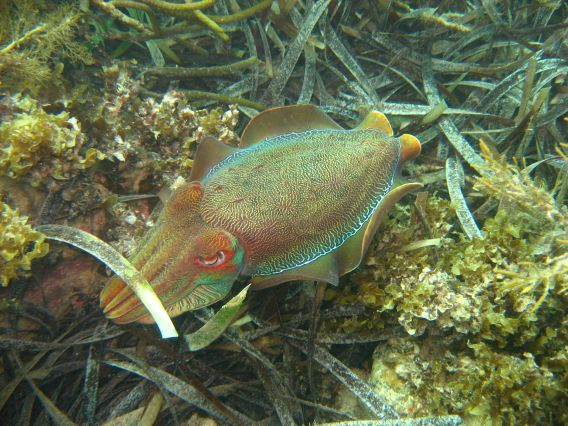
Sepia apama, the largest species of cuttlefish, is native to the southern coast of Australia.

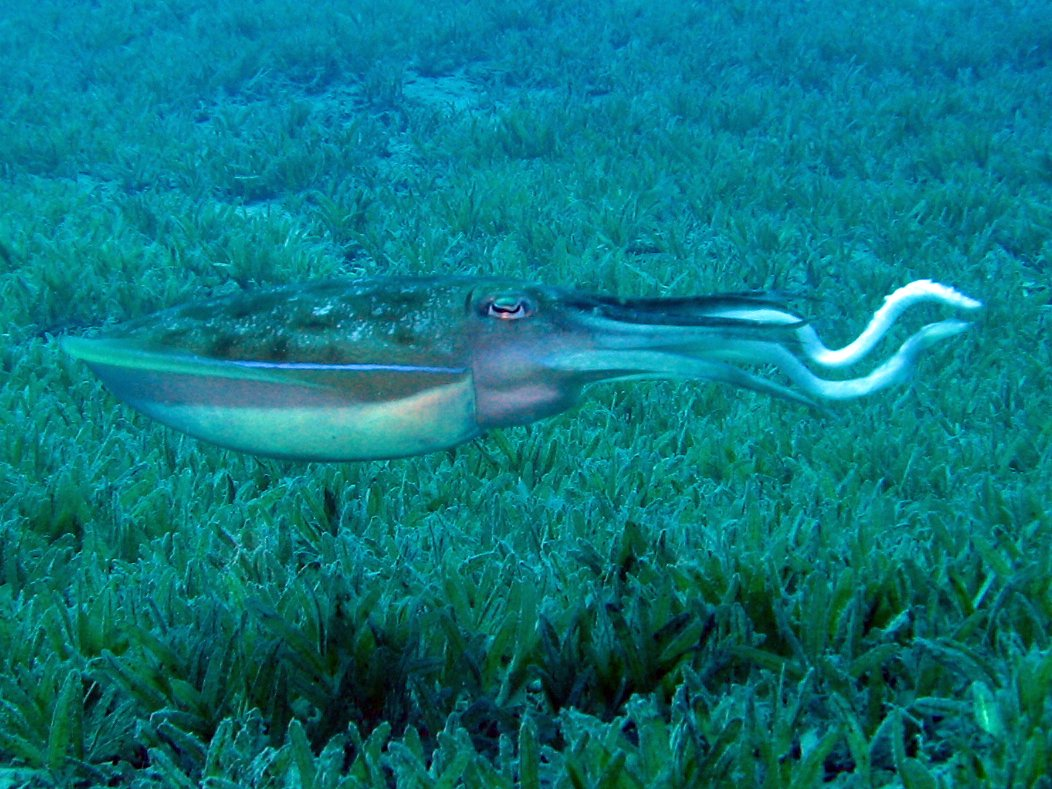
Sepia pharaonis, a large and commercially important cuttlefish species from the Indian Ocean

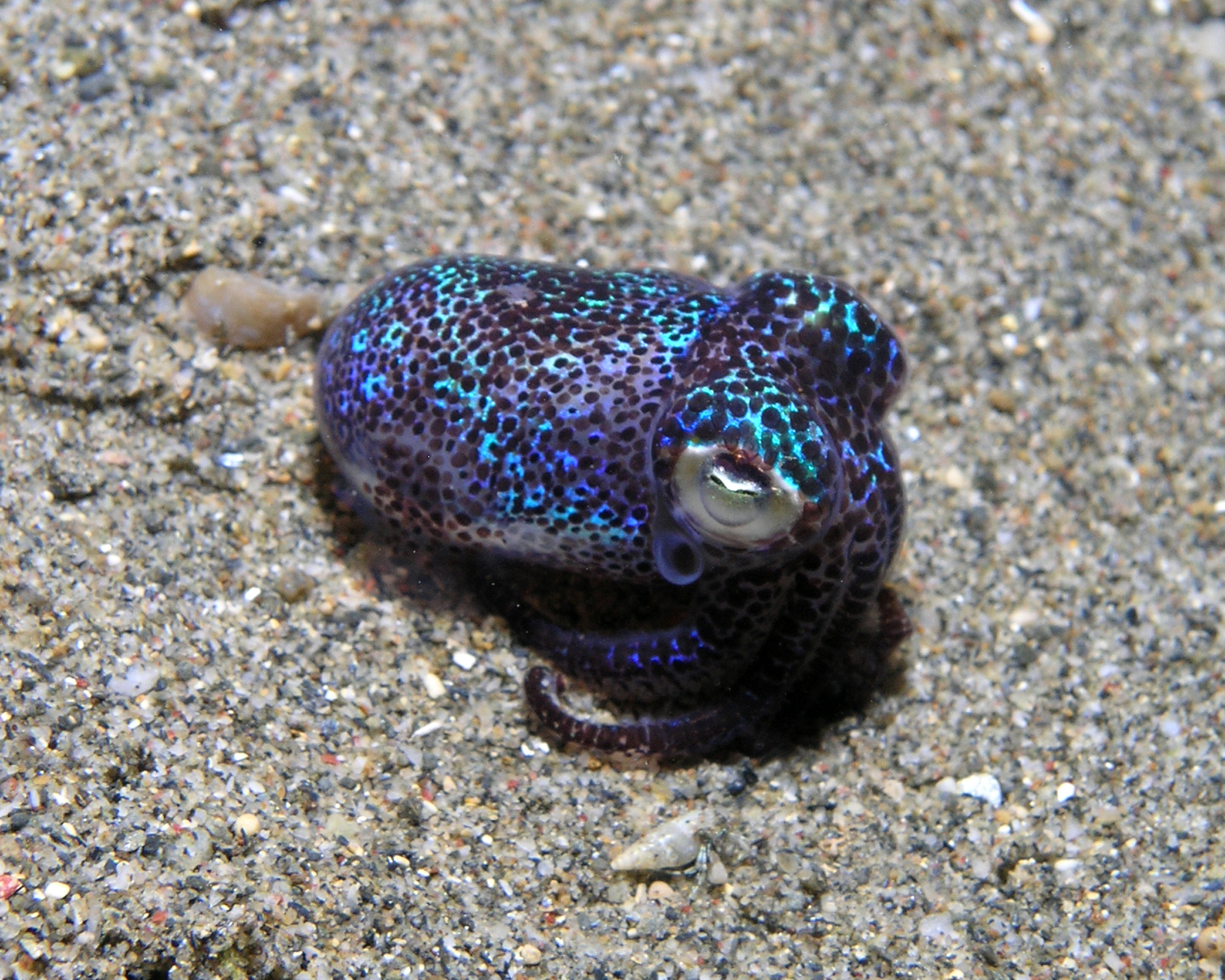
Bobtail squids, such as this Euprymna berryi from East Timor, are some of the smallest of all cephalopods and are not known to attain a mantle length in excess of 10 cm (3.9 in).

The list of largest cephalopods by mantle length is dominated by squids, with more than twenty species exceeding the largest-bodied octopuses and cuttlefish. The largest of all is the colossal squid (Mesonychoteuthis hamiltoni) with an estimated maximum mantle length of 3 m (9.8 ft) (Roper & Jereb, 2010c:173). Even greater mantle lengths have historically been reported for the giant squid (Architeuthis dux), but these have been discredited (see O'Shea & Bolstad, 2008).

Oegopsida (oegopsid squids)
Species	Maximum mantle length	References	Notes
Mesonychoteuthis hamiltoni (colossal squid)	≈300 cm (estimate)	Roper & Jereb (2010c:173)	The largest complete specimen, a mature female recovered from the Ross Sea in February 2007, had a mantle length of around 2.5 m ([Anonymous], N.d.)—this being the maximum scientifically documented mantle length (Rosa et al., 2017)—and several other specimens near this size have been recorded. However, at 42.5 mm LRL, its beak is considerably smaller than the largest recovered from a sperm whale stomach (49 mm LRL; O'Shea & Bolstad, 2008; [Anonymous], N.d.). Maximum mantle lengths as great as 4 m have been estimated and reported in the past (Young, 2003; O'Shea & Bolstad, 2008). There are published claims of a very large section of gladius that would suggest a colossal squid measuring 5 m or more in mantle length (Wood, 1982:191; Bright, 1989:146). (Note: Wood (1982:191) provided the following details: "Dr Anna M Bidder (pers. comm.) of the Department of Zoology at Cambridge University, possesses a transverse slice of the pen of another Mesonychoteuthis which, judging by its width, must have come from a cranchid [sic] measuring at least 5 m [16 ft] in mantle length." The same information is summarised by Bright (1989:146).)
Galiteuthis phyllura	? 265–275 cm (estimate)	Nesis (1985); Nesis (1987:274); Ellis (1998a:149); Glaubrecht & Salcedo-Vargas (2004:65); Hoving & Robison (2017:47)	Estimate based on 40 cm long arm and 115 cm tentacle from the Sea of Okhotsk. (Note: Drawing of Galiteuthis phyllura from the Bulletin of the United States Fish Commission (1881), showing the proportionately short length of the arms and tentacles Ellis (1998a:148–149) wrote of this specimen: The Russian vessel Novoulianovsk, working in the Sea of Okhotsk in 1984, brought up the remains of a gigantic specimen of Galiteuthis phyllura from a depth of one thousand to thirteen hundred meters (thirty-three hundred to forty-three hundred feet), and Nesis (1985) said that it was "almost as large as Mesonychoteuthis hamiltoni (of the same family)." Only an arm and a tentacle were collected, but they were so large (the arm was 40 cm long [15.6 inches] and the tentacle 115 cm [45.5 in]) that Nesis was able to estimate the mantle length at 265 to 275 cm (8.69 to 9.02 ft), and the total length at over 4 meters (more than 13 feet). "Because of its narrow body," wrote Nesis, "we conclude that its mass is consistently lower than that of the other large squids." Roper & Jereb (2010c:165) questioned the validity of this record, writing: "this is considered a doubtful record that might refer to total length; probably the maximum mantle length is less than 400 to 500 mm". But Steve O'Shea commented: The late, great Kir Nesis was not one to exaggerate, and must have had very good reason to cite a possible mantle length of 2.7m [8.9 ft] for Galiteuthis phyllura. Not only would such a monstrous mantle render this the 'largest species of Galiteuthis', but it would give the species a mantle that was considerably longer than that of Architeuthis, and marginally longer (0.2m [0.66 ft]) than the submature Colossal Squid (Mesonychoteuthis) we reported last year [in 2003]. What amazes me is that the adult has never made the press (that I am aware of). Even if Galiteuthis lacks hooks on the arms it would still be a most frightening squid to bump into in the abyss. (O'Shea, 2004b)) Roper & Jereb (2010c:165) write: "this is considered a doubtful record that might refer to total length; probably the maximum mantle length is less than 400 to 500 mm".
Architeuthis dux (giant squid)	240 cm (female)	Landman et al. (2004:686); O'Shea (2006); Roper & Shea (2013:114)	Dorsal mantle length of female captured off Tasmania, Australia, reported by Landman et al. (2004:686) and cited by Roper & Shea (2013:114). Questionable records of up to 500 cm ML can be found in older literature (Roper & Jereb, 2010a:121). O'Shea & Bolstad (2008) give a maximum mantle length of 225 cm based on the examination of more than 130 specimens, as well as beaks recovered from sperm whales (which do not exceed the size of those found in the largest complete specimens). Paxton (2016a) accepts a maximum recorded ML of 279 cm, based on the Lyall Bay specimen reported by Kirk (1880:312), but this record has been called into question as the gladius of this specimen—which should approximate the mantle in length—was said to be only 190 cm long (Greshko, 2016).
Onykia robusta (robust clubhook squid)	200 cm	Norman (2000:174); Bolstad (2008:107); Okutani (2015b)	Kubodera et al. (1998) give a maximum of at least 161.5 cm ML. The largest specimen seen by Bolstad (2008:107) had a mantle length of 197 cm (USNM 816872; specimen of indeterminate sex from 51°46.9′N 177°39.7′E). Verrill (1876:237) reported a specimen with a mantle length of 232 cm (91.5 in) and a total length of 4.3 m (14 ft) (excluding the ends of the tentacles, which had been destroyed). Nesis (1987:192) likewise gave a maximum mantle length of 230 cm, but Roper & Jereb (2010i:364) wrote that "this old record might be in error", with the species commonly growing to 160 cm ML. Previously known as Moroteuthis robusta (see Bolstad, 2008; Bolstad, 2010).
Megalocranchia maxima	185 cm (female)	Kubodera & Horikawa (2005:210)	Size of female caught off Motobu Peninsula, Okinawa, Japan, identified as "Megalocranchia cf. maxima" (see Kubodera & Horikawa, 2005:223 for photograph). This species is listed under the name Megalocranchia fisheri in many older sources. Tsuchiya & Okutani (1993), Roper & Jereb (2010c:171) and Okutani (2015a) give maximum of 180 cm, and Norman (2000:158) gives the same for M. fisheri. This species may also be conspecific with Megalocranchia abyssicola (Glaubrecht & Salcedo-Vargas, 2004:65).
Taningia danae (Dana octopus squid)	170 cm	Nesis (1982); Roper & Jereb (2010h:266)	The largest well documented specimen is a 160 cm ML mature female from the North Atlantic (Roper & Vecchione, 1993:449).
Dosidicus gigas (Humboldt squid)	150 cm	Wormuth (1976:38); Norman (2000:165); Glaubrecht & Salcedo-Vargas (2004:54)	According to Wormuth (1976:38), specimens reaching 150 cm ML are "not uncommon" off Peru. Roper et al. (2010b:301) give a maximum mantle length of 120 cm for specimens off Chile and around 100 cm for northern populations, with a more typical mantle length of up to 50–80 cm. The review article of Nigmatullin et al. (2001)—based on c. 230 published papers on the species, in addition to other catch data—also gives a maximum mantle length of 120 cm.
Kondakovia longimana (giant warty squid)	≈150 cm (estimate; female)	Bolstad (2008:171)	Estimated size of damaged female (NMV F109447; specimen with 21 mm LRL from 63°04.72′S 62°56.02′E). O'Shea (2003b) estimated maximum mantle length as probably exceeding 115 cm. Largest complete specimen measured 108 cm ML (Lynnes & Rodhouse, 2002:1087; Roper & Jereb, 2010i:366).
Mastigoteuthis cordiformis	100 cm or more	Roper & Jereb (2010g:253)	Based on unpublished reports; largest verified ML is 70 cm (Roper & Jereb, 2010g:253).
Lepidoteuthis grimaldii (Grimaldi scaled squid)	100 cm	Roper & Jereb (2010e:240)	
Myopsida (myopsid squids)
Species	Maximum mantle length	References	Notes
Loligo forbesi (long finned squid)	93.7 cm		Maximum mantle length is 93.7 cm in males and 46.2 cm in females.
Octopoda (octopuses)
Species	Maximum mantle length	References	Notes
Haliphron atlanticus (seven-arm octopus)	69 cm (female)	O'Shea (2002:1); O'Shea (2004a:9); Finn (2014a:227)	Mantle length of incomplete 2.90 m TL mature female, measured defrosted and wet, prior to fixing. Isolated beaks of comparable size to that of this specimen were recorded by Clarke (1986:247–248). The sexually dimorphic males reach a mantle length of over 10 cm (Finn, 2014a:227).
Enteroctopus dofleini (giant Pacific octopus)	at least 60 cm	Norman (2000:214); Norman et al. (2014:124)	
Sepiida (cuttlefish)
Species	Maximum mantle length	References	Notes
Sepia apama (Australian giant cuttlefish)	50 cm	Reid et al. (2005:68)	
Sepia latimanus (broadclub cuttlefish)	50 cm	Reid et al. (2005:92)	
Sepia hierredda	<50 cm	Reid et al. (2005:88)	
Sepia officinalis (European common cuttlefish)	49 cm	Reid et al. (2005:99)	
Sepia pharaonis (pharaoh cuttlefish)	42 cm	Reid et al. (2005:107)	
Sepia lycidas (kisslip cuttlefish)	38 cm	Reid et al. (2005:96)	
Sepia ramani	37.5 cm	Reid et al. (2005:114)	
Vampyromorphida (vampire squid) – single extant species
Species	Maximum mantle length	References	Notes
Vampyroteuthis infernalis (vampire squid)	13 cm	Nesis (1982); Norman & Finn (2014:269)	
Sepiolida (bobtail squids)
Species	Maximum mantle length	References	Notes
Austrorossia antillensis	9 cm	Reid & Jereb (2005:192)	
Rossia pacifica	9 cm (female)	Reid & Jereb (2005:185)	Males grow to 4.5 cm in mantle length.
Rossia macrosoma	8.5 cm	Reid & Jereb (2005:184)	More typically the mantle length is 2.0–6.0 cm.
Neorossia caroli	8.3 cm (female)	Reid & Jereb (2005:190)	Males grow to 5.1 cm in mantle length.
Spirulida (spirula) – single extant species
Species	Maximum mantle length	References	Notes
Spirula spirula (ram's horn squid)	rarely exceeds 4.5 cm	Reid (2005:211)	

==== Total length ====
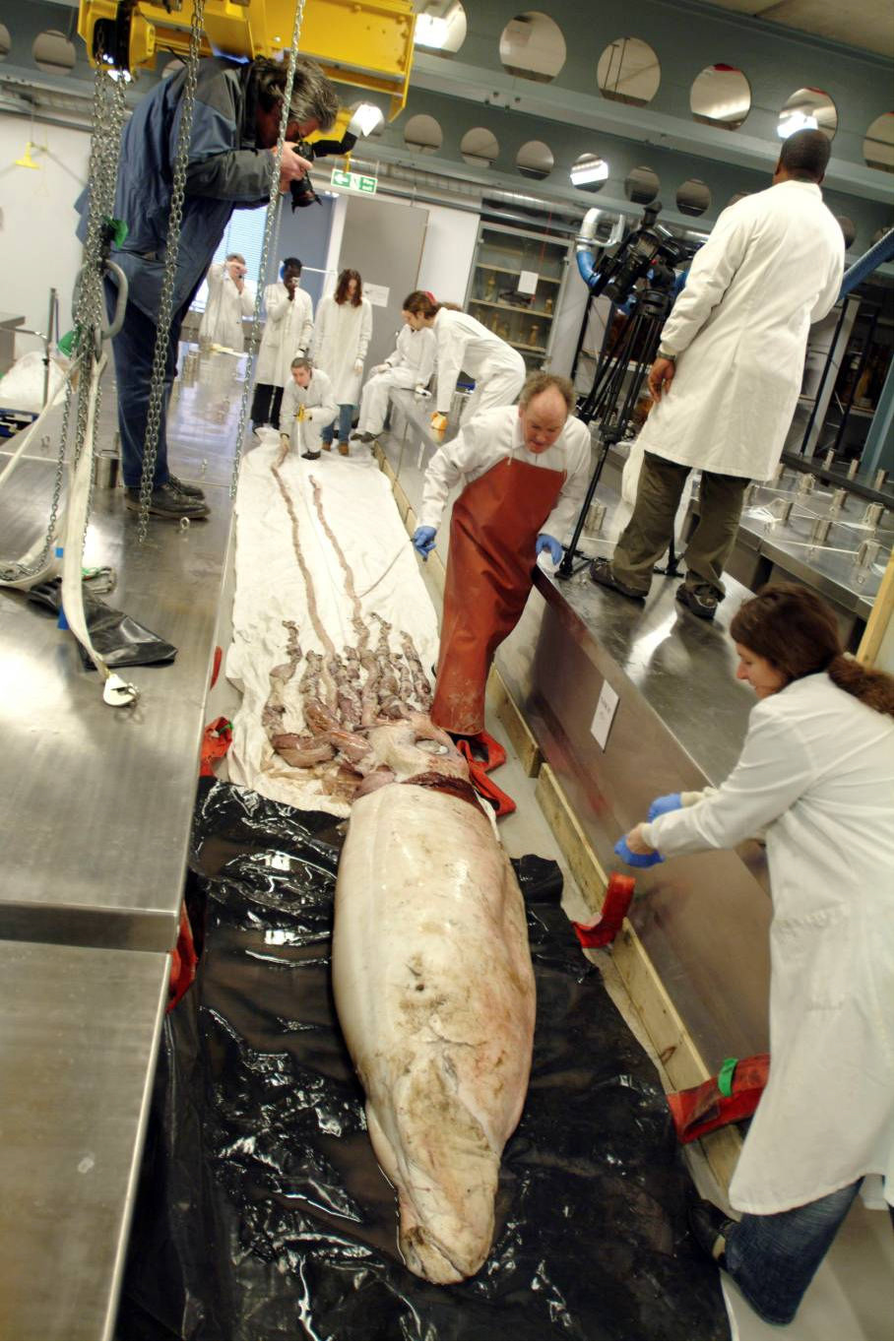
'Archie', a giant squid specimen at the Natural History Museum in London, measures 8.62 m (28.3 ft) in total length (see Ablett, 2012 for more on this specimen)

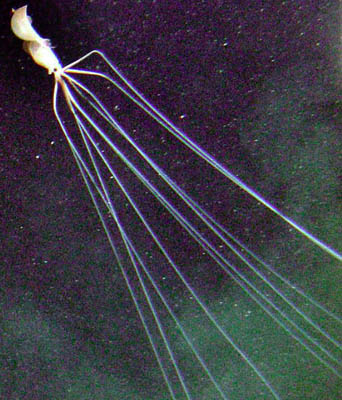
A bigfin squid (cf. Magnapinna), one of the longest known cephalopods. This specimen was filmed in October 2000 by DSV Alvin in the Gulf of Mexico, at 1,940 m (6,360 ft) depth.

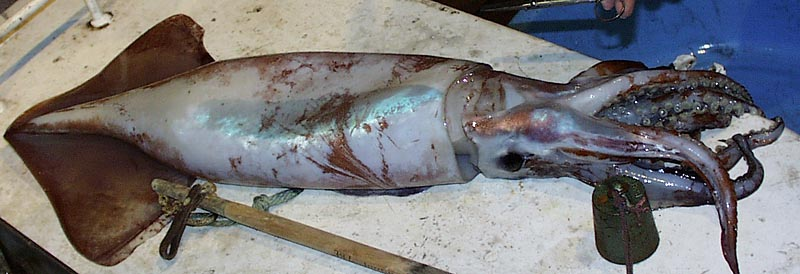
A freshly caught specimen of Ommastrephes bartramii from northern Hawaiian waters. This species grows to a total length of 2 m (6.6 ft).

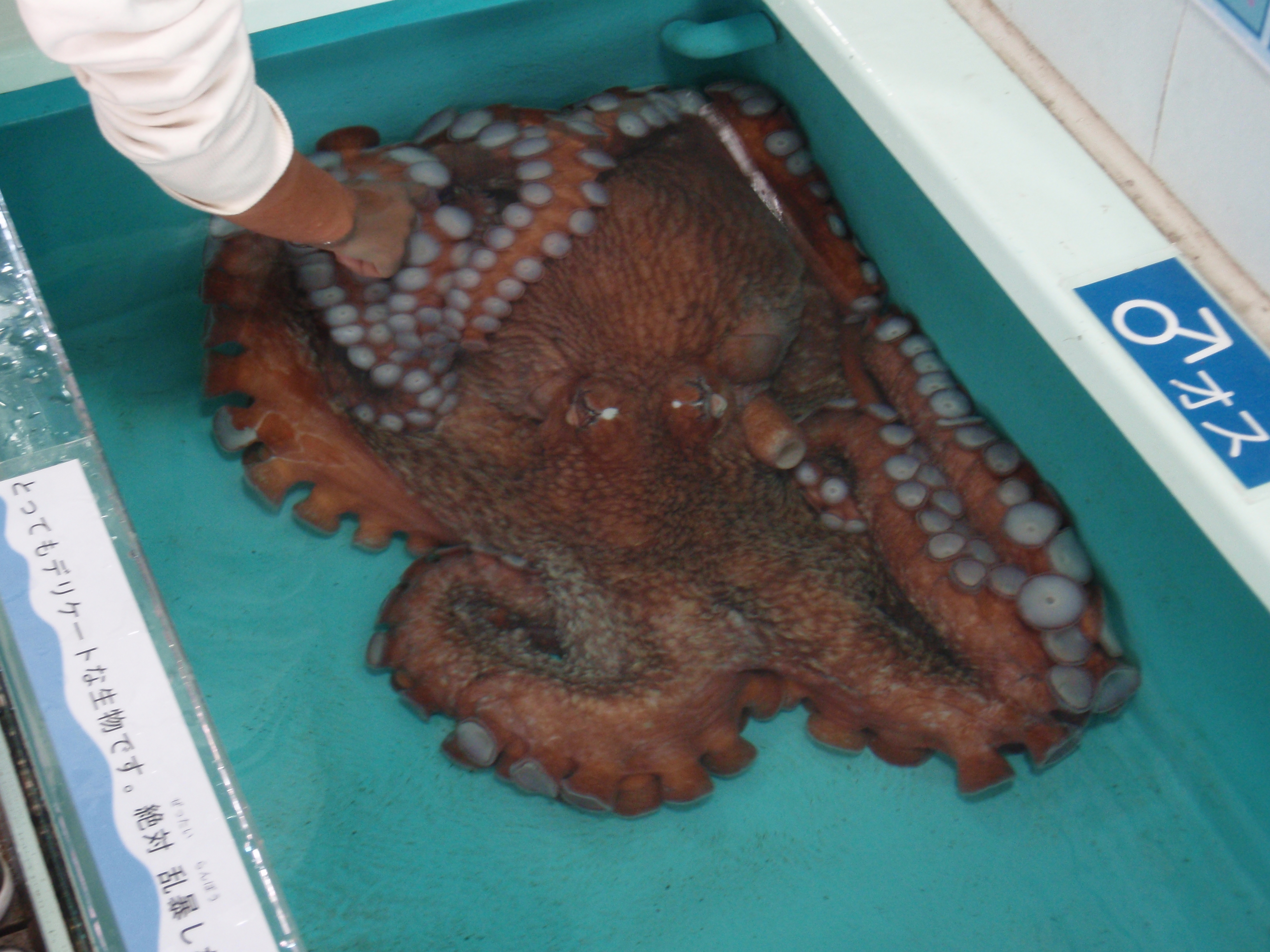
Large specimens of Enteroctopus dofleini can exceed 3 m (9.8 ft) in total length.

The longest scientifically documented specimens belong to the giant squid, with a maximum total length of 14–15 m (46–49 ft) (Roper & Shea, 2013:114). Despite its proportionally shorter tentacles, the colossal squid may rival the giant squid in total length, but the species's size limits are uncertain because only a handful of mature specimens have been recorded.

Teuthida (squids)
Species	Maximum total length	References	Notes
Architeuthis dux (giant squid)	14–15 m (female)	Roper & Shea (2013:114)	Based on a 40-year data set of more than 50 specimens, Roper & Shea (2013:114) suggest an average total length at maturity of 11 m and a "rarely encountered maximum length" of 14–15 m. Of the nearly 100 specimens examined by Roper, the largest was "46 feet (14 m) long" (Cerullo & Roper, 2012:22). O'Shea & Bolstad (2008) give a maximum total length of 13 m for females based on the examination of more than 130 specimens, measured post mortem and relaxed, as well as beaks recovered from sperm whales (which do not exceed the size of those found in the largest complete specimens). O'Shea estimated the maximum total length for males at 10 m (O'Shea, 2003a). Older records of 18 m or more were likely exaggerated by stretching of the long feeding tentacles or resulted from inadequate measurement methods such as pacing (O'Shea & Bolstad, 2008; Roper & Shea, 2013:113). Paxton (2016a) performed a statistical analysis using literature records of giant squid specimens and concluded that "squid with a conservative TL of 20 m would seem likely based on current data", but the study has been heavily criticised by experts in the field (Greshko, 2016).
Mesonychoteuthis hamiltoni (colossal squid)	approaching 9–10 m (estimate)	Roper & Jereb (2010c:173)	The maximum confirmed total length for this species is 6 m (Rosa et al., 2017). Two specimens of M. hamiltoni recovered from the stomachs of sperm whales between 1956 and 1957 off the South Shetland Islands and South Orkney Islands—both initially identified as Architeuthis—reportedly measured around 10 and 12 m, respectively (Sweeney & Roper, 2001:56; see Korabelnikov, 1959:103 and Yukhov, 1974:62). Estimated maximum lengths as great as 12–14 m have appeared in the popular literature (see Anderton, 2007).
cf. Magnapinna (bigfin squid)	≈7 m (estimate)	Vecchione et al. (2001a:2505); Vecchione et al. (2001b); Glaubrecht & Salcedo-Vargas (2004:67); Roper & Jereb (2010f:247)	Estimate based on specimen observed by commercial ROV operated from the oil-drilling ship Millennium Explorer in January 2000, Mississippi Canyon, Gulf of Mexico (28°37′N 88°0′W), at a depth of 2195 m (Vecchione et al., 2001b). Bolstad (2003) gives an estimate of at least 8 m TL for the largest observed specimen.
Asperoteuthis acanthoderma	5.5 m (+)	Tsuchiya & Okutani (1993)	Total length of immature specimen measuring 0.45 m ML. Much larger specimens of up to 92 cm ML are known (see Kubodera & Horikawa, 2005:223 for photograph).
Onykia robusta (robust clubhook squid)	4.3 m (14 ft) (+)	Verrill (1876:237)	Total length of specimen missing ends of tentacles, with a mantle length of 2.32 m (91.5 in) according to Verrill (1876:237). Glaubrecht & Salcedo-Vargas (2004:66) give maximum total length of 4–6 m. Previously known as Moroteuthis robusta (see Bolstad, 2008; Bolstad, 2010).
Galiteuthis phyllura	? over 4 m (estimate)	Nesis (1985); Ellis (1998a:149); Glaubrecht & Salcedo-Vargas (2004:65)	Estimate based on 0.40 m long arm and 1.15 m tentacle from the Sea of Okhotsk. Roper & Jereb (2010c:165) cast doubt on the validity of this record.
Dosidicus gigas (Humboldt squid)	possibly up to 3.7 m (12 ft)	Clarke (1966:117); Glaubrecht & Salcedo-Vargas (2004:59)	Specimens from the Northern Hemisphere are much smaller, with those off the Californian coast reaching total lengths of less than 1.7 m (Glaubrecht & Salcedo-Vargas, 2004:59). Roper et al. (2010b:301) give maximum total length of close to 2.5 m for specimens off Chile.
Megalocranchia maxima	2.7 m (+) (female)	Young & Mangold (2010)	Total length of 1.65 m ML female taken off Hawaii (see Young & Mangold, 2010 for photograph). Larger specimens of up to 1.85 m ML have been recorded, and these clearly exceed 2.7 m TL (see Kubodera & Horikawa, 2005:223 for photograph).
Taningia danae (Dana octopus squid)	2.3 m (female)	Roper & Vecchione (1993:444)	Total length of mature female measuring 160 cm in mantle length, taken from frozen specimen.
Kondakovia longimana (giant warty squid)	2.25 m (+)	Lynnes & Rodhouse (2002:1087)	Size of largest complete specimen (1.08 m ML), found floating at surface off South Orkney Islands (see also Carrington, 2000). Much larger specimens up to an estimated 1.5 m ML are known (Bolstad, 2008:171).
Octopoda (octopuses)
Species	Maximum total length	References	Notes
Enteroctopus dofleini (giant Pacific octopus)	>6.1 m	Cosgrove (1987)	Norman et al. (2014:124) give the maximum total length as "more than 3 m". Questionable length records of up to 9.8 m can be found in the literature (see High, 1976:18).
Cirrina gen. et sp. indet.	over 4 m (estimate)	Voss (1988); Vecchione et al. (2008)	Estimate based on photographic record; finned octopods are known with certainty to reach at least 1.7 m in total length (Collins et al., 2001).
Haliphron atlanticus (seven-arm octopus)	4 m (estimate; female)	O'Shea (2004a:9); Finn (2014a:227)	Estimate based on incomplete 2.90 m mature female, measured defrosted and wet, prior to fixing. Isolated beaks of comparable size to that of this specimen were recorded by Clarke (1986:247–248). Males are estimated to reach a total length of 21 cm (Finn, 2014a:227) and perhaps as much as 30 cm (Norman et al., 2002:733).
Vampyromorphida (vampire squid) – single extant species
Species	Maximum total length	References	Notes
Vampyroteuthis infernalis (vampire squid)	≈30 cm	Norman & Finn (2014:269)	

==== Mass ====
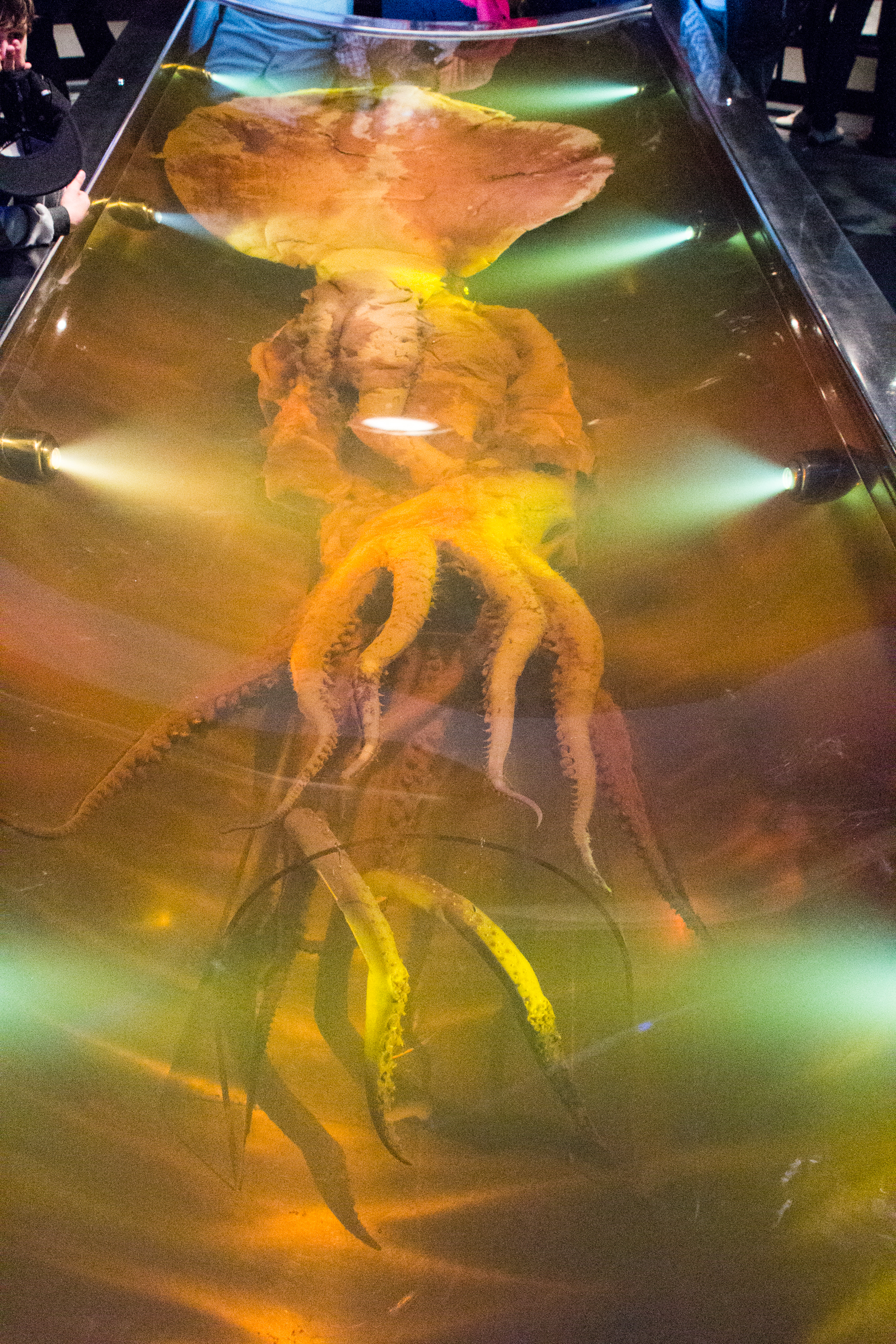
The 495-kilogram (1,091 lb) colossal squid on display at the Museum of New Zealand Te Papa Tongarewa. It is the most massive extant cephalopod on record.

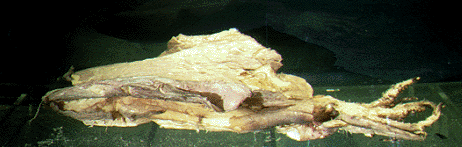
The largest documented specimen of T. danae, preserved at the National Museum of Natural History. It originally weighed 161.4 kg (356 lb) and had a mantle length of 160 cm (5.2 ft).

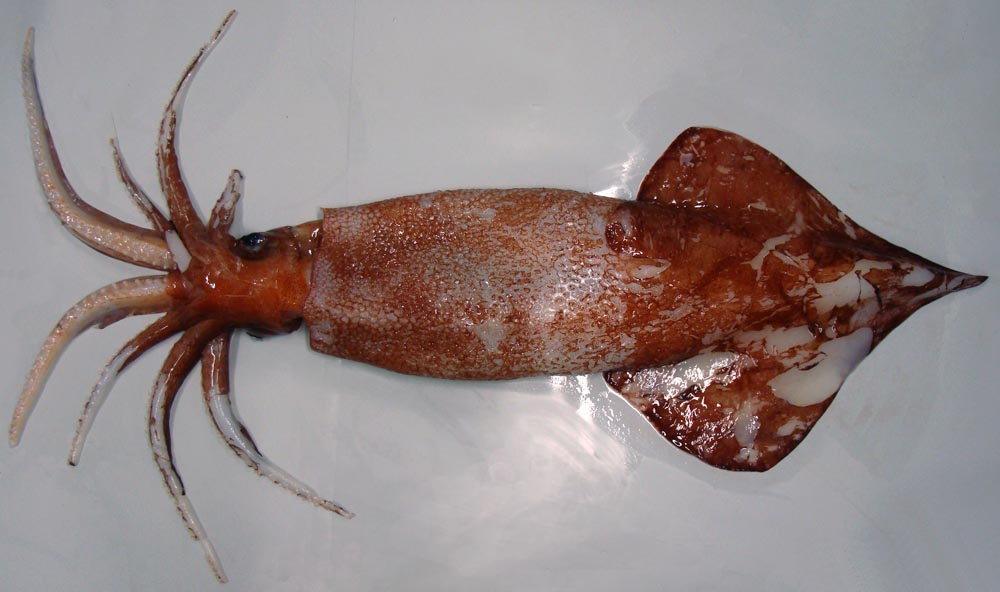
A very large mature female of Onykia robsoni with a mantle length of 88.5 cm (2.90 ft) and total weight of 11.1 kg (24 lb)

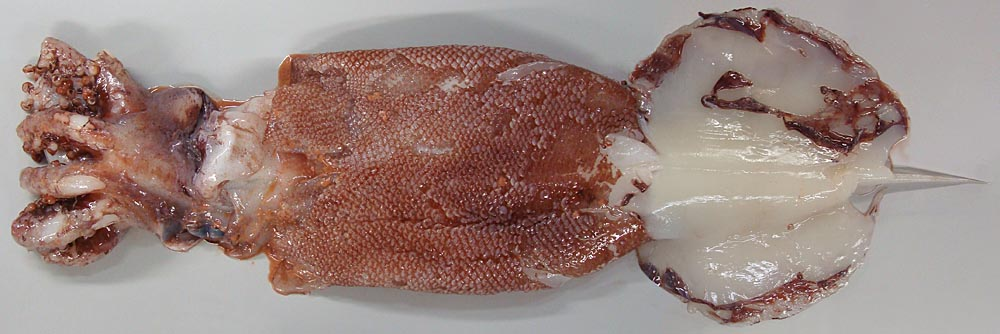
Lepidoteuthis grimaldii female measuring 61.7 cm (2.02 ft) in mantle length and weighing 4.07 kg (9.0 lb), from the Chatham Rise off New Zealand (note the prominent dermal cushions, likely used for buoyancy)

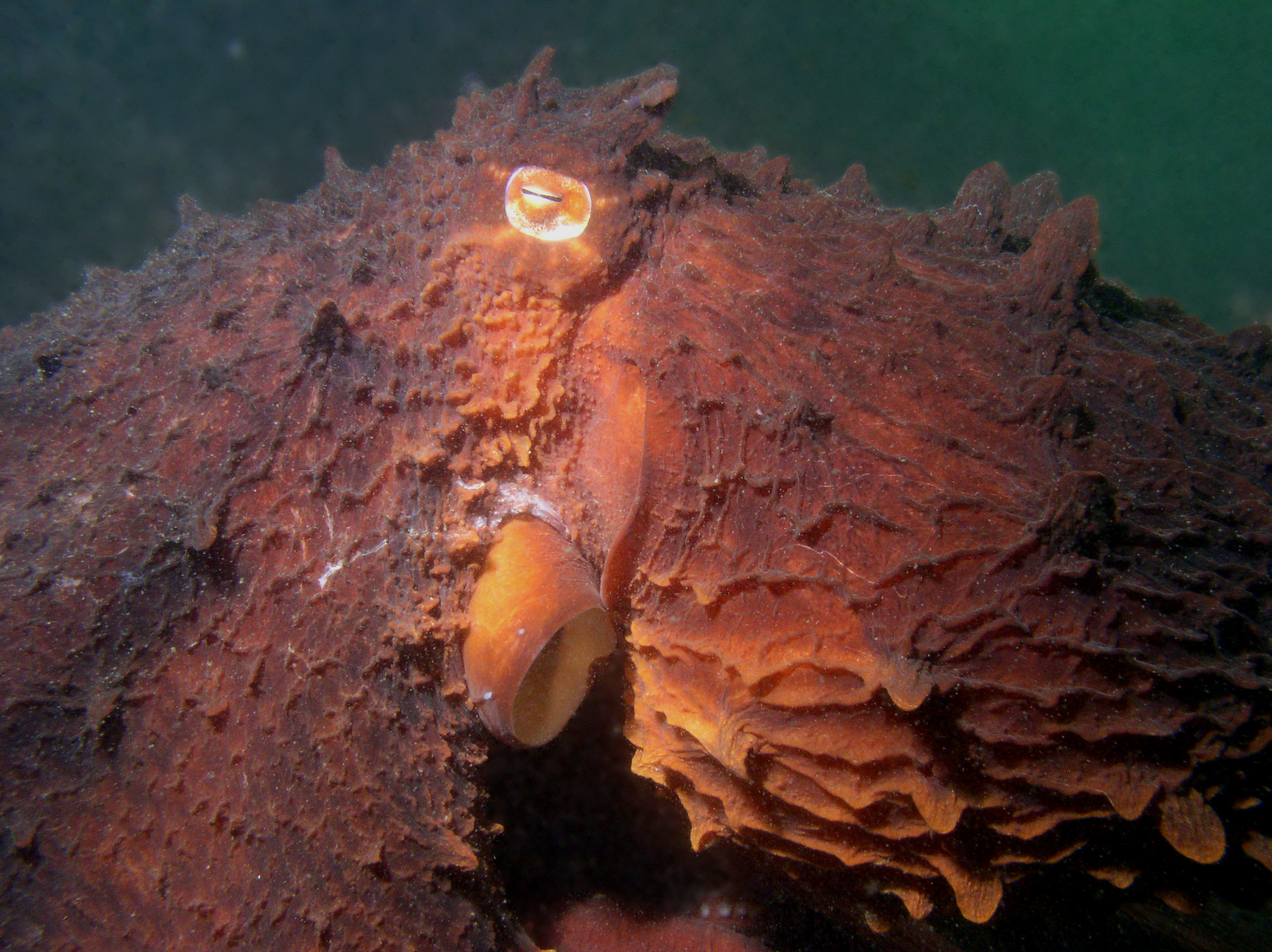
The maximum weight of the giant Pacific octopus (Enteroctopus dofleini) has been much debated, with numerous reports of specimens exceeding 100 kg (220 lb)

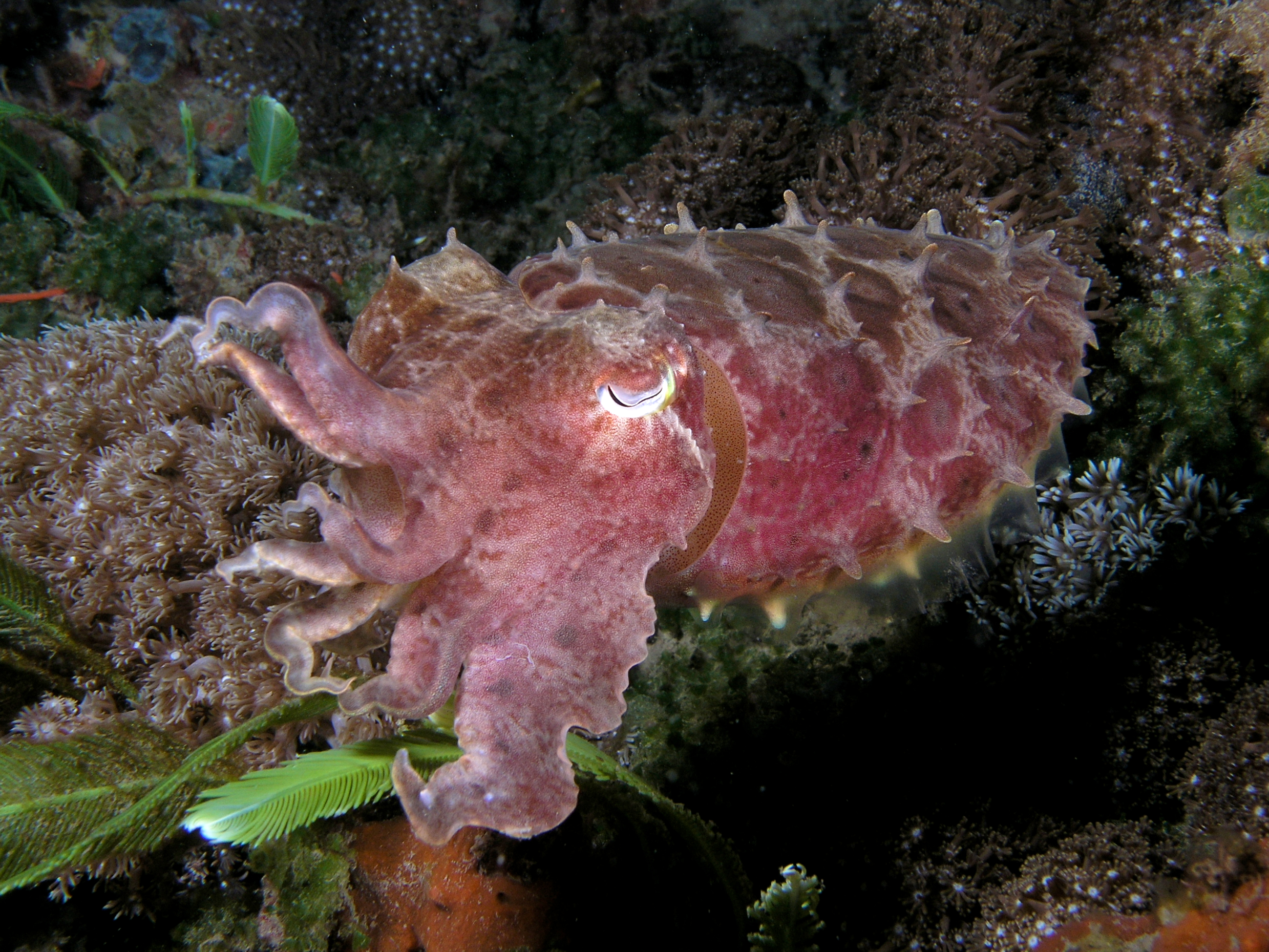
Sepia latimanus is the second largest cuttlefish species, closely rivalling S. apama in both mantle length and mass.

The heaviest known cephalopod, and the largest living invertebrate, is the colossal squid. The largest recorded specimen of this species, caught in the Ross Sea in 2007, weighed 495 kg (1,091 lb). However, its beak is not the largest known from this species; even bigger colossal squid beaks have been recovered from the stomachs of sperm whales, indicating that this species can grow larger still.

Teuthida (squids)
Species	Maximum mass	References	Notes
Mesonychoteuthis hamiltoni (colossal squid)	495 kg (female)	[Anonymous] (N.d.); Guerra & Segonzac (2014:65); Rosa et al. (2017)	Weight of mature female specimen caught in February 2007, measured after thawing. This specimen was originally estimated to weigh 450 kg (Anderton, 2007). Several other specimens with weights in the hundreds of kilograms have been recorded. Beaks recovered from sperm whale stomachs indicate the existence of even larger specimens, perhaps weighing as much as 600–700 kg ([Anonymous], N.d.).
Architeuthis dux (giant squid)	275 kg (female)	O'Shea (2003a); Grist & Jackson (2007:386); Guerra & Segonzac (2014:65)	Maximum size based on the examination of some 105 specimens by O'Shea (2003a), as well as beaks recovered from sperm whales (which do not exceed the size of those found in the largest complete specimens). Maximum weight for males has been estimated at 150 kg (O'Shea, 2003a; see also Grist & Jackson, 2007:386), though heavier specimens have occasionally been reported (see Deagle et al., 2005 for 190 kg specimen, Hofilena, 2014 for 163 kg specimen). Roper & Jereb (2010a:121) give a maximum weight of up to 500 kg, and "possibly greater". Discredited weights of as much as a tonne or more are not uncommon in older literature (O'Shea & Bolstad, 2008).
Taningia danae (Dana octopus squid)	161.4 kg (female)	Roper & Jereb (2010h:266)	Weight of 160 cm ML mature female from North Atlantic. Specimen weighed prior to freezing (Roper & Vecchione, 1993:444). According to Roper & Jereb (2010h:266), the previously reported maximum weight of 61.4 kg (based on the same specimen) stems from a typographical error in the original paper of Roper & Vecchione (1993). This lower value was repeated by a number of subsequent authors, including Santos et al. (2001:355) and Kubodera et al. (2006:1029).
Onykia robusta (robust clubhook squid)	50 kg	Roper et al. (1984); Roper & Jereb (2010i:364); Guerra & Segonzac (2014:65); Okutani (2015b)	Previously known as Moroteuthis robusta (see Bolstad, 2008; Bolstad, 2010).
Dosidicus gigas (Humboldt squid)	50 kg	Nigmatullin et al. (2001:10); Roper et al. (2010b:301); [Anonymous] (N.d.)	Commonly reaches a maximum weight of around 20–30 kg (Roper et al., 2010b:301). In their introduction to the family Ommastrephidae, Roper et al. (2010b:269) give a maximum weight of 55–65 kg, but this is contradicted later in the same work by the 50 kg figure in the main species account. Guerra & Segonzac (2014:65) give a maximum weight of 90 kg.
Kondakovia longimana (giant warty squid)	50 kg (estimate)	Guerra & Segonzac (2014:65)	Largest complete specimen, found floating at surface off South Orkney Islands, had a wet weight of 29 kg and a mantle length of 108 cm (Lynnes & Rodhouse, 2002:1087; see also Carrington, 2000), but a damaged female specimen with an estimated mantle length of around 150 cm is known (Bolstad, 2008:171).
Thysanoteuthis rhombus (diamondback squid)	30 kg	Miyahara et al. (2006); Roper & Jereb (2010k:385)	Probably exceeds the recorded mass of 30 kg according to Roper & Jereb (2010k:385).
Ommastrephes bartramii (neon flying squid)	20–25 kg (female)	Roper et al. (2010b:296)	Maximum size of specimens from North Atlantic and Southern Hemisphere (where males reach 2–2.2 kg). Females from the North Pacific are smaller (6 kg), but males may be larger (2–2.9 kg) (Roper et al., 2010b:296).
Megalocranchia maxima	23.9 kg (52.7 lb) (+)	[Anonymous] (2015b); Mosendz (2015)	Mass of specimen found floating dead off Hawaii, estimated to measure at least 2.1 m (7 ft) TL, tentatively identified as Megalocranchia fisheri. Larger specimens reaching and even exceeding 2.7 m TL have been recorded, though were apparently not weighed (see Kubodera & Horikawa, 2005:223; Young & Mangold, 2010).
Onykia robsoni (rugose hooked squid)	11.1 kg (female)	Vecchione et al. (2011)	Weight of mature female (88.5 cm ML) caught in bottom trawl at 685–700 m depth over Chatham Rise (44°21′S 175°32′E). Previously known as Moroteuthis robsoni (see Bolstad, 2008; Bolstad, 2010).
Octopoda (octopuses)
Species	Maximum mass	References	Notes
Enteroctopus dofleini (giant Pacific octopus)	? >180 kg	Norman et al. (2014:124)	Cosgrove (1987) and Cosgrove & McDaniel (2009:69) gave a maximum confirmed weight of 71 kg for a live specimen collected in the mid-1960s (McClain et al., 2015). There exists a dubious record of a 272 kg specimen which is sometimes cited as the largest known (see High, 1976:18; Hochberg & Fields, 1980:436; Lewy, 2002:65), although it was never actually collected and weighed (Newman, 1994:66; McClain et al., 2015). Norman et al. (2014:124) accept a maximum weight of at least 180 kg, which approximates the 182.3 kg reported for a specimen caught off Santa Barbara, California, in 1945, of which photographic evidence survives (Cosgrove & McDaniel, 2009:67–69). No specimens approaching this size have been reported since the middle of the 20th century, with recent specimens very rarely exceeding 50 kg (Cosgrove & McDaniel, 2009:71). It is possible that the maximum size of the species has decreased over this period, perhaps due to bioaccumulation of toxicants (Anderson, 2003:3; Cosgrove & McDaniel, 2009:71).
Haliphron atlanticus (seven-arm octopus)	75 kg (estimate; female)	O'Shea (2004a:9)	Estimate based on incomplete 61.0 kg mature female, measured defrosted and wet, prior to fixing. Isolated beaks of comparable size to that of the present specimen were recorded by Clarke (1986:247–248).
Sepiida (cuttlefish)
Species	Maximum mass	References	Notes
Sepia apama (Australian giant cuttlefish)	>10.5 kg	Reid et al. (2005:68)	
Sepia latimanus (broadclub cuttlefish)	10 kg	Reid et al. (2005:92)	
Sepia hierredda	>7.5 kg	Reid et al. (2005:88)	
Sepia lycidas (kisslip cuttlefish)	5 kg	Reid et al. (2005:96)	
Sepia pharaonis (pharaoh cuttlefish)	5 kg	Reid et al. (2005:107)	
Sepia officinalis (European common cuttlefish)	4 kg	Reid et al. (2005:99)	

==== Shell diameter ====
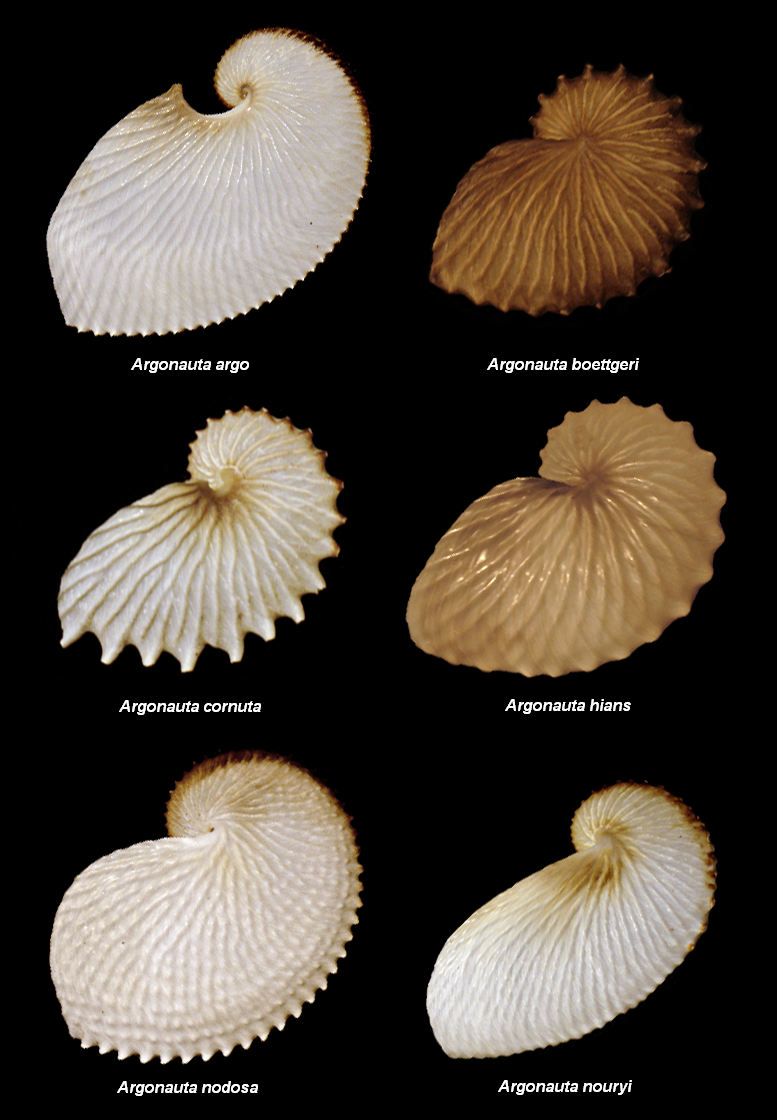
Eggcases of six extant Argonauta species (not to scale)

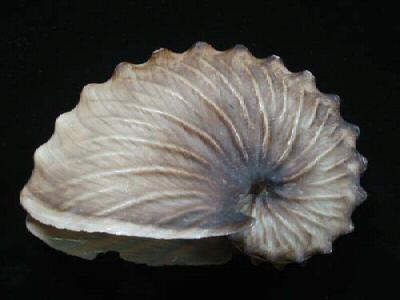
A giant specimen of Argonauta hians from Taiwan, which—at roughly 121.5 mm (4.78 in) in diameter—approximates the length of the official world record size shell.

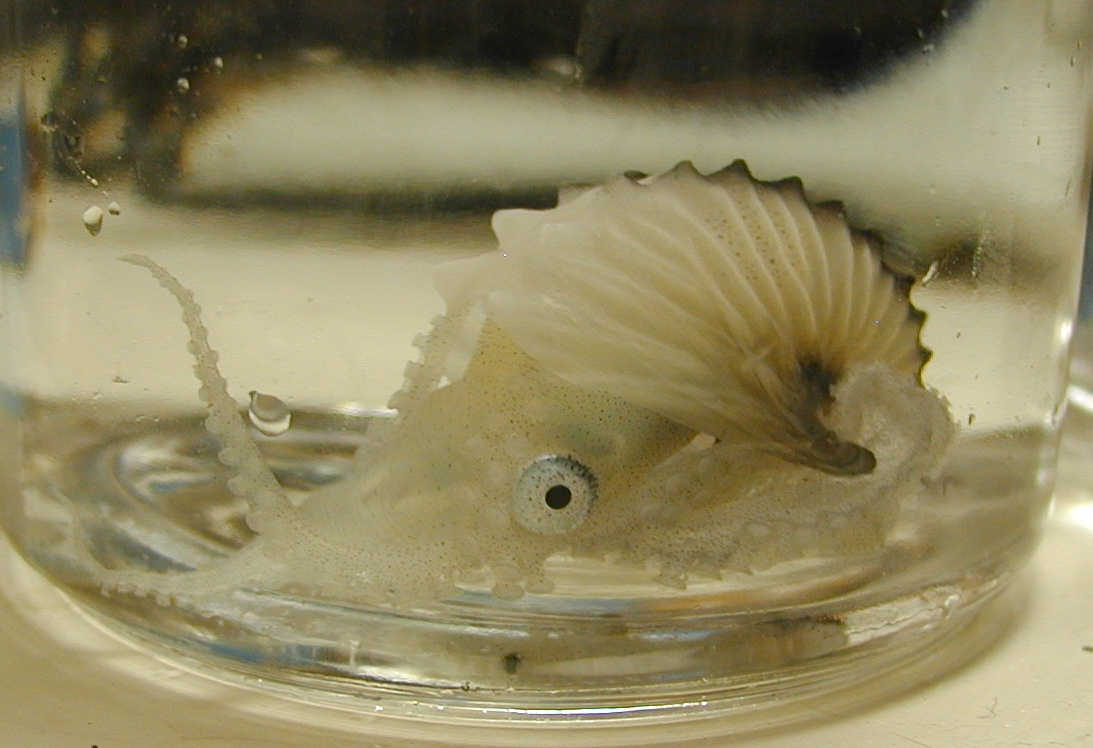
Young A. argo female with eggcase

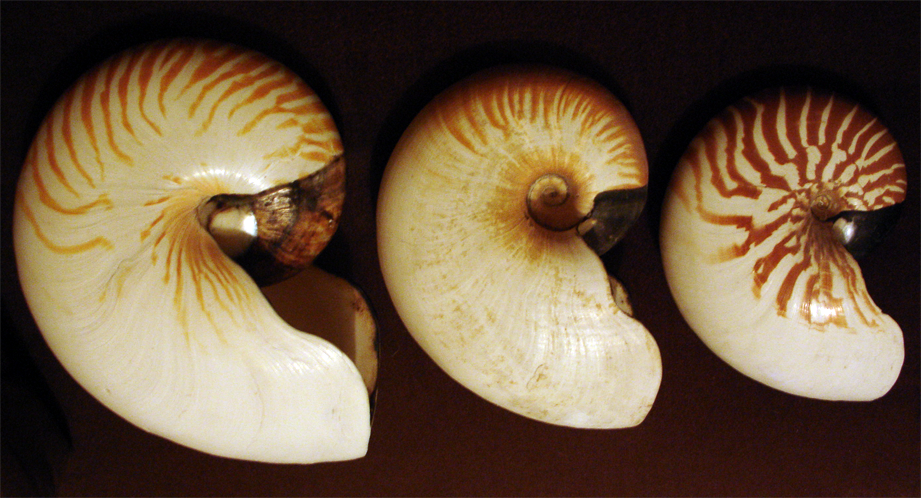
Nautilus shells: N. macromphalus (left), A. scrobiculatus (centre), and N. pompilius

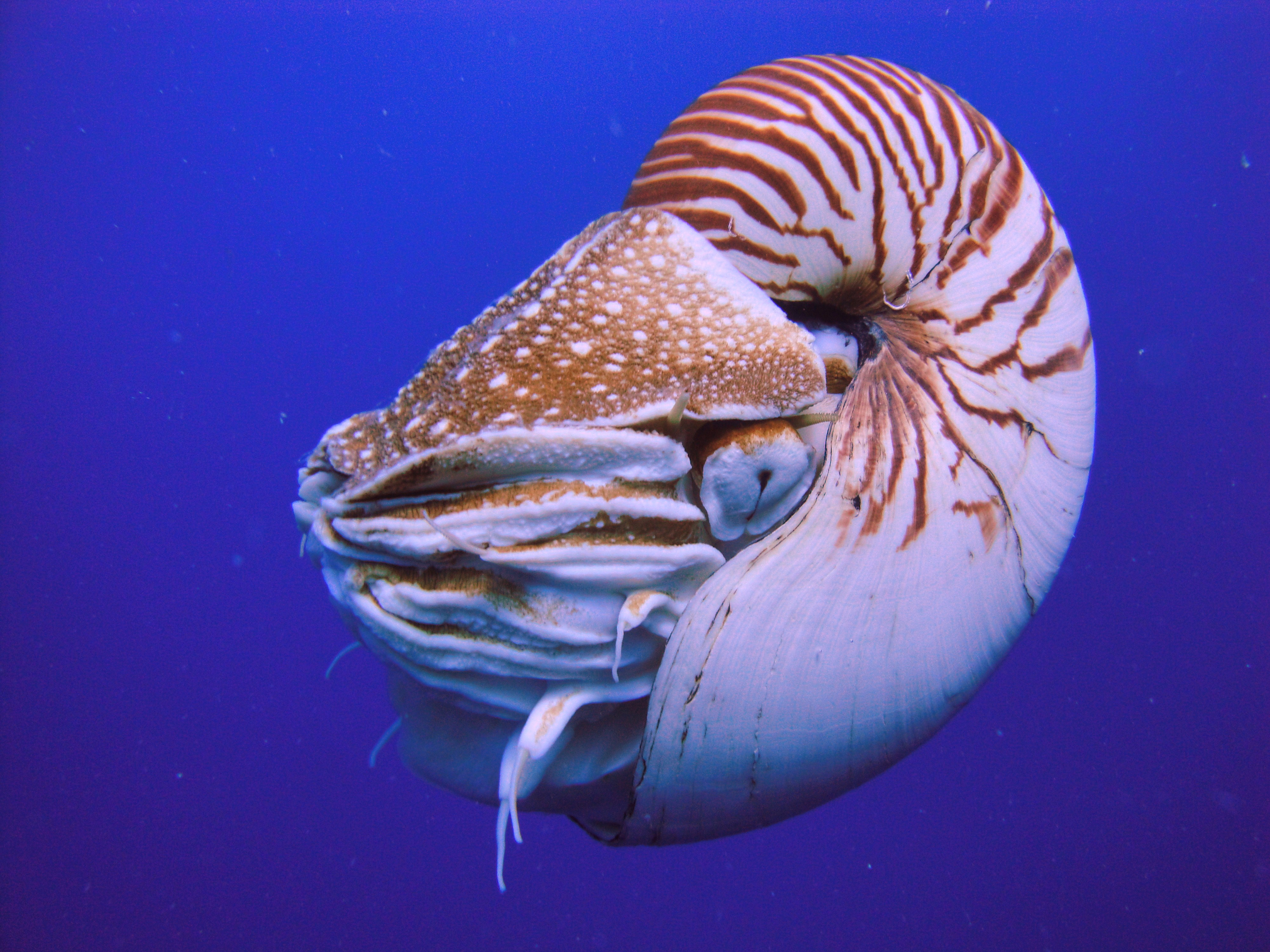
Nautilus belauensis off Palau

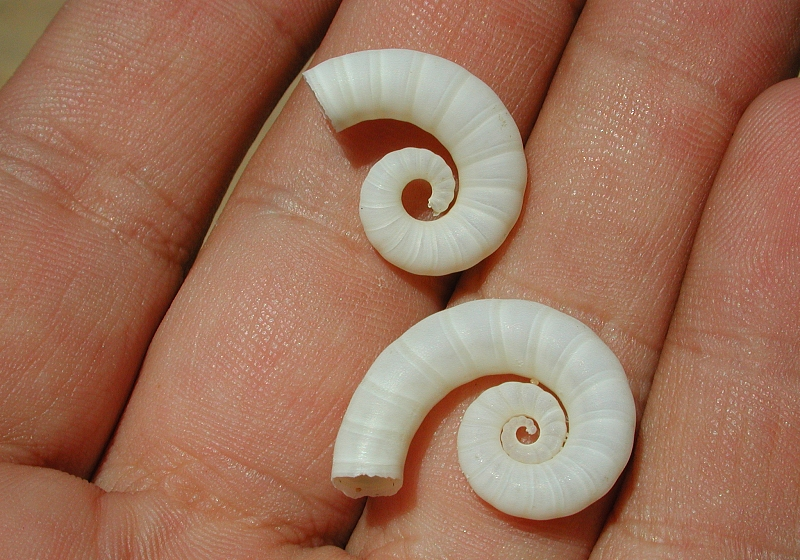
Two examples of the small internal shell of Spirula spirula

Nautiluses are the only extant cephalopods with a true external shell; in other groups the shell has been internalised or lost completely. Internal shells include the cuttlebones of cuttlefish, the gladii of squids and the vampire squid, the winged shells of cirrate octopods, and the spiral shells of Spirula. Additionally, females of the octopus genus Argonauta secrete a specialised paper-thin eggcase in which they reside, and this is popularly regarded as a "shell", although it is not attached to the body of the animal (see Finn, 2013).

Cephalopod shell diameter is of interest to teuthologists and conchologists alike. The Registry of World Record Size Shells, the most comprehensive publication on maximum shell size in marine molluscs, specifies that specimens "should be measured with vernier type calipers and should reflect the greatest measurable dimension of the shell in any direction including any processes of hard shell material produced by the animal (i.e. spines, wings, keels, siphonal canals, etc.) and not including attachments, barnacles, coralline algae, or any other encrusting organisms" (Pisor, 2008:14). Unlike most other measures of cephalopod size, shell diameter can be determined with a high degree of precision and usually leaves little room for ambiguity. For this reason it is usually recorded to the nearest one-tenth of a millimetre (0.0039 in), as is standard in conchology.

When the Registry of World Record Size Shells changed ownership in 2008 it was launched as an online database in addition to its print publication. Subsequent rule changes meant that all records required photographic verification. Over time, older records for which photographic evidence could not be obtained were removed from the database. As a result, some records from older editions of the registry actually exceed the size of the current official record holders, sometimes by considerable margins. Where this has occurred, the largest recorded size across all editions is shown first and any discrepancies or competing records are noted thereafter. Where a reliable literature record surpasses all specimens ever included in the registry, this is given instead and the registry record(s) noted thereafter. Pisor (2008) was the fifth and final print edition of the registry published prior to the rule change, and Barbier et al. (N.d.) is the current, continuously updated online database. The registry only covers the shells of nautiluses and Spirula and the eggcases of Argonauta.

Octopoda (octopuses) – all extant Argonauta species listed
Species	Maximum shell diameter	References	Notes
Argonauta argo (greater argonaut)	300.0 mm	Pisor (2008:22); Barbier et al. (N.d.)	Pisor (2008:22) listed this size for a specimen from Australia (registered in 1991; in collection of SIO). Barbier et al. (N.d.) list exactly the same size for a specimen from the Philippines (year given as 1985; in private collection of Beals Marty). For a discussion of maximum shell size in this species, see Finn (2013:199). The largest literature record (and the only one to exceed the official world record size) appears to be the rough upper limit of 12 in (304.8 mm) given by Webb (1945:13) for the species as a whole (Finn, 2013:199). Under Argonauta cygnus, Pisor (2008:22) listed a 220.0 mm record for a specimen from western Mexico (acquired in 1995; in collection of SIO). The same specimen was previously listed under Argonauta pacificus (as A. pacifica) by Pisor (2005:12). Both A. cygnus and A. pacificus are considered synonyms of A. argo by Finn (2013) and Finn (2014b).
Argonauta nodosus (knobbed argonaut)	292.0 mm	Pisor (2008:22)	Size of a specimen from South Australia (registered in 1977; in collection of AMNH). Barbier et al. (N.d.) list a record of 204.0 mm for a specimen from the "Tasmania area", Australia (year given as 2000; in private collection of B. Henke). For a discussion of maximum shell size in this species, see Finn (2013:167); a number of unconfirmed reports put the maximum size beyond 300 mm.
Argonauta hians (muddy argonaut)	121.61 mm	Barbier et al. (N.d.)	Size of a specimen from the Gulf of Aqaba, Red Sea (year given as 1995; in private collection of Simon Weigmann). Pisor (2008:22) listed a record of 112.6 mm for a specimen from the Philippines (registered in 1988; in private collection of Victor Dan). For a discussion of maximum shell size in this species, see Finn (2013:186); none of the records discussed therein exceed the current world record specimen.
Argonauta boettgeri (Note: The taxonomic validity of these Argonauta species is questionable. Finn (2013) and Finn (2014b) recognised only four species in the genus: A. argo (syn. A. cygnus, A. pacificus), A. hians (syn. A. boettgeri), A. nodosus, and A. nouryi (syn. A. cornutus).)	108.03 mm	Barbier et al. (N.d.)	Size of a specimen taken from the China Sea off Zhejiang Province by a local fisherman (year given as 2005; in private collection of Simon Weigmann). Pisor (2008:22) listed a record of 102.2 mm for a specimen from the Philippines (collected in 2005; in collection of Havelet Marine). Pisor (2005:12) listed a record of 67.0 mm for a specimen from Mozambique, which is the locus classicus of this species (registered in 2003; in private collection of Pete Stimpson).
Argonauta cornutus	98.7 mm	Barbier et al. (N.d.)	Size of a specimen from western Mexico (year given as 1985; in collection of W. D. Schroeder). Pisor (2008:22) listed possibly the same specimen, also from western Mexico, at 98.6 mm (collected in 1999; in private collection of W. D. Schroeder).
Argonauta nouryi	95.5 mm	Pisor (2008:22); Barbier et al. (N.d.)	Size of a specimen from California (collected in 1992; in collection of Havelet Marine). For a discussion of maximum shell size in this species, see Finn (2013:207); none of the records discussed therein exceed the current world record specimen (when including A. cornutus, which Finn treats as a synonym of A. nouryi).
Nautilida (nautiluses) – all extant species listed
Species	Maximum shell diameter	References	Notes
Nautilus pompilius pompilius (emperor nautilus)	254.0 mm	Pisor (2008:121); Barbier et al. (N.d.)	Size of a specimen from Indonesia (registered in 2003; in private collection of Pete Stimpson), listed as N. p. pompilius. Hutsell et al. (1997:48) listed a 253.0 mm specimen, also from Indonesia (collected in 1983; in private collection of Cecelia Abbott). Harasewych & Moretzsohn (2010:632) give a maximum shell diameter of 268 mm for this species, but this is based on an erroneous record. (Note: This record is based on a shell collected in 2001 from the Timor Sea off Indonesia, which was sold in 2003 as a specimen of N. repertus with a diameter of 268 mm (10.6 in). It was subsequently found to measure only around 243 mm (9.6 in) and the discrepancy was put down to an encoding mistake ([Anonymous], 2003a). Another specimen from the same locality, sold around the same time, was claimed to measure 255 mm (10.0 in) ([Anonymous], 2003b).) Under N. repertus (which is treated here in synonymy with N. p. pompilius; Jereb (2005:53) considered it a "questionable species"), Pisor (2005:93) listed a 230.0 mm record for a specimen from Indonesia (registered in 2000; in private collection of Pete Stimpson), Pisor (2008) did not include the taxon at all, while Barbier et al. (N.d.) list a record of 242.07 mm for a specimen from India (no year given; in private collection of Simon Weigmann). The largest albinistic N. p. pompilius is listed by Barbier et al. (N.d.) as a 175.0 mm specimen trawled at 400 m depth off Zamboanga in the Philippines (year given as 2013; in collection of Havelet Marine).
Nautilus stenomphalus (white-patch nautilus)	239.39 mm	Barbier et al. (N.d.)	Size of a specimen from Timor Island, Indonesia (year given as 2009; in private collection of Simon Weigmann). Under N. pompilius f. stenomphalus, Pisor (2008:121) listed a maximum shell diameter of 221.0 mm for a specimen from the Philippines (no year given; in collection of Havelet Marine).
Nautilus belauensis (Palau nautilus)	239 mm	Grulke (2016:76)	Grulke (2016:76) gives an adult shell size range of 180–239 mm, and a mean adult shell diameter of 200 mm. Jereb (2005:54) gives 226 mm as the maximum size for the species, with no reference to a particular specimen. Pisor (2008:121) and Barbier et al. (N.d.) list a record of 221.0 mm for a specimen from Babeldaob, Palau (year given as 1980; in collection of Havelet Marine).
Nautilus pompilius suluensis	220.0 mm	Barbier et al. (N.d.)	Size of a specimen from the Philippines (year given as 2000; in private collection of Pete Stimpson). Pisor (2008:121) listed a maximum shell diameter of 148.0 mm for a specimen from the Philippines (registered in 2000; in private collection of Pete Stimpson). N. p. suluensis is a dwarf form from the Sulu Sea that has the smallest mean shell diameter of all known extant nautilus populations, at 115.6 mm (Dunstan et al., 2011).
Allonautilus scrobiculatus (crusty nautilus)	215.0 mm	Pisor (2005:93)	Size of a specimen from the Philippines (registered in 2000; in private collection of Pete Stimpson), listed as Nautilus scrobiculatus. Pisor (2008) did not include this species at all. Barbier et al. (N.d.) list a record of 214.0 mm for a specimen from Indonesia (year given as 2013; in private collection of Pete Stimpson).
Nautilus macromphalus (bellybutton nautilus)	180.62 mm	Barbier et al. (N.d.)	Size of a specimen from New Caledonia (year given as 2008; in private collection of Simon Weigmann). Pisor (2008:121) listed a maximum shell diameter of 180.0 mm for a specimen from New Caledonia (collected in 1995; in private collection of Kent Trego).
Allonautilus perforatus	around 180 mm	Jereb (2005:55); Grulke (2016:83)	Given as the maximum size for the species, with no reference to a particular specimen. Jereb (2005:55) considered A. perforatus a "[v]ery rare form of questionable validity".
Spirulida (spirula) – single extant species
Species	Maximum shell diameter	References	Notes
Spirula spirula (ram's horn squid)	28.8 mm	[Anonymous] (2003c)	Size of a specimen from Samar Island, the Philippines (collected in 2003). Pisor (2008:139) and Barbier et al. (N.d.) list a record of 27.2 mm for a specimen from Phuket Island, Thailand (collected c. 2000; in collection of Havelet Marine; see [Anonymous], 2006 for online record).

==== Extinct taxa ====
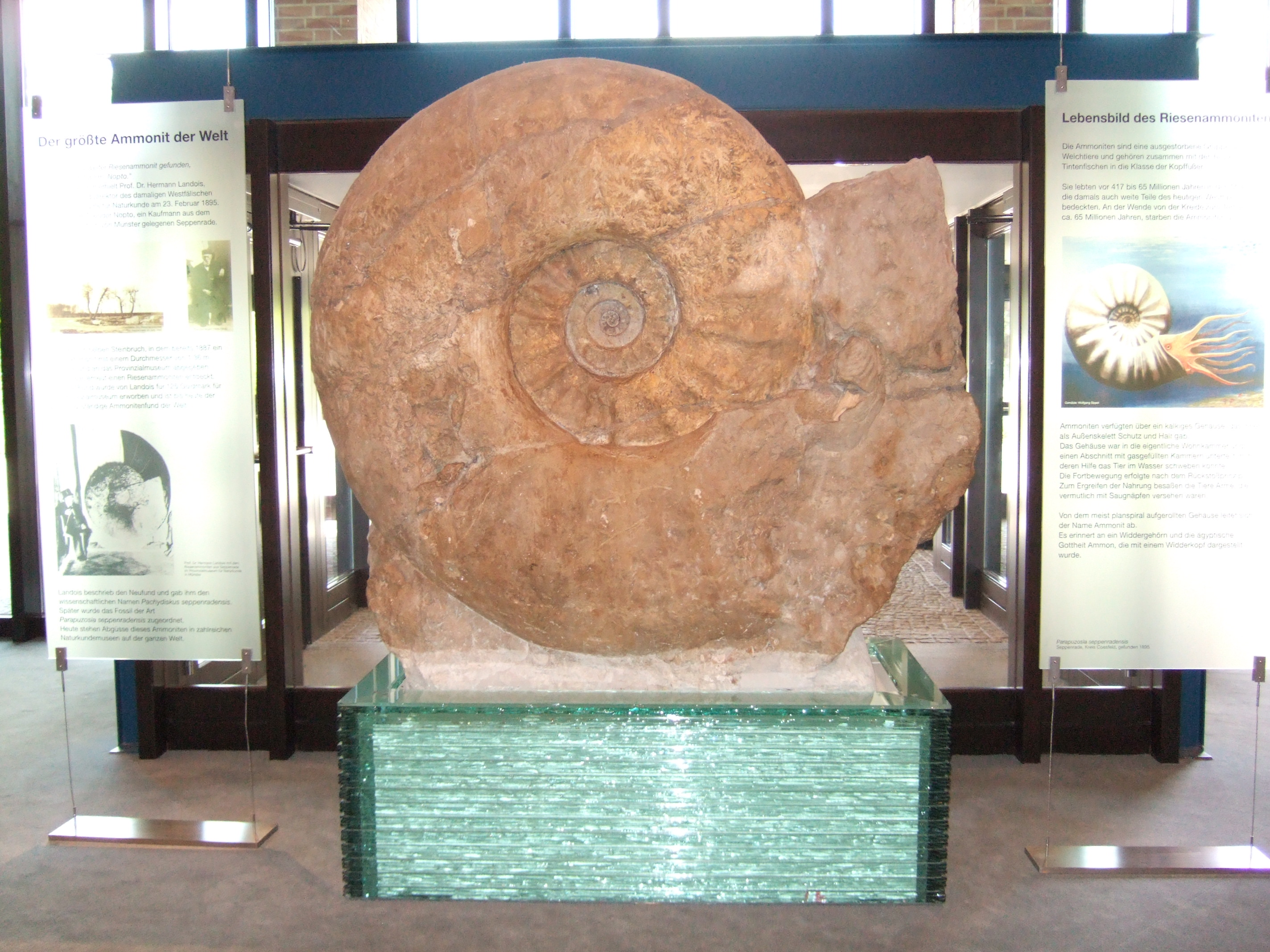
The largest ammonite ever found, a specimen of Parapuzosia seppenradensis measuring 1.742 m (5.72 ft) in diameter. The fossil pictured is the original held at the Westfälisches Museum für Naturkunde in Münster, but many casts exist.

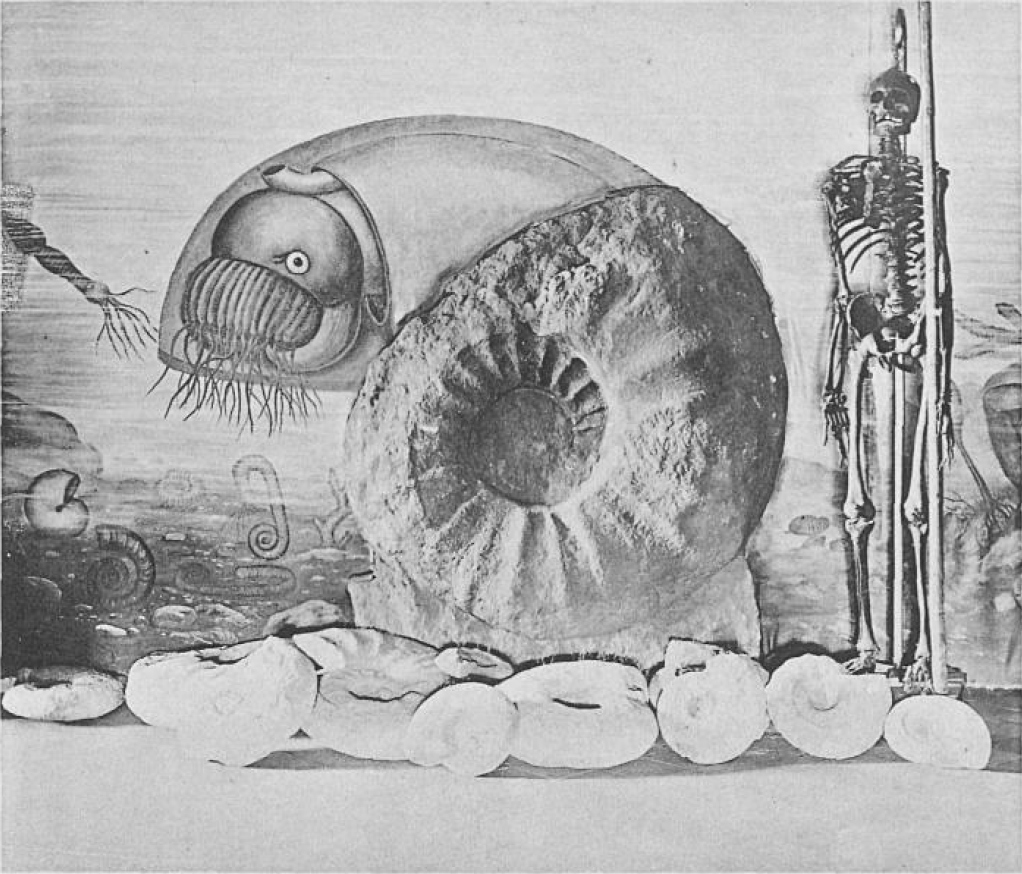
The earliest discovered fossil of P. seppenradensis, as it appeared at the Westphalian Museum of Natural History in 1895. A human skeleton provided scale, while an oil painted background reconstructed the living chamber and animal itself, together with assorted Cretaceous sealife.

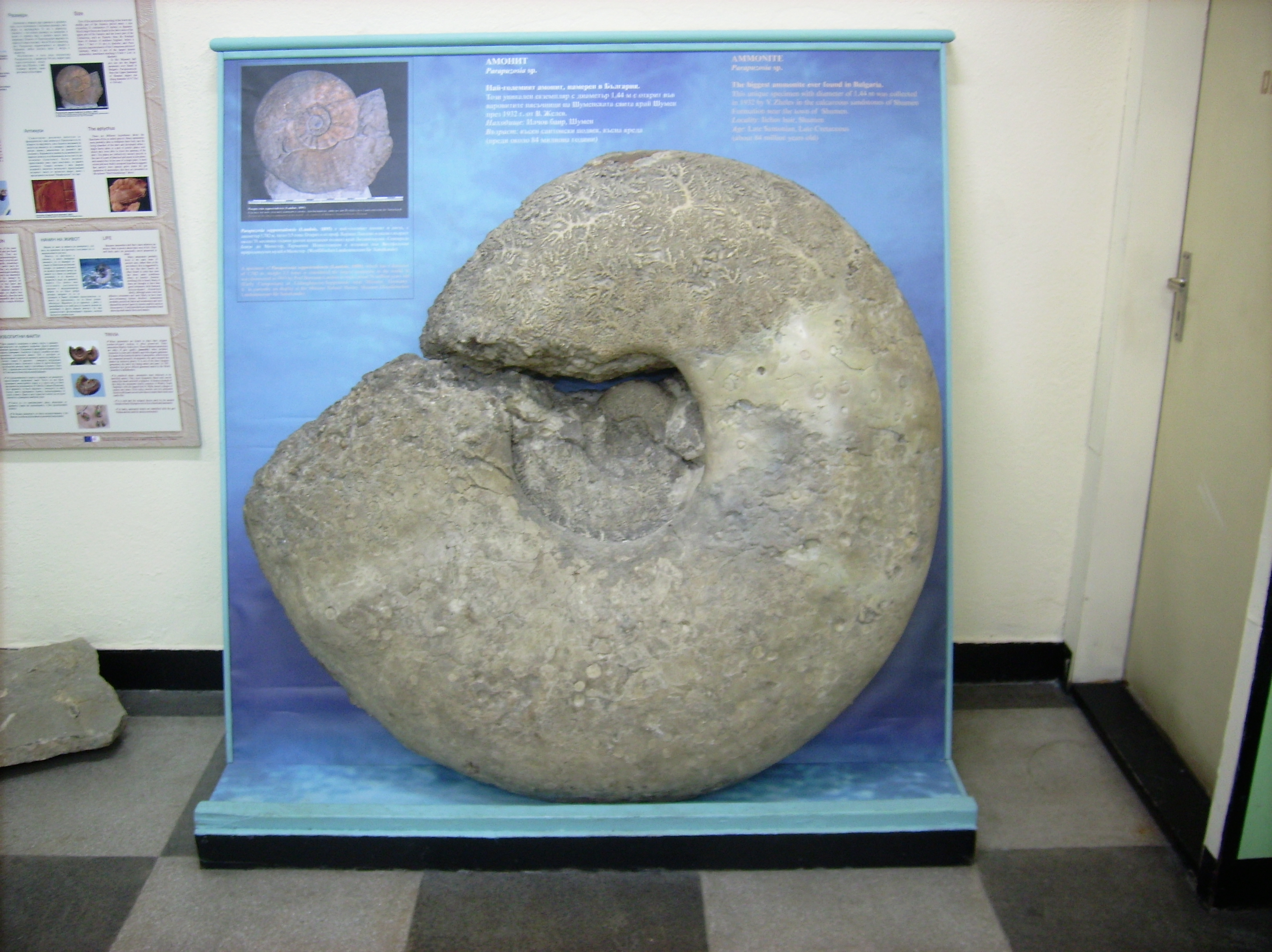
The largest ammonite ever found in Bulgaria: a 1.44 m Parapuzosia sp. collected near Shumen in 1932. It is on display at the National Museum of Natural History in Sofia.

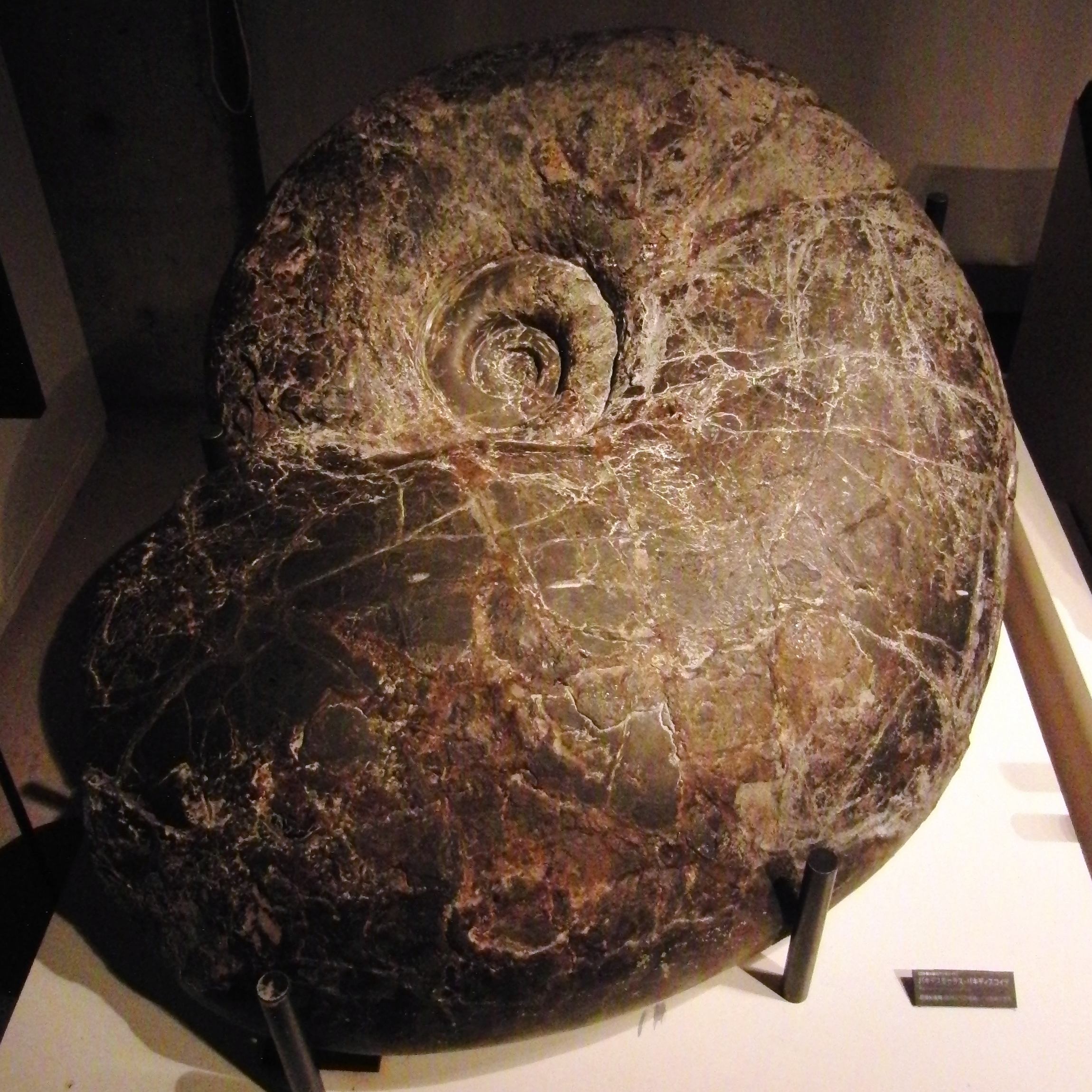
Giant fossil of Pachydesmoceras pachydiscoide from Mikasa, Hokkaido, Japan, exhibited at the National Museum of Nature and Science in Tokyo

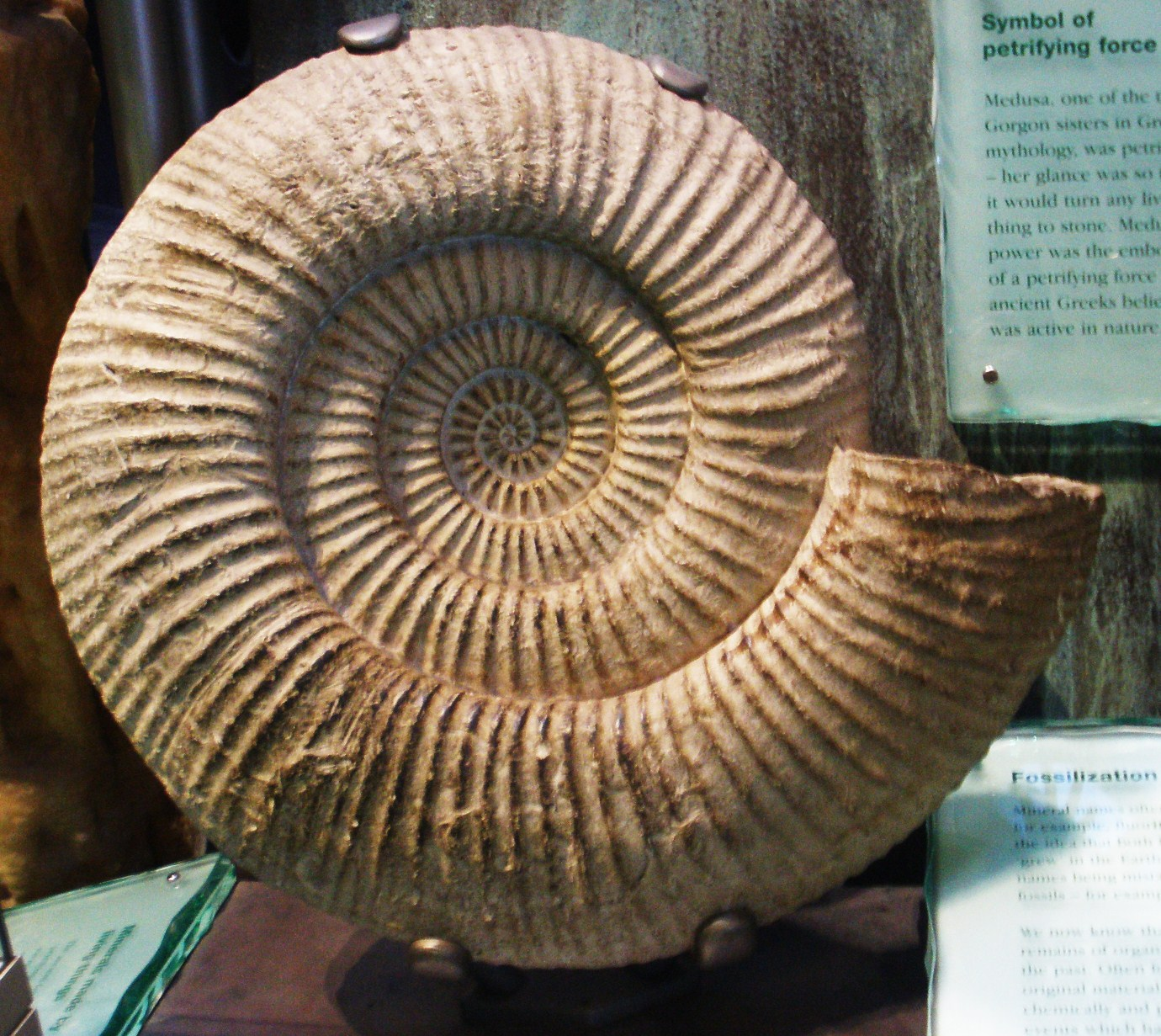
Titanites giganteus at the Natural History Museum in London

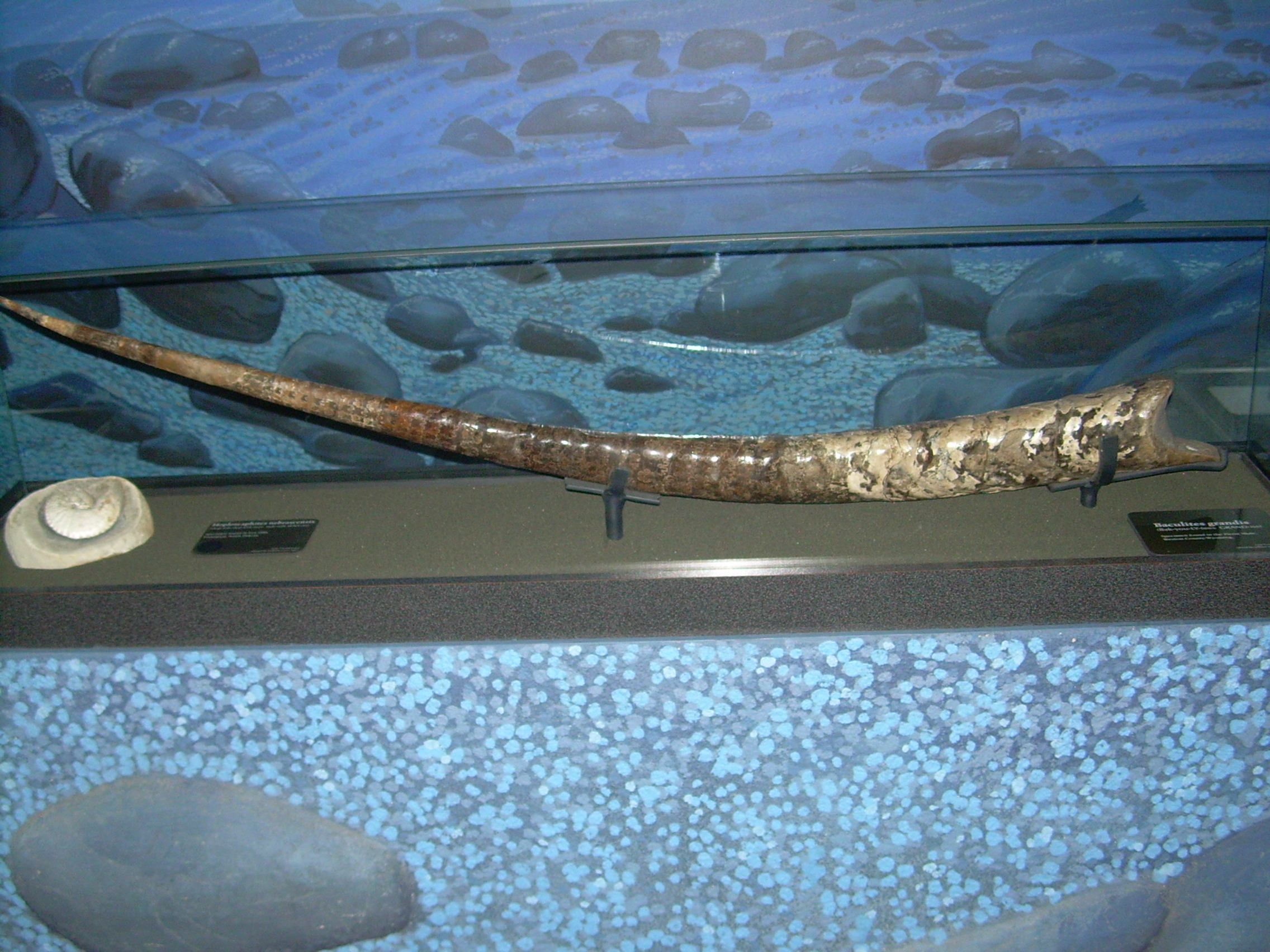
The uncoiled shell of Baculites grandis, a species of heteromorph ammonite

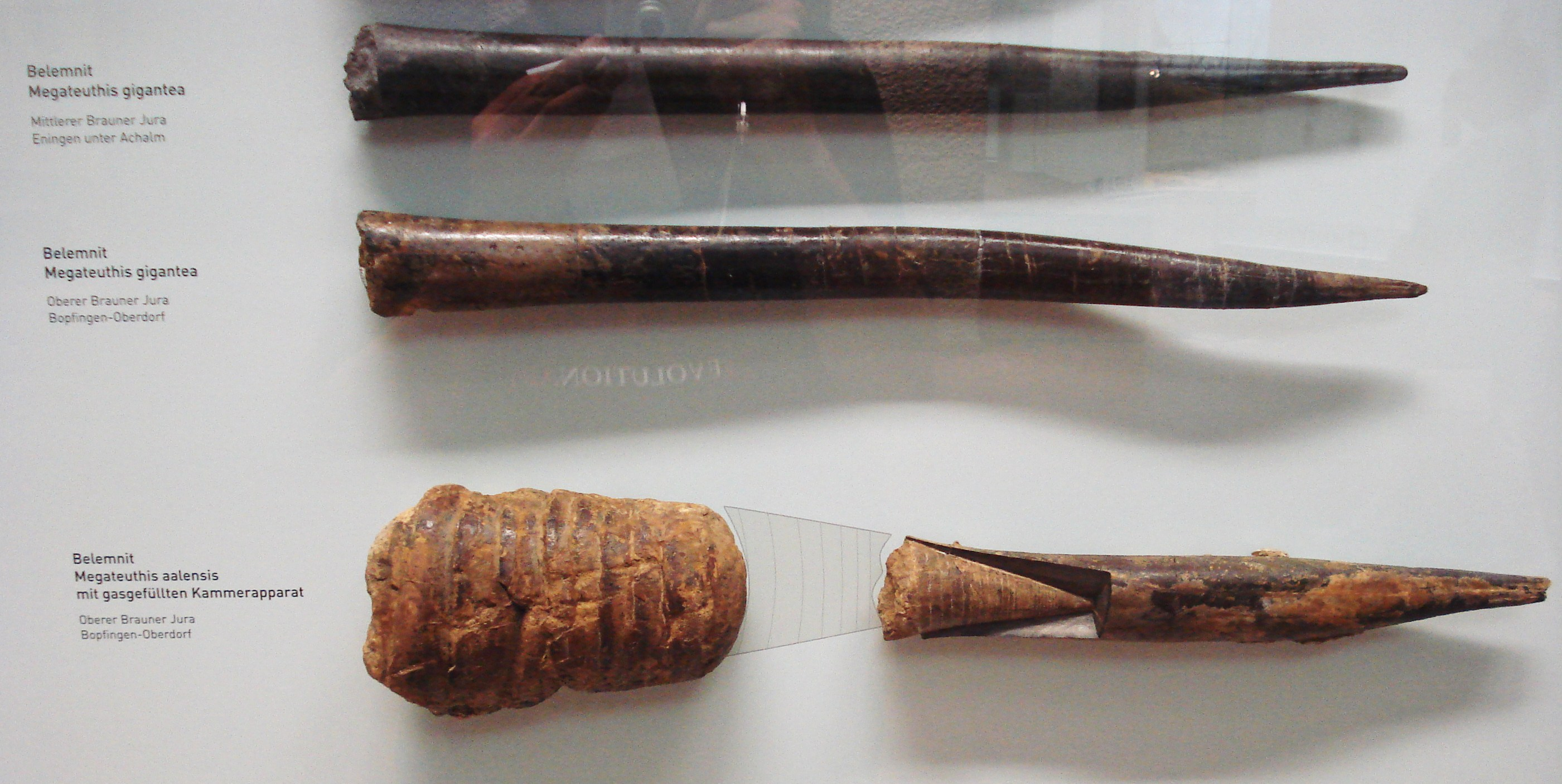
Fossilised guards of the Jurassic belemnites Megateuthis gigantea (top two) and Megateuthis aalensis

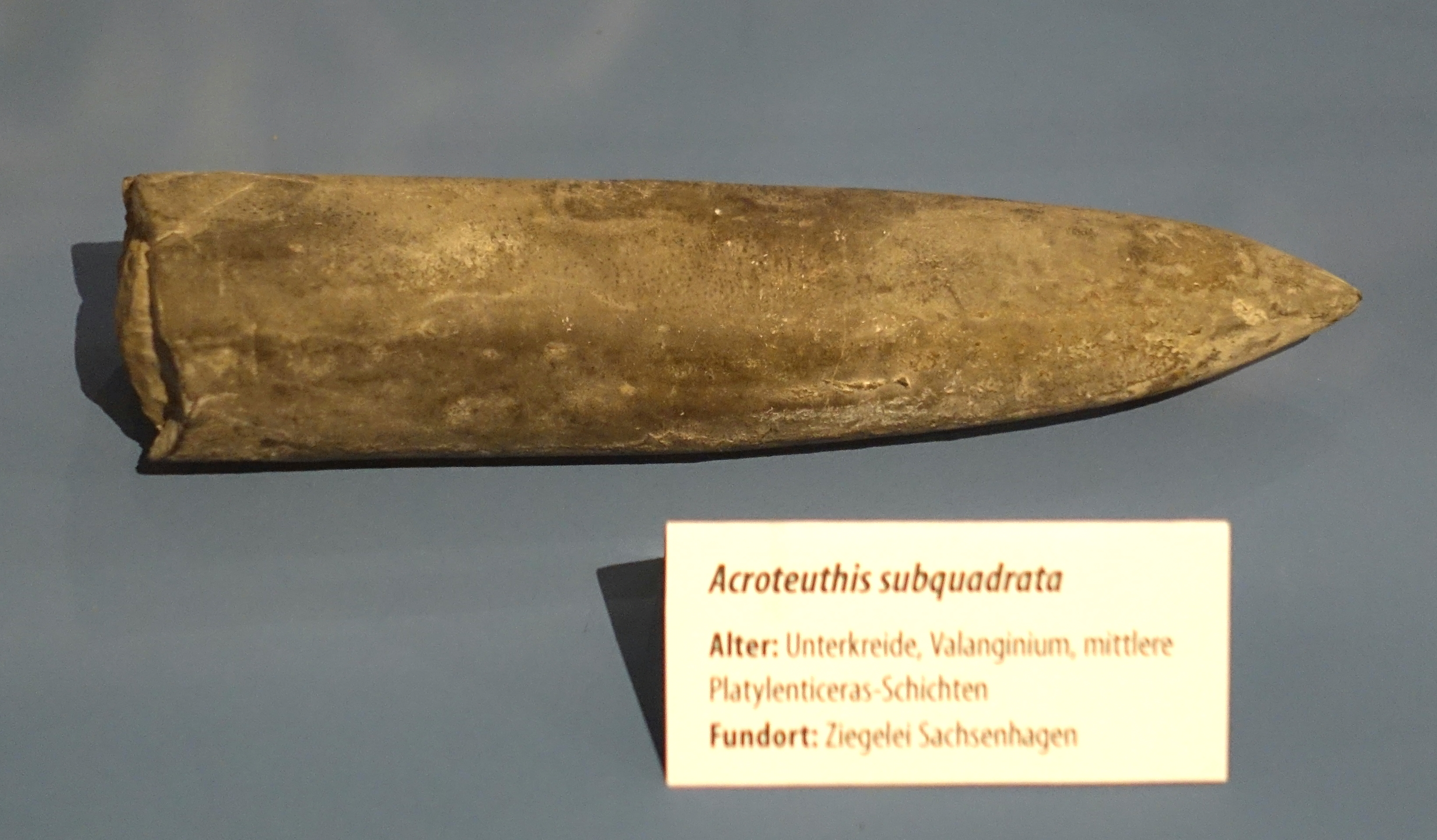
Fossilised rostrum of Acroteuthis subquadrata

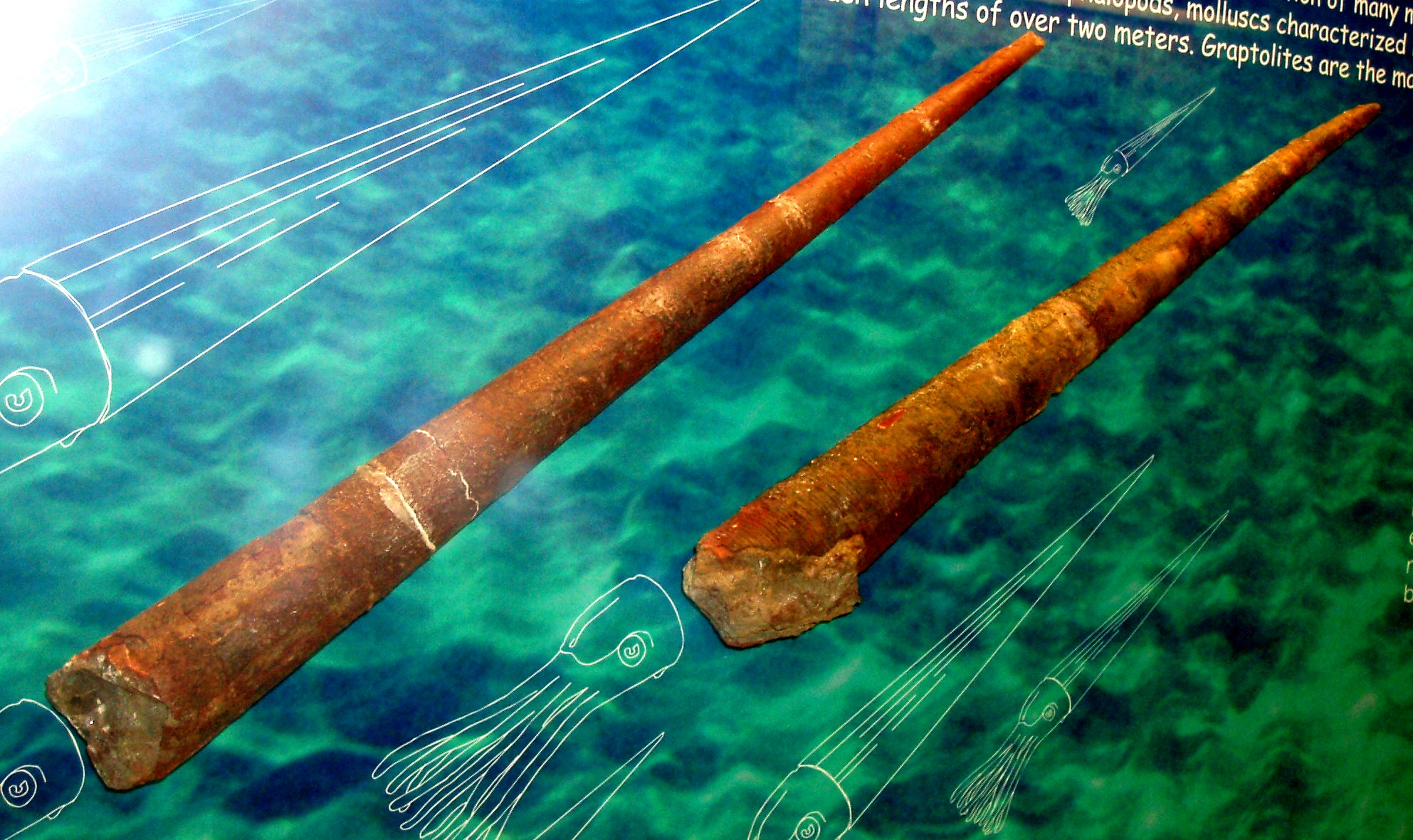
Endoceras orthocones

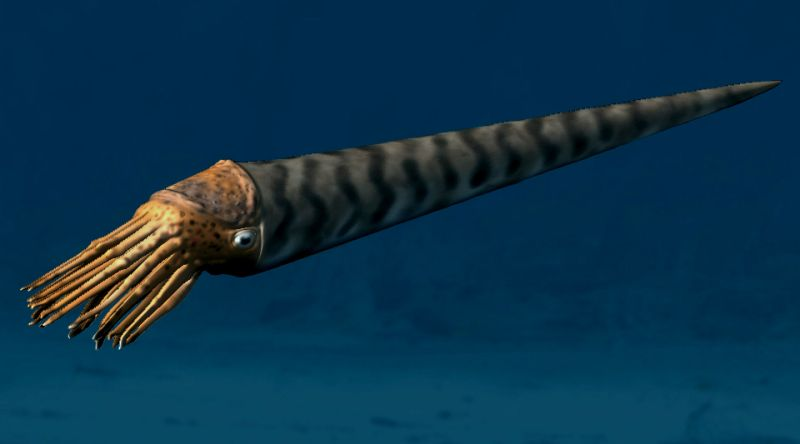
Artist's reconstruction of Orthoceras sp., an orthocerid of the Middle Ordovician

Ammonoidea (ammonoids)
Species	Maximum shell diameter (length for heteromorphs)	References	Notes
Parapuzosia seppenradensis	2–3.5 m (estimate)	Landois (1895:100); Landois (1898:27); Teichert & Kummel (1960:6); Summesberger (1979:128); Holland (1987:6); Kennedy & Kaplan (1995:21); Lewy (2002:66); frim et al. (2021)	Widely recognised as the largest ammonite specimen ever found (Payne et al., 2009:27; Grulke, 2014:124). Discovered in 1895 in a quarry in Seppenrade, Coesfeld, Germany, the original is on display at the Westfälisches Museum für Naturkunde in Münster. Estimate based on lectotype measuring 1.742 m in diameter (Kennedy & Kaplan, 1995:21) with an incomplete living chamber, assuming living chamber took up one-fourth of the outer whorl. Teichert & Kummel (1960:6) suggested an even larger shell diameter of around 3.5 m for this specimen, assuming the body chamber extended for three-fourths to one full whorl. Landois (1898:27) estimated the total live weight at 1456 kg, of which the shell would constitute 705 kg. The fossil itself weighs around 3.5 tonnes (Beer, 2015). A smaller specimen of 1.36 m was found in the same quarry some years earlier (Beer, 2015). In 1971 a portion of an ammonite possibly surpassing the Seppenrade specimen was reportedly found in a brickyard in Bottrop, western Germany (Beer, 2015). In 2021, diameter of 2 m is estimated for the largest specimen.
Parapuzosia bradyi	>1.8 m (estimate)	Larson et al. (1997:44); Lewy (2002:66)	Largest known North American ammonite. Estimate based on incomplete specimen measuring 1.37 m in diameter (missing at least half a whorl of the body chamber).
Peltoceratinae gen. et sp. indet.	1.78 m (estimate)	Poulton (1989)	Estimate based on small portion of outer whorl measuring 1.2 m along the venter and subtending a chord of 1.13 m. The estimate is based on the ultimate whorl height/diameter ratio of "Titanites" occidentalis (about 35%), and assumes a constant rate of expansion. More crude calculations give a circular diameter of 2–2.4 m (best fit of the specimen's outline to a curve yields 2.16 m estimate).
Eopachydiscus sp.	1.67 m	Grulke (2014:125)	This specimen, from the Albian Duck Creek Formation of Texas, has been exhibited at the Tucson Fossil Show and in a New York auction.
Pachydesmoceras cf. pachydiscoide	1.65 m (estimate)	Kin & Niedźwiedzki (2012:19)	Estimate based on 0.98 m diameter specimen representing an apparently complete phragmocone (previously referred to Lewesiceras peramplum or Parapuzosia). A more complete and therefore larger specimen (1.18 m diameter) consisting of a complete phragmocone and near-complete body chamber is also known (Kin & Niedźwiedzki, 2012:17).
Lytoceras taharoaense	1.5 m	Stevens (1978a:3); Stevens (1978b:2); Stevens (1979a:33); Stevens (1979b:6); Stevens (1979c:166); Stevens (1985:153); Grulke (2014:126)	Size based on essentially complete shell with only some damage to the aperture.
Mesopuzosia mobergi	<1.5 m	Kin & Niedźwiedzki (2012:19)	
Parapuzosia austeni	<1.5 m	Kin & Niedźwiedzki (2012:19)	Puzosia mayoriana is a synonym.
Moutoniceras sp.	1.47 m [heteromorph]	Grulke (2014:126)	In private collection of Wolfgang Grulke, according to whom it is likely the largest heteromorph ammonite ever found (Grulke, 2014:126). Originating from Morocco it is displayed in part of the original rock matrix with sympatric Gassendiceras heteromorphs. Its unrolled shell length would have exceeded 3 m (Grulke, 2014:126). A specimen claimed to be very slightly larger at 1.48 m was auctioned in September 2015 ([Anonymous], 2015a).
Parapuzosia bosei	1.45 m	Scott & Moore (1928:276); Lewy (2002:66)	From the Austin Chalk of the Rio Grande region, Texas. The largest known specimen was reported by Scott & Moore (1928:273) to be 4 ft 9 in (1.45 m) in diameter and "impossible to extract from its matrix". The authors found "[m]any others only slightly smaller", of which three were collected in 1928 and deposited at Texas Christian University (Scott & Moore, 1928:273–274).
Parapuzosia americana	1.37 m (estimate)	Scott & Moore (1928:276)	From the Austin Chalk of the Rio Grande region, Texas.
Corbinites occidentalis	1.37 m	Frebold (1957:66); Westermann (1966)	Originally assigned to the genus Titanites. Size based on specimen consisting of an imprint and part of the last whorl preserved as an internal mould.
Diplomoceras maximum	>1 m [heteromorph]	Olivero & Zinsmeister (1989)	
Tropaeum imperator	almost 1 m	Grulke (2014:126)	Largest ammonite known from Australia. Grulke (2014:126) writes: "No exact size is available but it could be almost 1 m across".
Belemnoidea (belemnoids)
Species	Maximum rostrum measurements	References	Notes
Megateuthis sp.	0.7 m TL (Dvms: 30 mm; Dvma: 50 mm)	Schlegelmilch (1998:1); Weis & Mariotti (2007:166); Iba et al. (2015:23–24)	Megateuthis elliptica is "the longest belemnite species known", with rostra from the Humphriesianum Zone in Rumelange and Luxembourg reaching 60–70 cm (Weis & Mariotti, 2007:166). The whole animal is estimated to have been 3–5 m long (Eyden, 2003a). Fuchs and Stinnesbeck (2021) estimated total mantle length of 2.22 m.
Belemnitina gen. et sp. indet.	? TL (Dvms: 30 mm; Dvma: ?)	Iba et al. (2015:23)	Known from a single incomplete rostrum (TCSM-J1-0001) from the Pliensbachian Teradani Formation in Teradani, Toyama Prefecture, Japan. The specimen is missing the apical and alveolar regions and comprises only the middle (stem) region of the rostrum. It measures 45 mm in total length by 30 mm and 25 mm across at the anterior and posterior ends, respectively. Iba et al. (2015:23) wrote: "In the Belemnitina, the diameter of the alveolar region is generally larger than those of the apical and stem regions. Thus maximum rostrum diameter of the Teradani specimen is estimated to reach much more than 30 mm."
Acroteuthis sp.	? TL (Dvms: 39 mm; Dvma: 42 mm)	Iba et al. (2015:23)	One of "the largest belemnites ever observed", with a rostrum comparable to that of the indeterminate belemnitinid from Teradani.
Pachyteuthis sp.	? TL (Dvms: 39 mm; Dvma: 40 mm)	Iba et al. (2015:23)	One of "the largest belemnites ever observed", with a rostrum comparable to that of the indeterminate belemnitinid from Teradani.
Belemnitina gen. et sp. indet.	? TL (Dvms: ?; Dvma: >33 mm)	Iba et al. (2015:23)	From the Hettangian Niranohama Formation of northeastern Japan. One of "the largest belemnites ever observed", with a rostrum comparable to but likely slightly smaller than that of the indeterminate belemnitinid from Teradani.
Nautiloidea (nautiloids)
Species	Maximum shell length	References	Notes
Endoceras giganteum	5.733 m (estimate)	Klug et al. (2015:270)	Estimate based on incomplete 3-metre-long shell deposited at the Museum of Comparative Zoology, Harvard University. Teichert & Kummel (1960:5) assumed length of 8 m based on body chamber-to-phragmocone ratio of 1:2 and wrote that this was likely "the largest fragment of an endoceroid cephalopod on display anywhere in the world". However, Klug et al. (2015:270) estimated the total length of the complete shell at 5.733 m, with a volume of 158.6 litres. From the Katian of New York (Klug et al., 2015:270). The published literature includes unconfirmed reports of even larger endocerids. Frey (1995) mentioned length of 6 m as maximum size for genus Cameroceras, although this author support theory that some large specimens of Endoceras belong to Cameroceras instead.
Endoceras proteiforme	3.0–4.6 m (10–15 ft)	Clarke (1897:778); Teichert & Kummel (1960:1)	Size based on "entire shells" (Clarke, 1897:778).
Rayonnoceras solidiforme	2.8 m (estimate)	Klug et al. (2015:270)	From the Visean of Arkansas. Shell volume estimated at 62.5 litres.
Deiroceras hollardi	2.6 m (estimate)	Klug et al. (2015:270)	From the early Emsian of "Jebel Mdouar". Shell volume estimated at 68.3 litres.
Cameroceras turrisoides	c. 2 m (estimate)	Kröger & Ebbestad (2014)	From the Katian of Sweden. Estimated after maximum diameter (165 mm).
Actinocerida gen. et sp. indet.	1.911 m (estimate)	Klug et al. (2015:270)	From the Llandovery of Gotland. Shell volume estimated at 8.9 litres.
Orthocerida gen. et sp. indet.	1.783 m (estimate)	Klug et al. (2015:270)	From the Ludlow of Gotland. Shell volume estimated at 4.1 litres.
Ormoceras TUG 1308-1	1.72 m (estimate)	Klug et al. (2015:270)	From the Sandbian of Estonia. Shell volume estimated at 2.7 litres.
Ormoceras giganteum MB.C.11940	1.71 m (estimate)	Klug et al. (2015:270)	From the Darriwilian. Shell volume estimated at 2.7 litres.
Lambeoceras lambii	1.405 m (estimate)	Leith (1942:130); Teichert & Kummel (1960:4)	Estimate based on incomplete 1.155 m long shell.
Orthoceras regarium	1.39 m (estimate)	Klug et al. (2015:270)	From the Wenlock of Joachimsthal. (Note: There are two places which bear or have borne the name Joachimsthal: Jáchymov, Czech Republic and Joachimsthal, Brandenburg, Germany. The citation quotes an unpublished report, and it is unclear which one it is referring to. If the report is later than 1945, when the official name of the Czech town was changed, it is most likely the place in Germany.) Shell volume estimated at 5.1 litres.
Temperoceras aequinudum	1.333 m (estimate)	Klug et al. (2015:270)	From the Lochkovian of "Ouidane Chebbi". Shell volume estimated at 9.2 litres.
Zeravshanoceras priscum	1.299 m (estimate)	Klug et al. (2015:270)	From the Eifelian. Shell volume estimated at 1.6 litres.
Ordogeisonoceras amplicameratum	>1.25 m	Frey (1995:40)	Shell diameter up to 10.5 cm. Originally described as Orthoceras amplicameratum. Orthoceras ludlowense is considered a synonym.
Cameroceras hennepini	<1.2 m (4 ft) (estimate)	Clarke (1897:779)	Size estimate based on "the most complete of the fragments which represent it".
Actinoceras vaughanianum	1.198 m (estimate)	Klug et al. (2015:270)	From the Serpukhovian of Oklahoma. Shell volume estimated at 8.7 litres.
Polygrammoceras? cf. P. sp. A	1.13 m (estimate)	Frey (1995:69)	Estimate based on a "single, very large fragment of a phragmocone". Shell diameter to 9.0 cm.
Plagiostomoceras sp.	1.1 m (estimate)	Klug et al. (2015:270)	From the Givetian of Onondaga, New York. Shell volume estimated at 0.0052 litres.
Endoceras decorahense	1.06 m (estimate; phragmocone only)	Miller & Kummel (1944); Teichert & Kummel (1960:2)	Size estimate based on two portions of an internal mould of the phragmocone, measuring 62.5 cm and 32 cm, with an estimated missing middle section of 11.5 cm.
Proterovaginoceras incognitum	1 m (estimate)	Klug et al. (2015:270)	From the Dapingian of Jämtland, Sweden. Shell volume estimated at 0.8 litres.
Teuthida (squids)
Species	Maximum mantle length	References	Notes
Yezoteuthis giganteus	≈1.7 m (estimate)	Tanabe et al. (2006:142)	Size estimate based on preserved upper jaw measuring 97.0 mm in maximum length, similar to that of the largest giant squid (Architeuthis dux). Tanabe et al. (2006:143) wrote that this species "appears to be the largest fossil coleoid ever described".
Octopodiformes
Species	Maximum mantle length	References	Notes
Nanaimoteuthis haggarti	1.58-4.43 m (estimate)	Ikegamiet al. (2026)	Estimated from lower jaw, with proportions of modern members in the order Cirrata. Estimated total length is around 6.6-18.6 m. Some researchers question about upper estimates.
Enchoteuthis melanae	up to 2 m (estimate)	Eyden (2003b); Fuchs et al. (2020)	Total length estimated to be up to 3 m. Tusoteuthis longa is likely to be invalid, and largest specimen should belongs to E. melanae.
Nanaimoteuthis jeletzkyi	0.67-1.84 m (estimate)	Ikegamiet al. (2026)	Estimated from lower jaw, with proportions of modern members in the order Cirrata. Estimated total length is around 2.8-7.7 m.
Leptotheuthis	1.3 m (gladius length)	Fuchs and Stinnesbeck (2021)	Reference spells "Leptotheuthis".
Eromangateuthis soniae	1.2 m (gladius length)	Fuchs (2019)	Size based on gladius from Queensland, Australia. A second gladius measuring more than a metre and showing possible evidence of predation by Kronosaurus is also known (Eyden, 2003b).
Trachyteuthis	0.8 m (gladius length)	Fuchs and Stinnesbeck (2021)	Size given for Early Cretaceous species.
Sister group of Decapodiformes
Species	Maximum mantle length	References	Notes
Longibelus matsumotoi (?)	91.1-98.9 cm (estimate)	Tanabe and Misaki (2023)	Estimated from rostral length of lower jaw, with proportion of Spirula, giant squid and colossal squid.

== Anatomical superlatives ==
=== Eyes ===
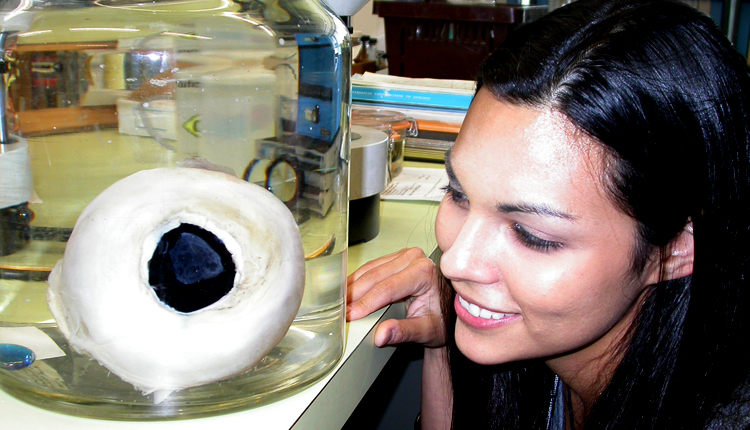
Preserved giant squid eye

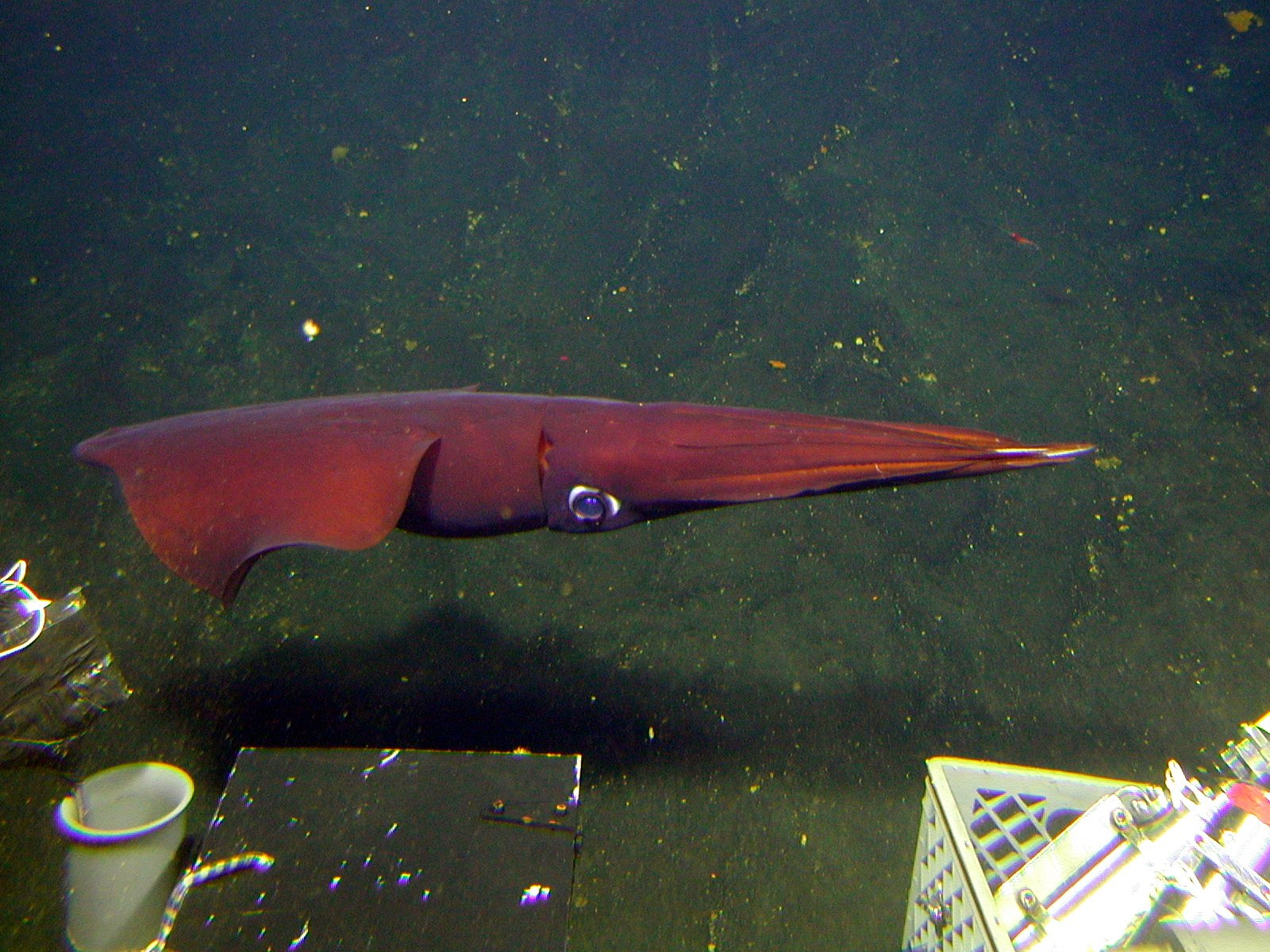
Gonatus sp. swimming past a submersible during a dive to the Kermadec Arc off New Zealand. Gonatids such as this have proportionately slightly larger eyes than do giant squid.

The giant and colossal squids have the largest recorded eyes of any living animal, with a maximum diameter of at least 27 cm (11 in) and a 9 cm (3.5 in) pupil. This is three times the size of the largest fish eyes—up to 90 mm (3.5 in) in swordfish—and more than twice the diameter of the largest whale eyes—up to 109 mm (4.3 in), 61 mm (2.4 in), and 55 mm (2.2 in) in blue, humpback, and sperm whales, respectively—which are the largest among vertebrates. A large colossal squid caught in 2014 and dissected at the Museum of New Zealand Te Papa Tongarewa had eyes some 35–37 cm (14–15 in) across. There are unconfirmed reports from the 19th century of giant squid eyes up to 40 cm (1.3 ft) across. Only the extinct ichthyosaurs are known to have approached these dimensions, with some species having eyes up to 35 cm (14 in) in diameter.

Despite their size, the eyes of giant and colossal squids do not appear to be disproportionately large; they do not deviate significantly from the allometric relationship seen across other squid species. Sepiolids are noted for having exceptionally large eyes, which are much bigger relative to their mantle length than those of the giant squid; the same is true of Histioteuthis species. Gonatids and the loliginids Loligo and Lolliguncula also have proportionately somewhat larger eyes than Architeuthis. Some sources state that the vampire squid (Vampyroteuthis infernalis) has the largest eyes of any animal relative to its size, with a 15 cm (5.9 in) specimen having eyes around 2.5 cm (0.98 in) in diameter.

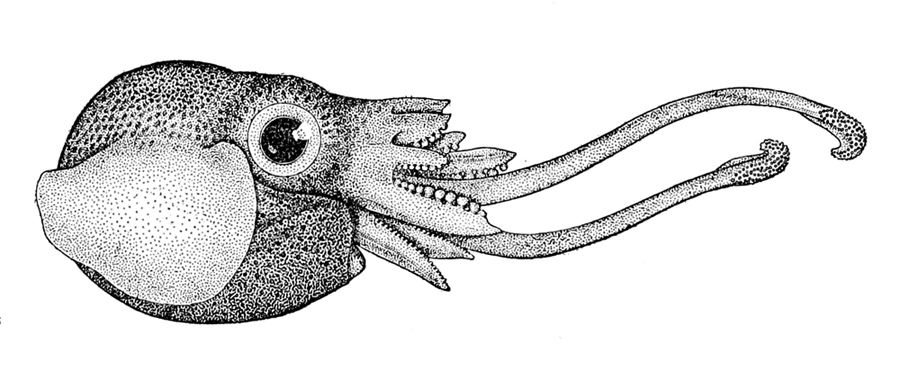
Iridoteuthis iris is an extreme example of a sepiolid with disproportionately large eyes

There is some debate in the scientific community as to the evolutionary reason behind the extremely large eyes of giant and colossal squids. Nilsson et al. (2012) and Nilsson et al. (2013) argue that it is an anti-predator adaptation for enhanced detection of sperm whales, with the squids picking up plankton bioluminescence triggered by moving whales, perhaps from distances exceeding 120 m (390 ft). Schmitz et al. (2013a) and Schmitz et al. (2013b) contend that their eyes are so large due to a phylogenetically conserved developmental pattern that governs the relative dimensions of squids and their eyes, and that any fitness benefits their size may confer in terms of predator avoidance are the result of exaptation ("pre-adaptation").

=== Neurons ===
Squid giant axons can exceed 1 mm (0.039 in) in diameter: 100 to 1000 times the thickness of mammalian axons. The axons of the Humboldt squid (Dosidicus gigas) are exceptional in that they can reach a diameter of as much as 1.5 mm (0.059 in), and those of Loligo forbesii can also exceed 1 mm. Such was the importance of Humboldt squid to electrophysiology research that when the animals migrated out of reach of Chilean fishermen in the 1970s "it led to the demise of a world-class electrophysiology laboratory" based there. Squid giant axon diameters do not necessarily correlate with overall body size; those of the giant squid (Architeuthis dux) are only 0.137–0.21 mm (0.0054–0.0083 in) thick.

Diagram showing the three major elements (red, green, and yellow) of the squid giant neuronal system. The arrows indicate the direction of transmission from the head ganglion towards the mantle. The funnel (light blue) is the site of rapid water expulsion following mantle contraction.

The squid giant synapse is the largest chemical junction in nature. It lies in the stellate ganglion on each side of the midline, at the posterior wall of the squid's muscular mantle. Activation of this synapse triggers a synchronous contraction of the mantle musculature, causing the forceful ejection of a jet of water from the mantle. This water propulsion allows the squid to move rapidly through the water and, in the case of the so-called 'flying squids', even to jump through the surface of the water (breaking the air–water barrier) to escape predators. Many essential elements of how all chemical synapses function were first discovered by studying the squid giant synapse.

=== Photophores ===
Taningia danae, a very large octopoteuthid squid, possesses "lemon-sized" yellow photophores at the tips of two of its arms, which are the largest known light-emitting organs in the animal kingdom. Video footage shot in 2005 in deep water off Japan shows T. danae emitting blinding flashes of light from these photophores as it attacks its prey. A pair of muscular lids surrounds each photophore and it is the withdrawal of these lids that produces the flashes. A large individual filmed from a remote submersible off Hawaii in 2015 can clearly be seen opening the lids to reveal its photophores. It is believed that this highly manoeuvrable squid uses bright flashes to disorientate potential prey. The flashes may also serve to illuminate prey for easier capture or play a role in courtship and/or territorial displays.

=== Reproductive organs ===
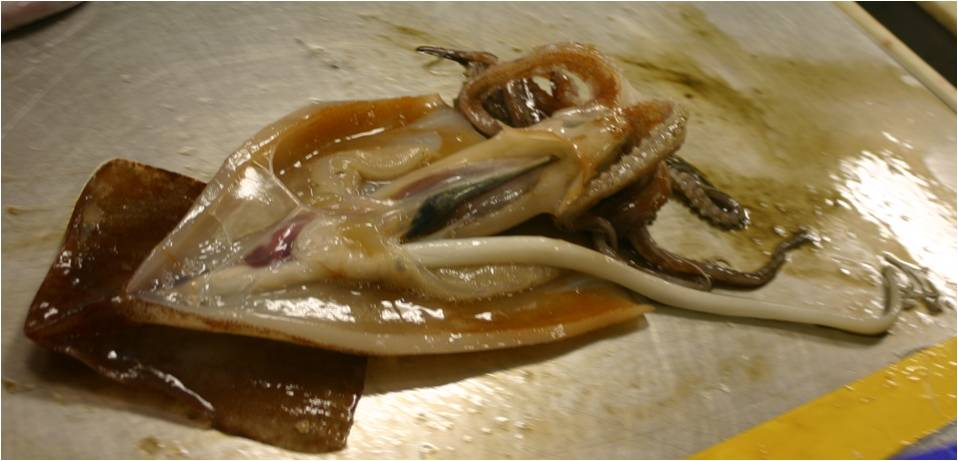
A dissected male specimen of Onykia ingens, showing an erect 67 cm (2.20 ft) penis approximating the combined length of the mantle, head, and arms

Extreme penis elongation has been observed in the deep water squid Onykia ingens. When erect, the penis may be as long as the mantle, head, and arms combined. As such, deep water squids have the greatest known penis length relative to body size of all mobile animals, second in the entire animal kingdom only to certain sessile barnacles.

== See also ==
- Deep-sea gigantism
- Gigantic octopus
- Largest body parts
- Largest organisms
- Largest prehistoric organisms
- List of colossal squid specimens and sightings
- List of giant squid specimens and sightings
- Smallest organisms
