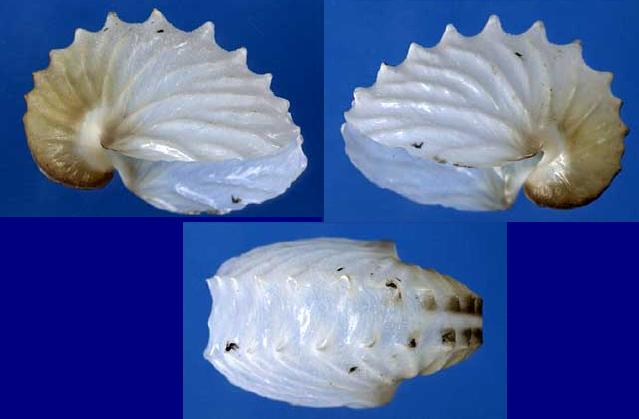
- Argonauta pacifica eggcase, Baja California.

Scientific classification
- Kingdom: Animalia
- Phylum: Mollusca
- Class: Cephalopoda
- Order: Octopoda
- Family: Argonautidae
- Genus: Argonauta
- Species: A. pacifica

Binomial name
- Argonauta pacifica Dall, 1871

Synonyms
- Argonauta pacifica nom. nud. Dall, 1869

= Argonauta pacifica =

Pacific argonaut

Species of mollusc

Argonauta pacifica, also known as the Pacific argonaut, is a species of pelagic octopus. The female of the species, like all argonauts, creates a paper-thin eggcase that coils around the octopus much like the way a nautilus lives in its shell (hence the name paper nautilus). The shell is usually approximately 150 mm in length, although it can exceed 200 mm in exceptional specimens; the world record size is 220.0 mm.

A. pacifica seems to have a relatively limited distribution, being confined to the waters surrounding western Mexico, and in particular the Gulf of California. For this reason, it is considered one of the rarest of the Argonauta species, along with A. cornuta and A. nouryi.

The taxonomic status of this species questionable. Further research is needed to determine whether it is a valid species or a synonym of another taxon.

The type specimen of A. pacifica was collected off the coast of California and is deposited at the National Museum of Natural History in Washington, D.C.
