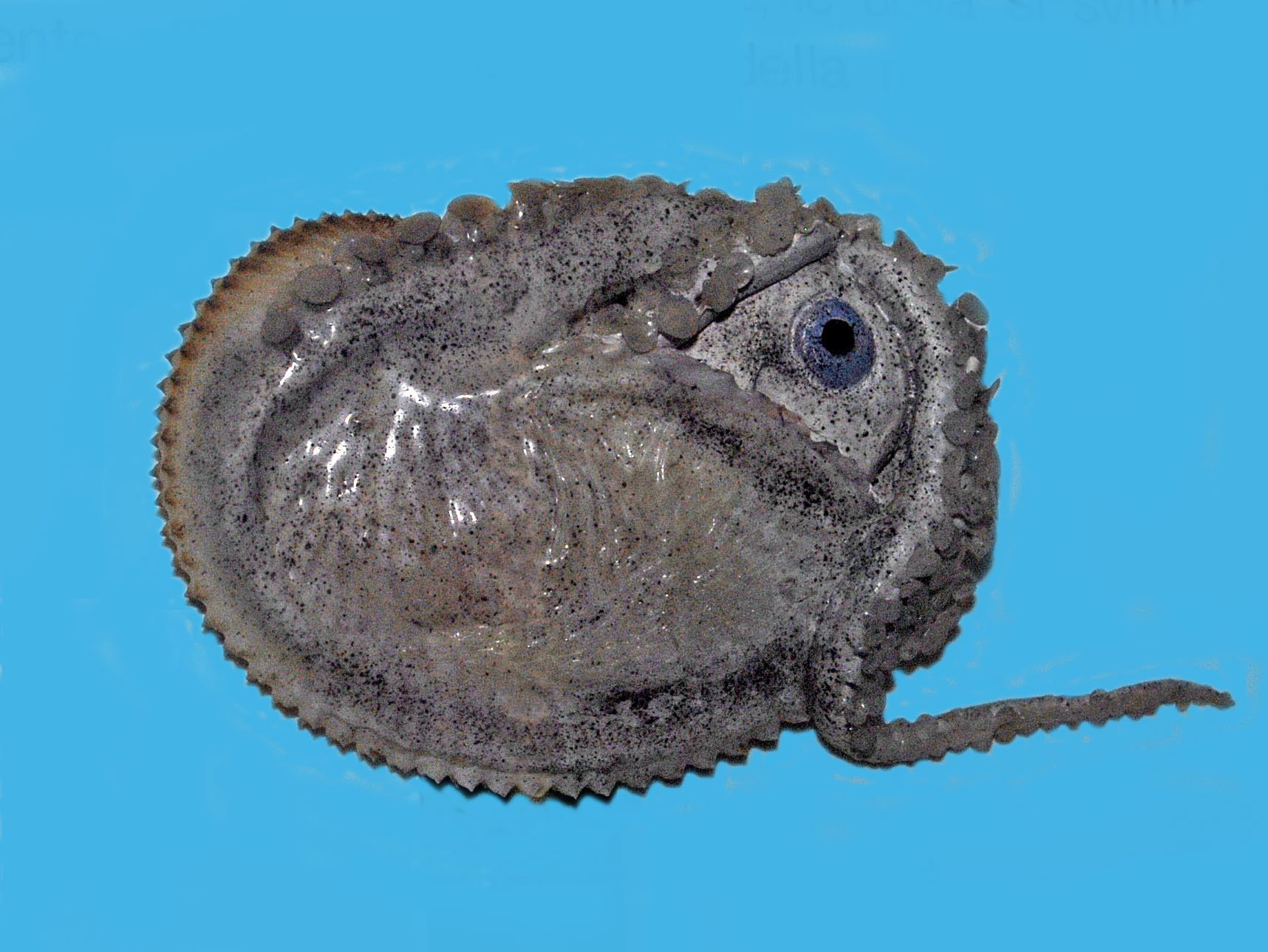
- Argonauta argo inside its shell
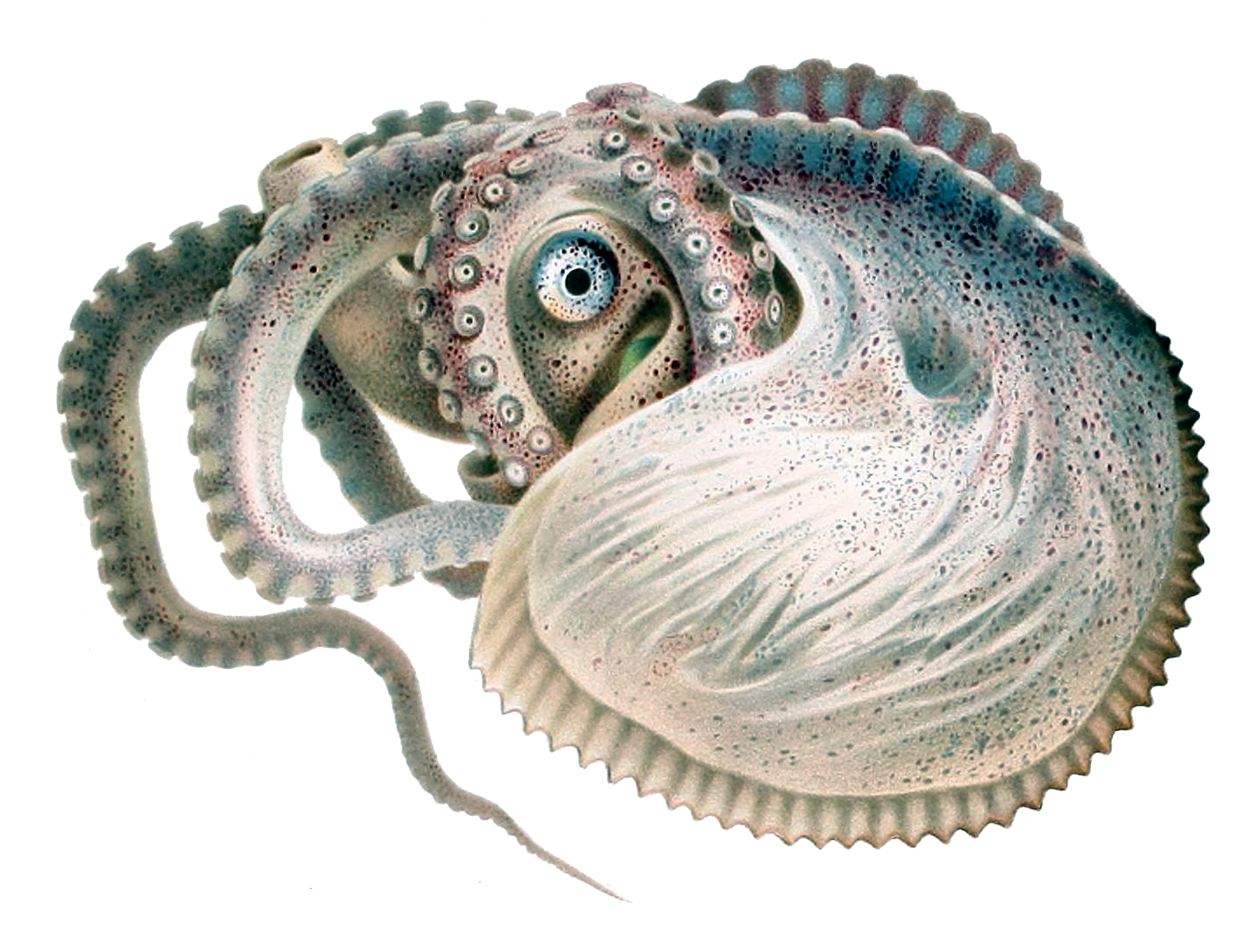
- Illustration from I Cefalopodi viventi nel Golfo di Napoli (1896)

Conservation status
- Least Concern (IUCN 3.1)

Scientific classification
- Kingdom: Animalia
- Phylum: Mollusca
- Class: Cephalopoda
- Order: Octopoda
- Family: Argonautidae
- Genus: Argonauta
- Species: A. argo

Binomial name
- Argonauta argo Linnaeus, 1758

Synonyms
- List: Argonauta papyracea Röding, 1798; Argonauta grandiformis Perry, 1811; ?Argonauta striata Perry, 1811; Ocythoe antiquorum Leach, 1817; Trichocephalus acetabularis Chiaie, 1827 in 1823-1831; ?Todarus argo nom. nud. Rafinesque, 1840; Argonauta minor Risso, 1854; Argonauta naviformis Conrad, 1854; Argonauta papyria Conrad, 1854; ?Argonauta argo f. agglutinans Von Martens, 1867; ?Argonauta argo f. aurita Von Martens, 1867; ?Argonauta argo f. mutica Von Martens, 1867; ?Argonauta argo f. obtusangula Von Martens, 1867; Argonauta bulleri Kirk, 1886; ?Argonauta argo var. americana Dall, 1889; Argonauta cygnus Monterosato, 1889; Argonauta ferussaci Monterosato, 1914; Argonauta argo mediterranea Monterosato, 1914; ?Argonauta monterosatoi Coen in Monterosato, 1914; ?Argonauta monterosatoi Coen, 1914; ?Argonauta monterosatoi Coen, 1915; Argonauta sebae Valenciennes in Monterosato, 1914

= Argonauta argo =

Greater argonaut

Species of cephalopod known as the greater argonaut

Argonauta argo, also known as the greater argonaut, is a species of pelagic octopus belonging to the genus Argonauta. In some parts of Guangdong, China, this species is locally known as “白海马巢” While the name literally translates as "white sea-horse's nest", the term "sea-horse" in regional Sinitic languages actually refers to sand crabs (such as ghost crabs) rather than the animal commonly known as a seahorse, and bears no relation to horses. In Taizhou, local elderly speakers refer to its shell as "sea-horse shell", while the soft body is called "octopus".

A. argo was the first argonaut species to be described and is consequently the type species of the genus. The type specimen of A. argo was collected in the Mediterranean Sea and is deposited at the Linnean Society of London.

== Description ==
A. argo is the largest species in the genus and also produces the largest eggcase. Live animals have a characteristic blue sheen on the first arm pair and around the eyes. The eggcase is characterised by two rows of small, sharp tubercles running along a narrow keel, smooth ribs across the walls of the shell, and a thickening along the shell aperture, which forms distinct protrusions or 'horns' on either side. Argonauta cygnus Monterosato, 1889 was described based on a shell which lacked these protrusions, although it is now considered a junior synonym of A. argo. The greatest recorded size of an A. argo eggcase is 300 mm.

A damaged beak of a female A. argo (ML = 40.0 mm; caught at 20°56′N 175°33′W), measuring 4.3 mm in hood length and 7.8 mm in crest length, is mentioned in A Handbook for the Identification of Cephalopod Beaks.

== Distribution and habitat ==
A. argo is cosmopolitan, occurring in tropical and subtropical waters worldwide. A dwarf form exists in the Mediterranean Sea, which was described as Argonauta argo mediterranea Monterosato, 1914, although this taxon is now regarded as invalid.

== Biology ==
The female of the species, like all argonauts, creates a paper-thin eggcase that coils around the octopus much like the way a nautilus lives in its shell, hence the name paper nautilus.

A. argo is thought to feed primarily on pelagic molluscs. The species is preyed on by numerous predators. It has been reported in the stomach contents of Alepisaurus ferox from the south-western Pacific.

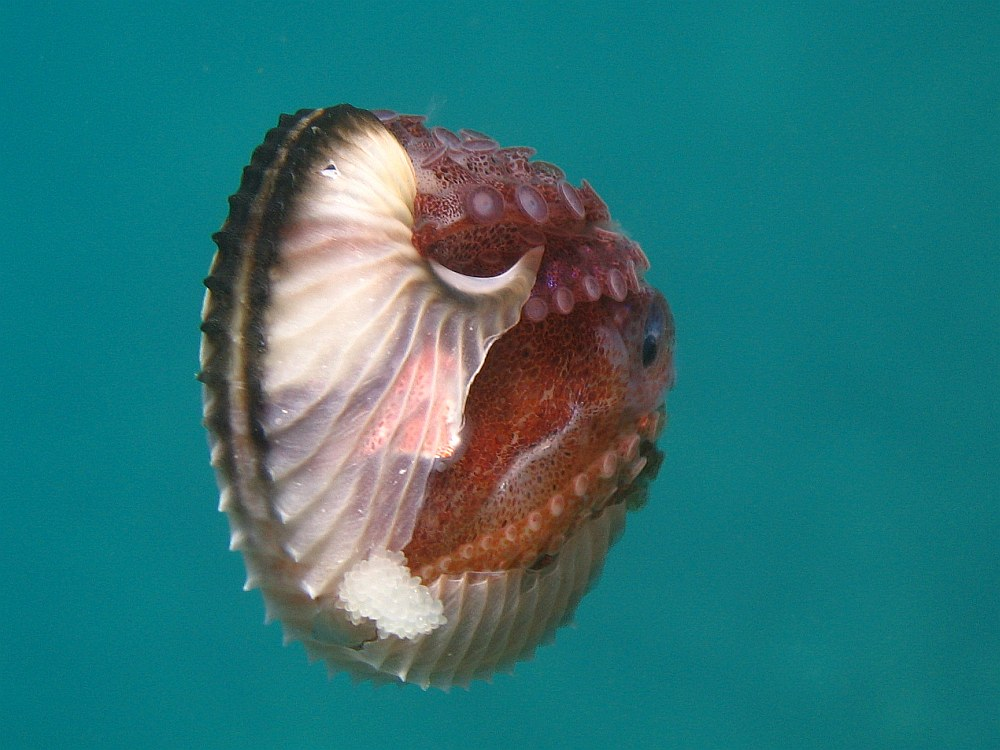
Female with damaged eggcase and eggs

Males of this species reach sexual maturity at a mantle length (ML) of 8 mm. Females mature at about double the size of Argonauta bottgeri and Argonauta hians. They begin to secrete an eggcase at 6.5–7.0 mm ML. Eggs are usually laid when females reach 14–15 mm ML, although the size at which this takes place differs across the animal's range. A small A. argo residing in an 88 mm long eggcase was estimated to be carrying 48,800 embryos. Females grow to 100 mm ML, while males do not exceed 20 mm ML.

In the open ocean, A. argo has been observed attached to jellyfish. This behaviour has been known for a long time, although little was understood about the relationship prior to the work of Heeger et al. in 1992. In "Predation on jellyfish by the cephalopod Argonauta argo", Heeger et al. describe their observations of a female A. argo found atop a host jellyfish. The argonaut was seen holding on to the aboral (exumbrellar) surface of the jellyfish using its lateral and ventral arms. The authors found that about half of the animal's aboral surface was damaged and large pieces of mesoglea were missing, presumably removed by the argonaut. Additionally, two holes, apparently bite marks, were found in the center of this area with channels leading from these holes into the gastral cavity of the jellyfish. The argonaut presumably used these channels to suck food particles from the gastral cavity. Heeger et al. suggested that "the association provided shelter or camouflage for the argonaut".

Observations of captive A. argo females suggest that the expanded webs of the dorsal arms may aid the animal in feeding. Mark Norman mentions, "when food was touched against the spread webs, an arm shot out of the shell in a sweeping action, grabbing the prey". Argonauts are not thought to actively hunt, but employ this method to catch animals that bump into them in the open ocean.

A. argo is occasionally involved in mass strandings along the South African and southern Australian coastlines. The strandings are seasonal and generally occur between April and August, towards the end of the animals' spawning season.

== Culture ==
In Japanese, this species is called "Aoi-gai" (kanji: 葵貝, Katakana: アオイガイ), which means "Shell of Aoi" (not Malva but Asarum caulescens). Japanese have compared two eggcases of argonauts lapped each other to a leaf of Asarum caulescens. Another name is "Kaidako" (kanji: 貝蛸 or 貝鮹, Katakana: カイダコ), which means "Shell Octopus".

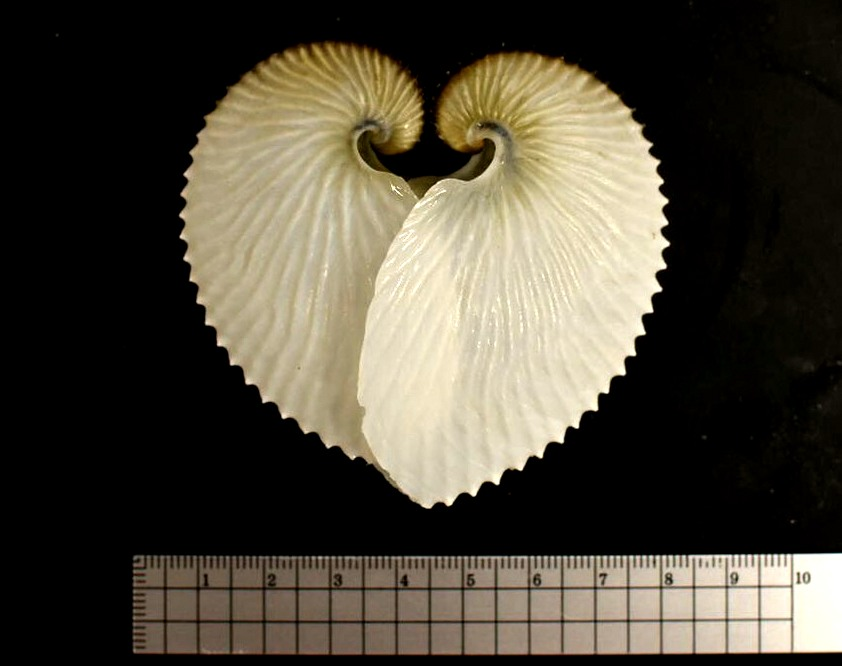
The symbol of Aoi leaf made of two argonaut shells.

Japanese Crest "Futaba Aoi" (二葉葵).

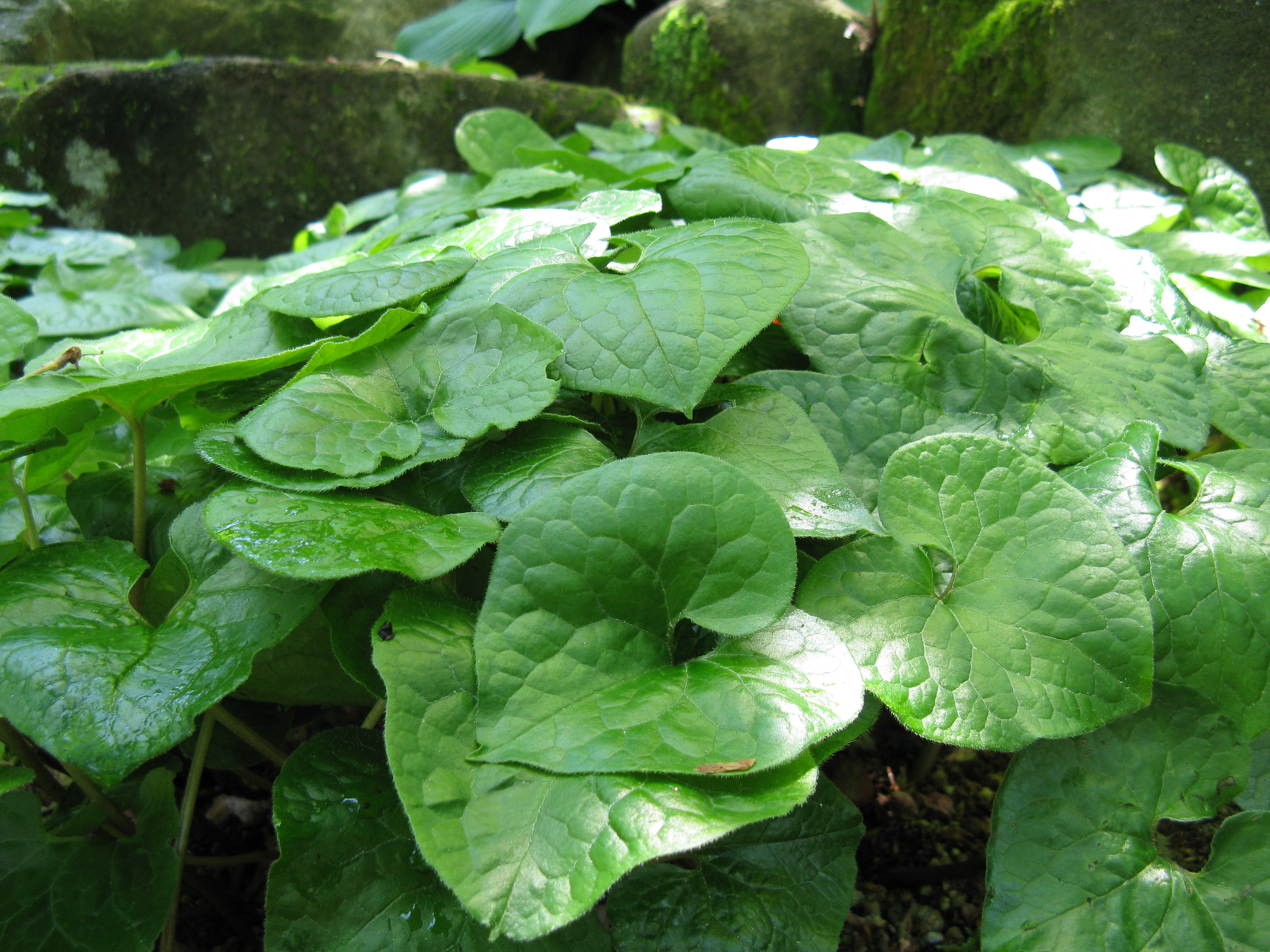
Asarum caulescens (フタバアオイ).

== Gallery ==
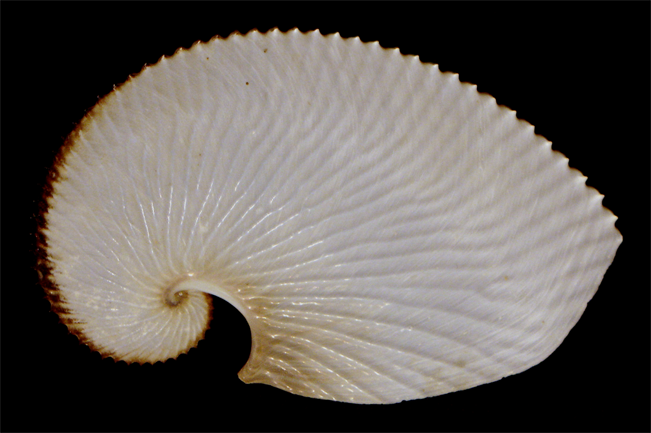
Eggcase of A. argo

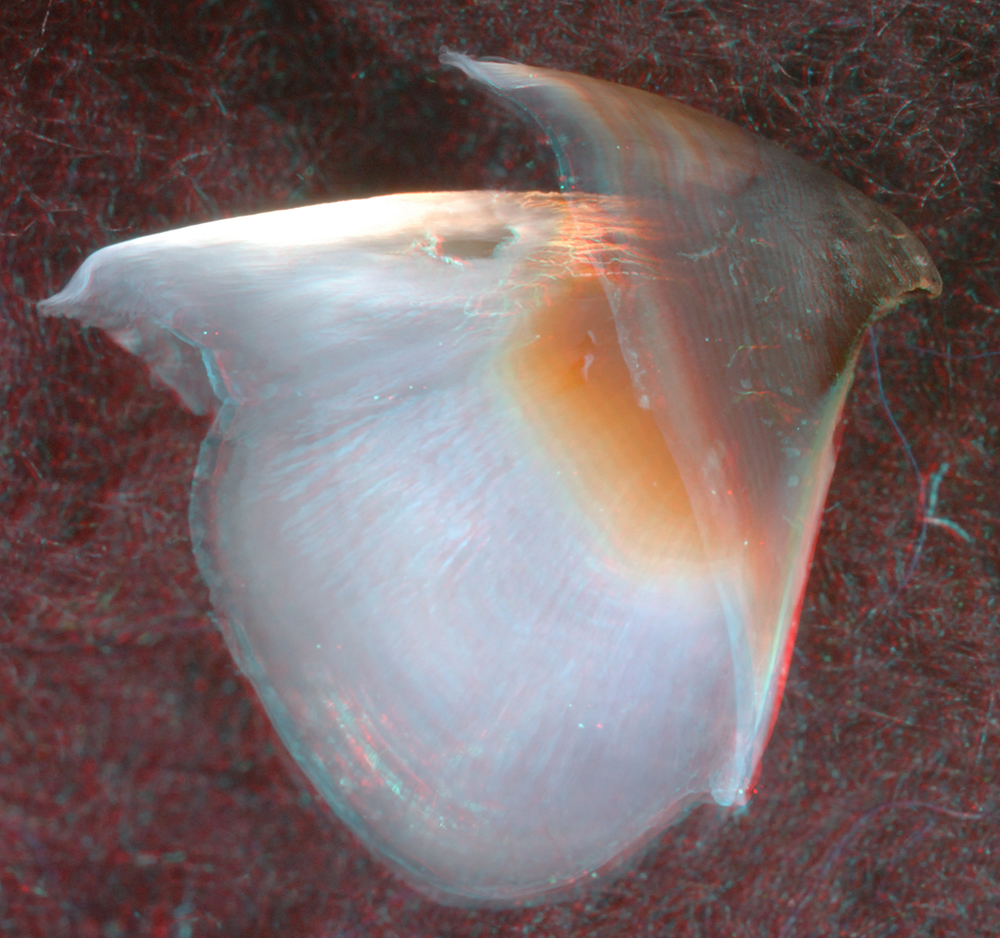
Upper beak of a female

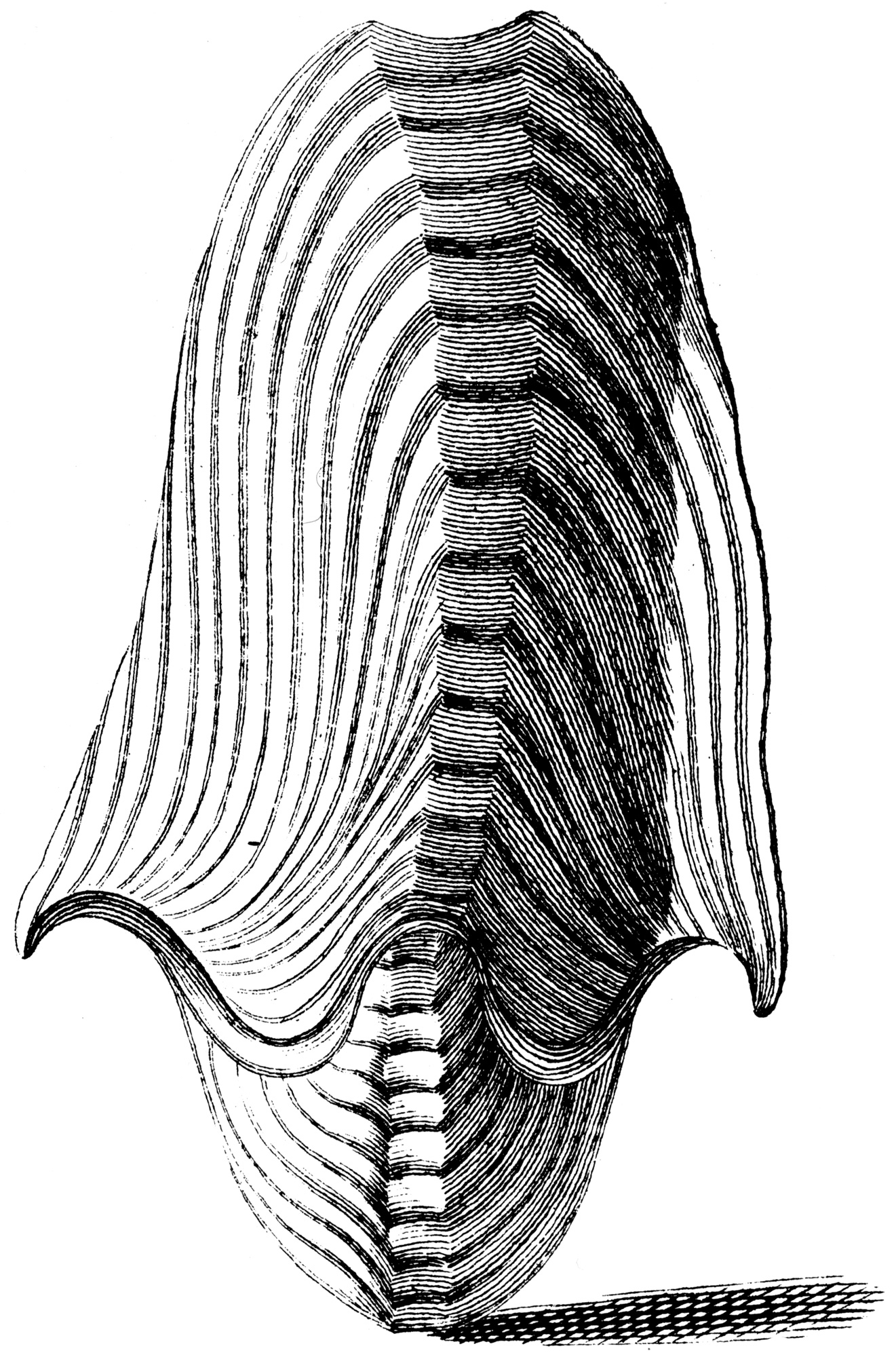
One of the earliest known depictions of A. argo, from Index Testarum Conchyliorum (1742) by Niccolò Gualtieri

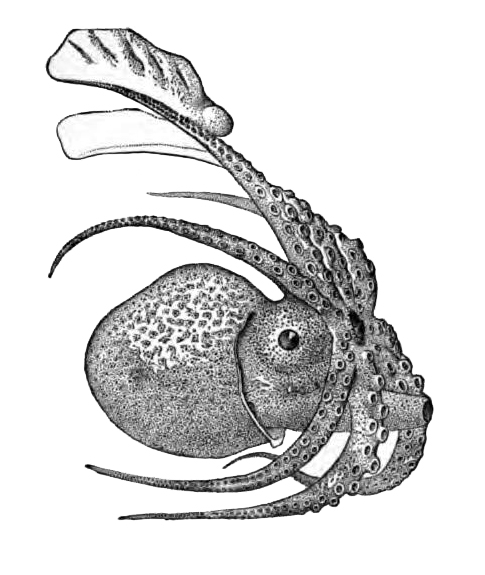
Illustration of a female A. argo without its shell
