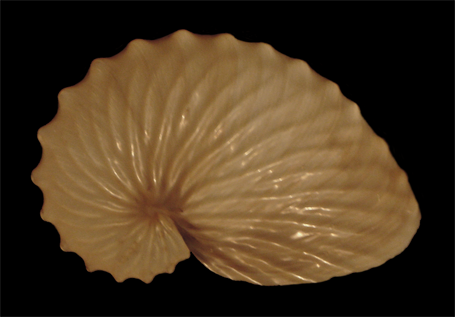
- Eggcase of Argonauta hians

Conservation status
- Least Concern (IUCN 3.1)

Scientific classification
- Kingdom: Animalia
- Phylum: Mollusca
- Class: Cephalopoda
- Order: Octopoda
- Family: Argonautidae
- Genus: Argonauta
- Species: A. hians

Binomial name
- Argonauta hians Lightfoot, 1786

Synonyms
- Argonauta gondola Dillwyn, 1817; ?Argonauta haustrum Dillwyn, 1817; ?Ocythoe cranchii Leach, 1817; Argonauta nitida Lamarck, 1822 in 1815-1822; Argonauta crassicosta Blainville, 1826; ?Argonauta raricosta Leach in Blainville, 1826; Octopus (Philonexis) minimus d'Orbigny, 1834 in 1834-1847; Argonauta owenii A. Adams & Reeve, 1848 in 1848-1850; Argonauta kochiana Dunker, 1852; ?Argonauta cornuta Conrad, 1854; ?Argonauta dispar [?=A. cornuta] Conrad, 1854; Argonauta polita Conrad, 1854; ?Argonauta hians f. aurita Von Martens, 1867; ?Argonauta hians f. mutica Von Martens, 1867; ?Argonauta hians f. obtusangula Von Martens, 1867; ?Argonauta expansa [=A. cornuta] Dall, 1872

= Argonauta hians =

Winged argonaut

Species of mollusc

Argonauta hians, also known as the winged argonaut, muddy argonaut or brown paper nautilus, is a species of pelagic octopus. The common name comes from the grey to brown coloured shell. The Chinese name for this species translates as "grey sea-horse's nest". The female of the species, like all argonauts, creates a paper-thin eggcase that coils around the octopus much like the way a nautilus lives in its shell (hence the name paper nautilus). The eggcase is characterised by a wide keel that gives it a square appearance, few rounded tubercles along the keel, and less than 40 smooth ribs across the sides of the shell. The shell is usually approximately 80 mm in length, although it can exceed 120 mm in exceptional specimens; the world record size is 121.5 mm.

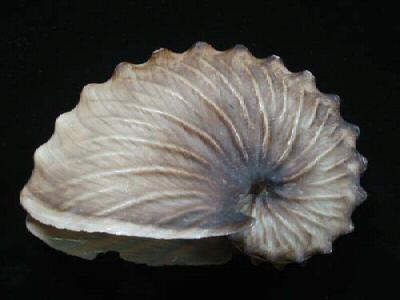
"Northern" form of Argonauta hians, Taiwan (121.5 mm)

A. hians is cosmopolitan, occurring in tropical and subtropical waters worldwide. It is an extremely variable species and there appear to exist at least two distinct forms; a "southern" form and "northern" form (see images). The former is most abundant in the Philippines and South China Sea. It is a much smaller animal, with a shell that rarely exceeds 80 mm and lacks the winged protrusions for which this species is named. The "northern" form, which is found in the waters surrounding Taiwan, Hong Kong and Japan, produces a much larger, darker and more robust shell that can reach 120 mm and has the characteristic winged protrusions. It is usually less elongated than that of the "southern" form and lacks its porcelain-like shine. Further research is needed to determine whether these forms represent two separate species or not.

A. hians feeds primarily on pelagic molluscs. Remains of heteropods have been reported from the stomachs of A. hians. The species is preyed on by numerous predators. It has been reported in the stomach contents of Alepisaurus ferox from the south-western Pacific.

Males of this species reach sexual maturity at a mantle length (ML) of about 7 mm, presumably the maximum size attained. Females mature at about half the size of Argonauta argo. They begin to secrete an eggcase at 6.5–7 mm ML. Egg laying usually commences when females reach 14–15 mm ML; by 18–20 mm ML female A. hians have laid their eggs. However, the size at which this takes place differs across the animal's range. Females grow to 50 mm ML, while males do not exceed 20 mm ML.

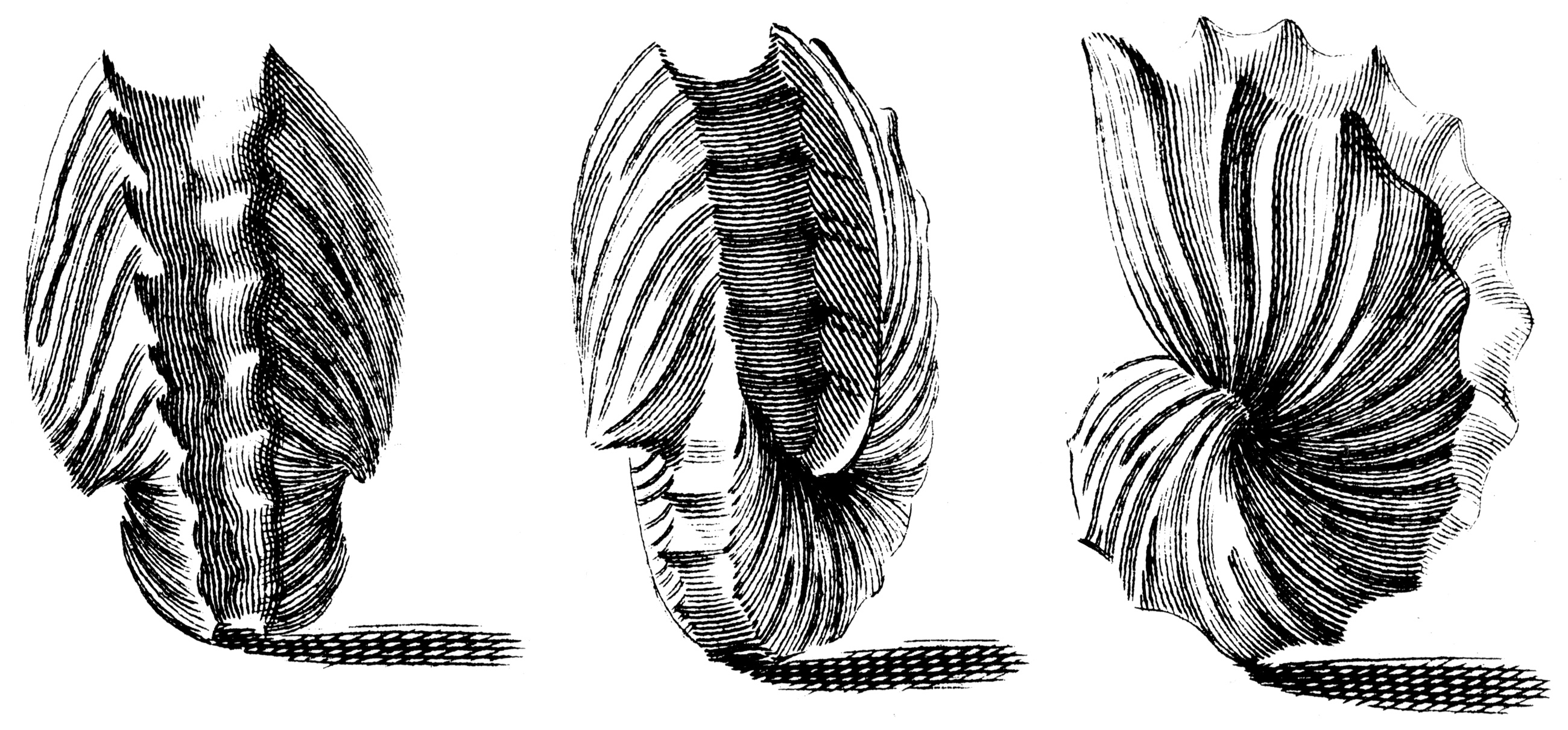
One of the earliest known depictions of A. hians, from Index Testarum Conchyliorum (1742) by Niccolò Gualtieri

A. hians is known to cling to objects floating on the surface of the sea, including other argonauts. Chains of up to 20-30 argonauts of similar size have been reported. The first female in such chains usually clings to some inanimate object, while the other females hold on to the ventral part of the shell of the preceding animal. Gilbert L. Voss and Gordon Williamson observed six freshly mated female A. hians off Hong Kong that were swimming along in a string.

In the open ocean, A. hians is often observed attached to jellyfish. It has been photographed atop the jellyfish Phyllorhiza punctata in the Philippines. This behaviour has been known for a long time, although little was understood about the relationship prior to the work of Heeger et al. in 1992.

Underwater photographer Mark Strickland observed and photographed a female A. hians clinging to a jellyfish in the Mergui Archipelago, Andaman Sea, Myanmar. The argonaut was observed using the jellyfish as cover, rotating the animal to hide itself from potential predators (in this case the photographer). The argonaut was also seen using the jellyfish as a 'hunting platform', as it "manoeuvered its host close to a smaller comb jelly, quickly grasped it with another pair of tentacles and devoured it".

A. hians appears to be closely related to the smaller A. bottgeri from the Indian Ocean and A. cornuta from the north-east Pacific. The oldest known fossil material of A. hians originates from the middle Pliocene Sadowara Formation of southwestern Japan. In terms of eggcase morphology, A. hians resembles the extinct A. sismondai.

The type locality and type repository of A. hians are unknown.

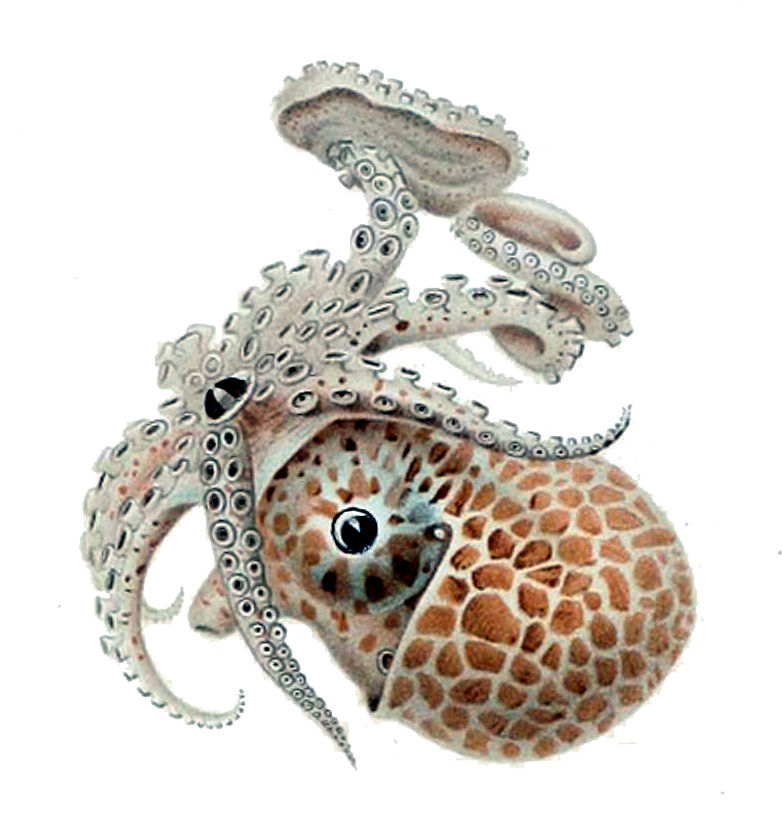
Juvenile female (6.5 mm ML) from the equatorial South Atlantic

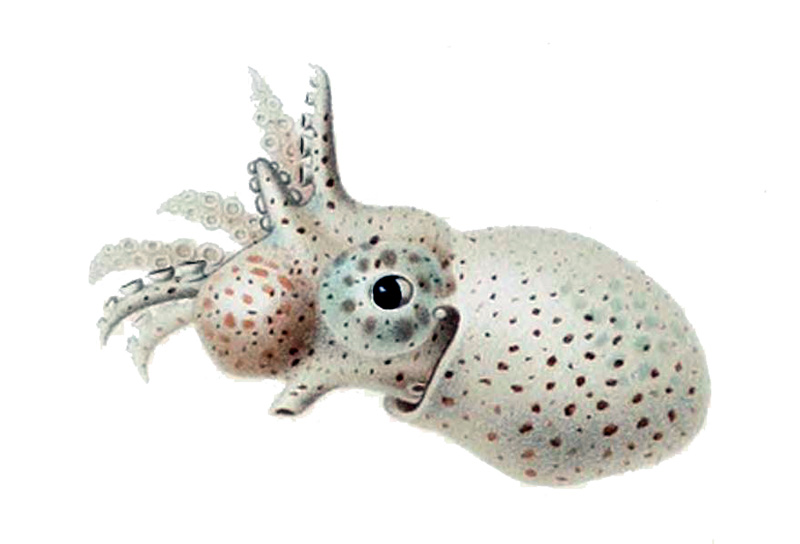
Apparently immature male (5.0 mm ML) from the equatorial South Atlantic

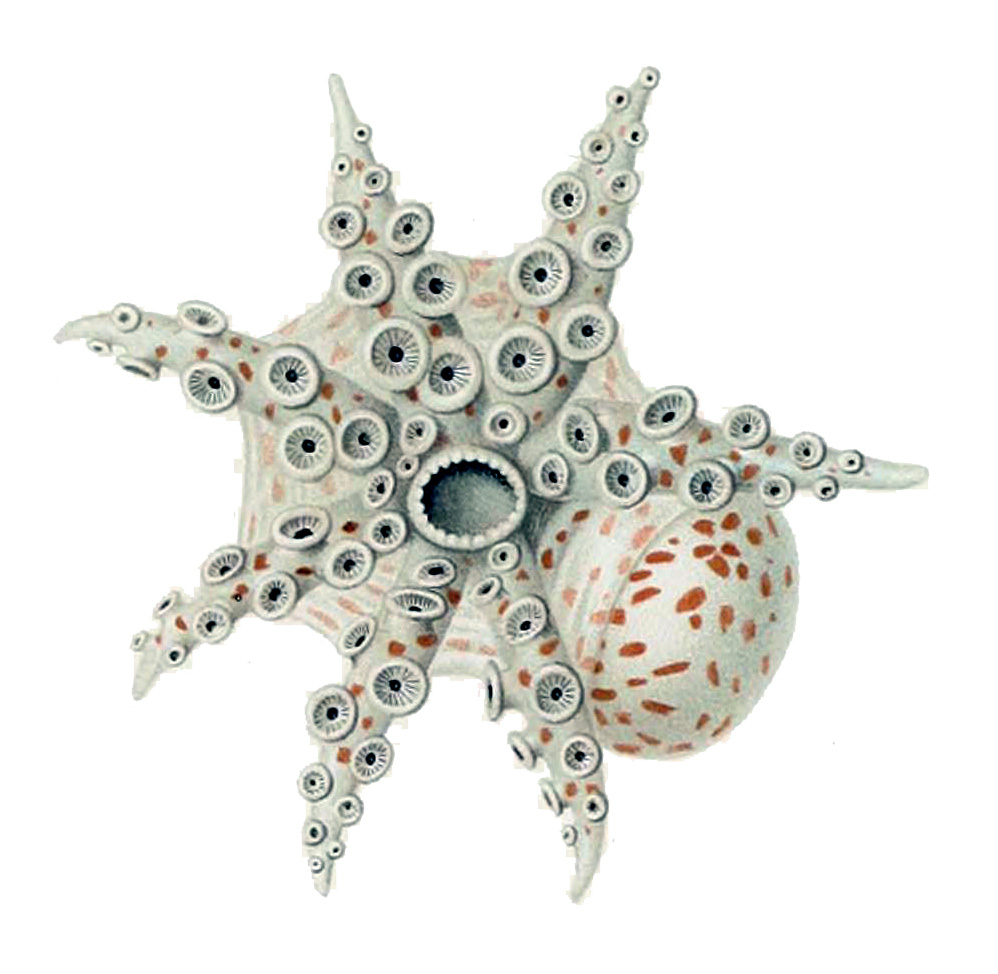
Oral view of the same animal; note the modified hectocotylus

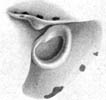
Funnel–mantle locking apparatus of juvenile male (5.0 mm ML) from the equatorial South Atlantic
