= Izumonauta =

Izumonauta Temporal range: Miocene

Scientific classification
- Domain: Eukaryota
- Kingdom: Animalia
- Phylum: Mollusca
- Class: Cephalopoda
- Order: Octopoda
- Family: Argonautidae
- Genus: †Izumonauta; Kobayashi, 1954

Species
- †Izumonauta lata Kobayashi, 1954; †Izumonauta kagana Kaseno, 1955; †Izumonauta kasataniensis Kaseno, 1955

Extinct genus of molluscs

Izumonauta is an extinct genus of shelled octopods from the Mid to Late Miocene of Japan and New Zealand.

The keels of Izumonauta eggcases lack tubercules and are intermediate in morphology between those of the earlier Obinautilus and later Argonauta.

The New Zealand fossil material was described from the Kapitean Stage (uppermost Miocene).
