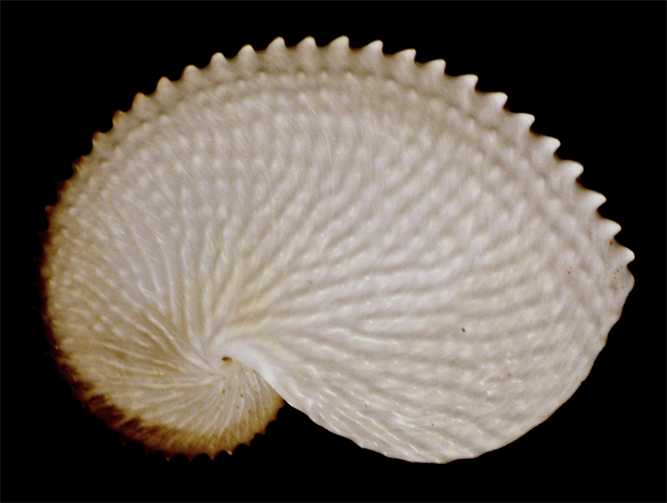
- Eggcase of Argonauta nodosus

Conservation status
- Least Concern (IUCN 3.1)

Scientific classification
- Kingdom: Animalia
- Phylum: Mollusca
- Class: Cephalopoda
- Order: Octopoda
- Family: Argonautidae
- Genus: Argonauta
- Species: A. nodosus

Binomial name
- Argonauta nodosus Lightfoot, 1786

Synonyms
- ?Argonauta oryzata Meuschen, 1787; Argonauta tuberculata Röding, 1798; Argonauta tuberculosa Lamarck, 1822 in 1815-1822; Argonauta gracilis Kirk, 1885

= Argonauta nodosa =

Knobby Argonaut

Species of mollusc

Argonauta nodosus [previously known as Argonauta nodosa], also known as the knobby or knobbed argonaut, is a species of pelagic octopus. The female of the species, like all argonauts, creates a paper-thin eggcase that coils around the octopus much like the way a nautilus lives in its shell (hence the name paper nautilus). The shell is usually approximately 150 mm in length, although it can exceed 250 mm in exceptional specimens; the world record size is 292.0 mm. A. nodosus produces a very characteristic shell, which is covered in many small nodules on the ridges across the shell, hence the specific epithet nodosus and common name. These nodules are less obvious or even absent in juvenile females, especially those under 5 cm in length. All other argonaut species have smooth ridges across the shell walls.

== Description ==
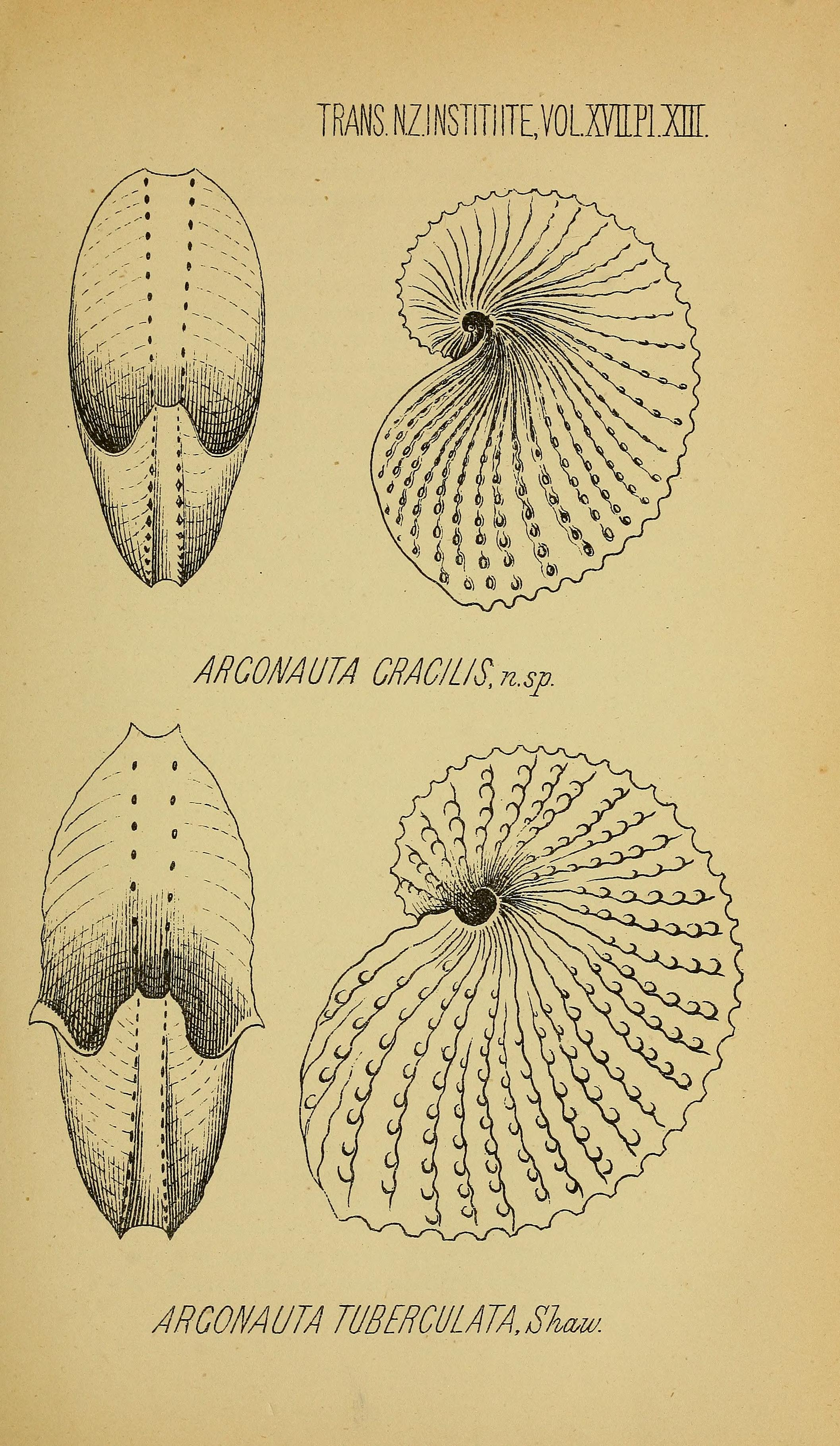
Eggcases of A. tuberculata and A. gracilis from Thomas William Kirk's description of the latter. Both taxa are now considered synonyms of A. nodosus.

Females grow to 100 mm ML and 300 mm total length, while males do not exceed 40 mm in length. The specialised webbed arm pair of this species is covered in numerous chromatophores. Mark Norman notes that "the colour of these webs can quickly change from maroon red to reflective silver". It has been reported that the egg clusters of A. nodosus from southern Australia can be clearly divided into three portions, each with eggs at a similar developmental stage. Similar development has been observed in the egg masses of Argonauta bottgeri.

== Distribution ==
A. nodosus has a relatively wide distribution covering the Indo-Pacific region as well as the eastern coast of South America. The species is most common in southern Australia, New Zealand, and South Africa. It is only known from the Southern Hemisphere. The type specimen of A. nodosus was collected off the Cape of Good Hope. The type repository is unknown. A. nodosus is occasionally involved in mass strandings along the South African and southern Australian coastlines. The strandings are seasonal and generally occur between April and August, towards the end of the animals' spawning season.

== Prey ==
A. nodosus is thought to feed primarily on pelagic molluscs. Captive females have been observed readily taking dead prawns and fish. The species is preyed on by numerous predators. It has been reported in the stomach contents of Alepisaurus ferox from the south-western Pacific. A. nodosus has also been found in the stomach contents of Australian fur seals, Arctocephalus pusillus doriferus, in the Bass Strait and southern Tasmania.

== In a human context ==
In traditional Māori culture of New Zealand, Argonauta nodosa (known as pūpu tarakihi) is a symbol of new growth and rebirth, as the shape of the animal resembles koru, unfurling fern fronds, which have a similar meaning in art. They are involved in many traditional stories, notably the waiata "He Ata te Hau", which recounts a dream the Ngāti Whātua tohunga Tītahi had of a mass beaching of white Argonauta nodosa driven by the north wind, which became seen as a prophecy of Europeans arriving to New Zealand.

== Gallery ==
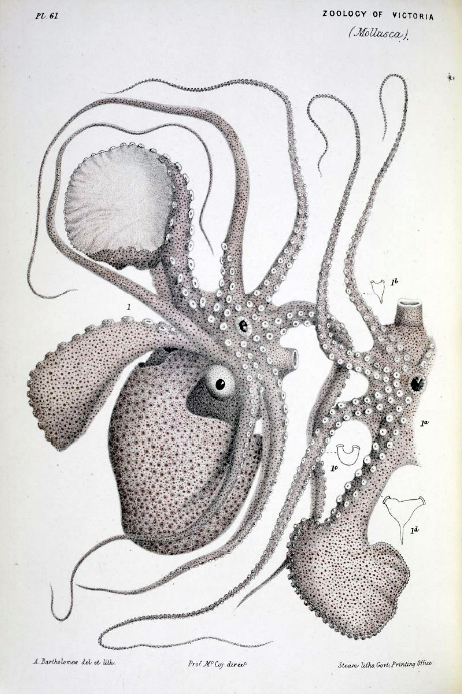
Female A. nodosus with eggcase removed

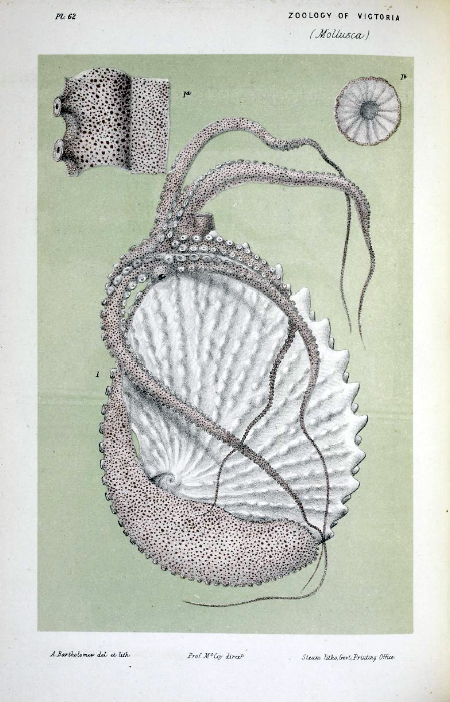
Female A. nodosus with eggcase present

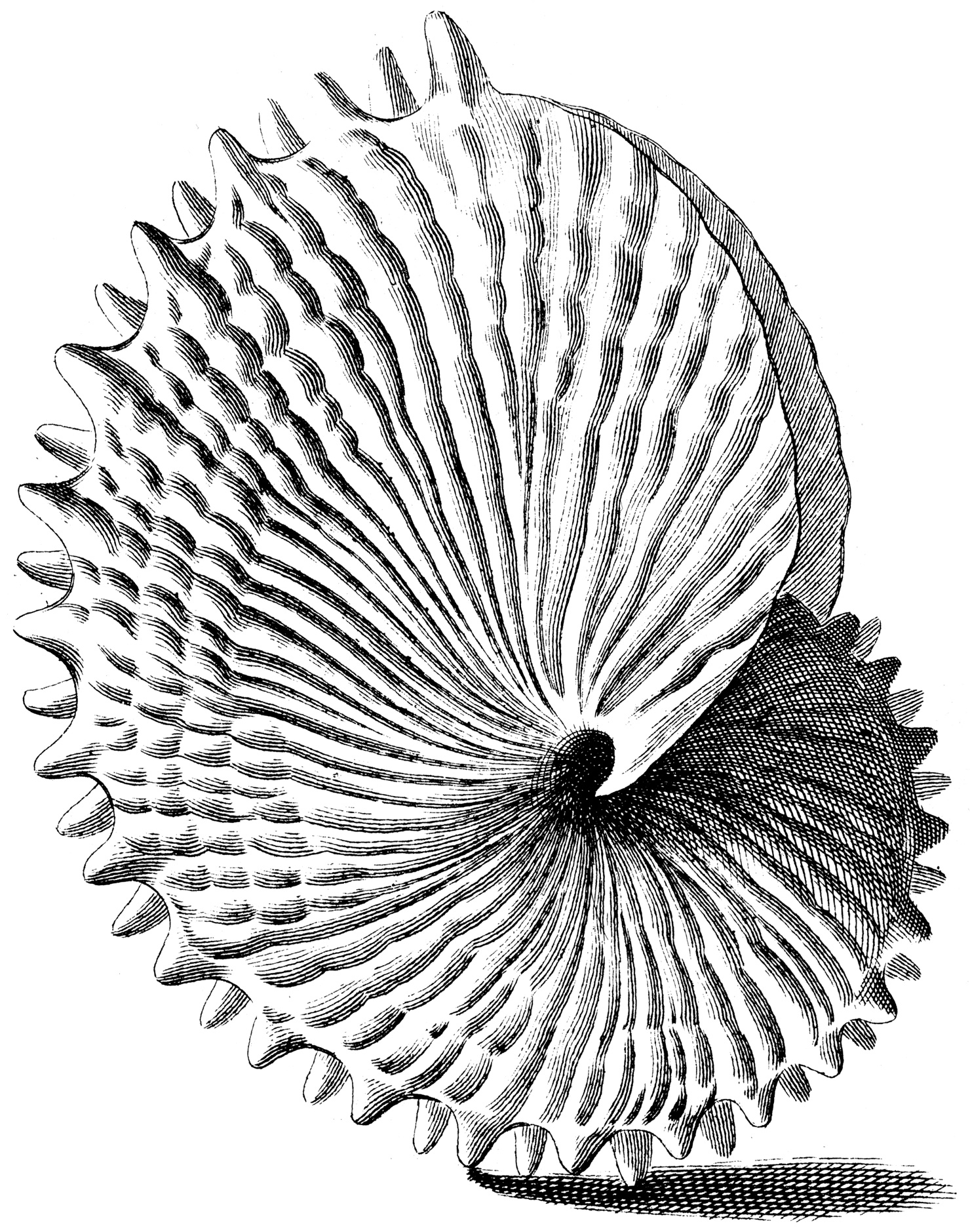
One of the earliest known depictions of A. nodosus, from Index Testarum Conchyliorum (1742) by Niccolò Gualtieri

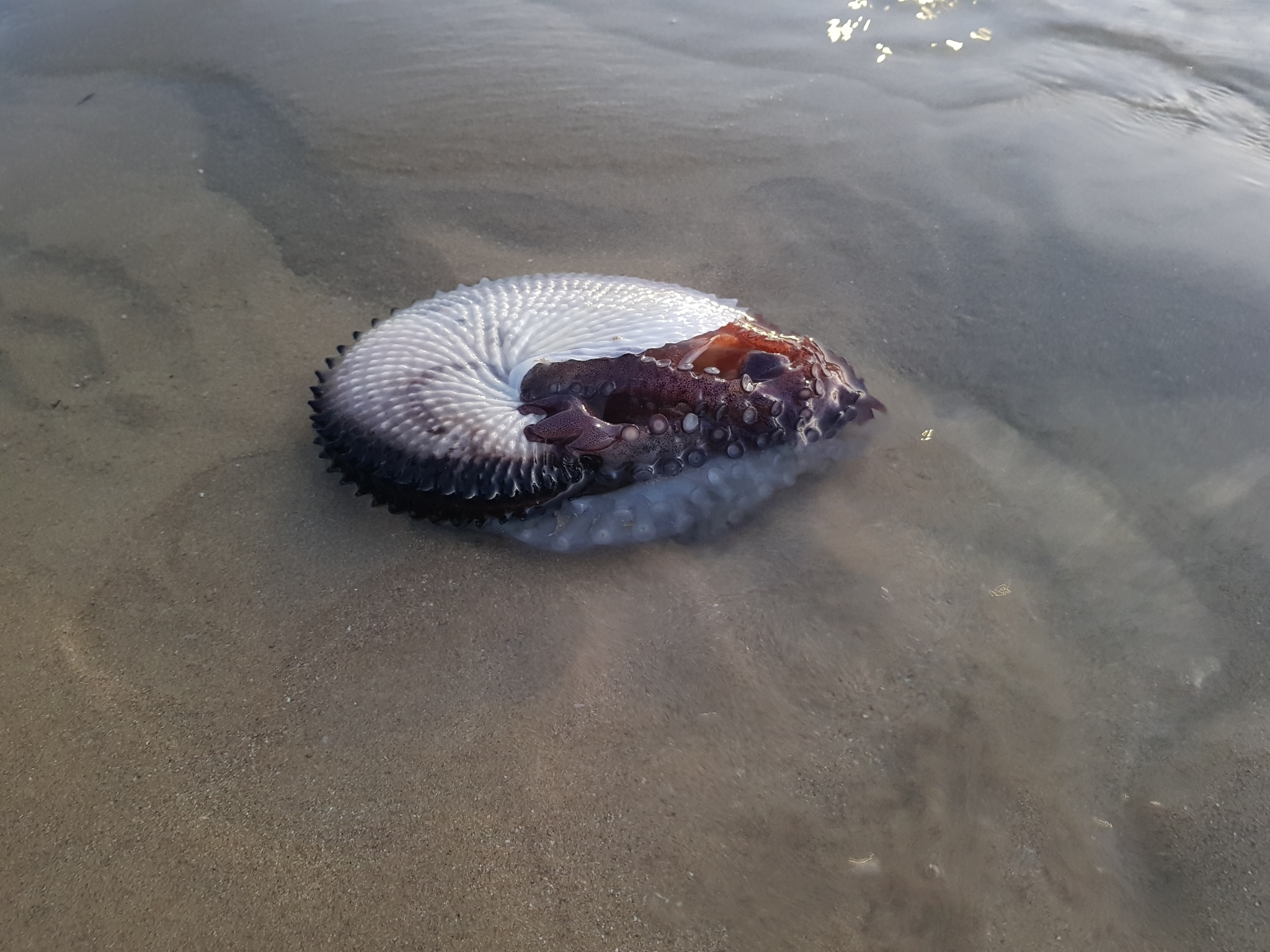
A beached A. nodosus found at Port Phillip, Australia
