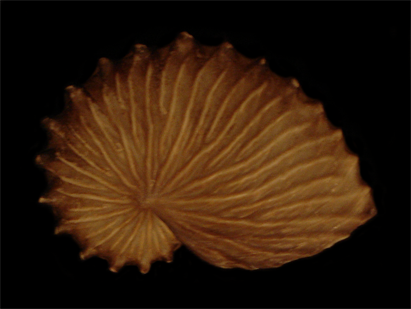
- Eggcase of Argonauta bottgeri

Conservation status
- Least Concern (IUCN 3.1)

Scientific classification
- Kingdom: Animalia
- Phylum: Mollusca
- Class: Cephalopoda
- Order: Octopoda
- Family: Argonautidae
- Genus: Argonauta
- Species: A. bottgeri

Binomial name
- Argonauta bottgeri Maltzan, 1881

Synonyms
- Argonauta boettgeri orth. var.

= Argonauta bottgeri =

Böttger's argonaut

Species of mollusc

Argonauta bottgeri, also known as Böttger's argonaut, is a species of pelagic octopus belonging to the genus Argonauta. The female of the species, like all argonauts, creates a paper-thin eggcase that coils around the octopus much like the way a nautilus lives in its shell (hence the name paper nautilus).

A. bottgeri is the smallest argonaut species. The eggcase rarely exceeds 50 mm in diameter, although exceptional specimens have been known to grow up to 67.0 mm. A. bottgeri is similar to Argonauta hians, but differs in having more pronounced ribs and prominent tubercles on the keel. The eggcase does not have winged protrusions as is sometimes the case with A. hians. It is generally darker than that of any other species, ranging in colour from ochre-yellow to almost black, although completely white specimens have been reported from South African waters. The eggcase is finely granulated and normally lacks the porcelain-like shine of other species.

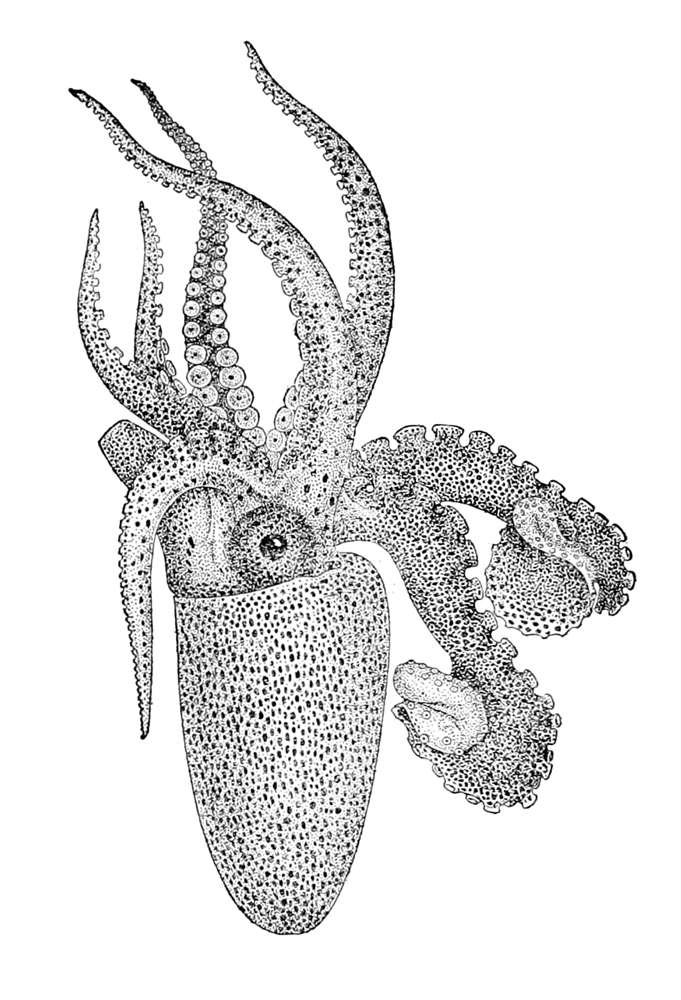
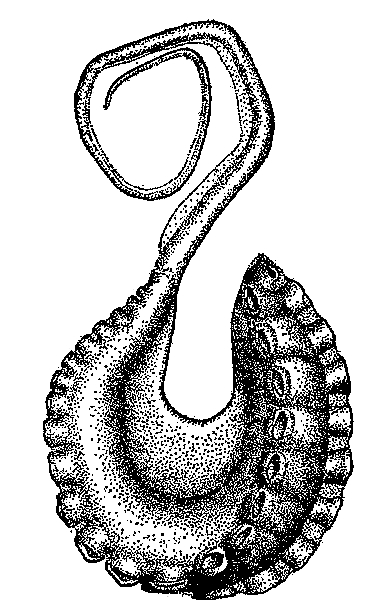
Left: Lateral view of female (characteristic body flexures not shown)
Right: Hectocotylus of male

A. bottgeri is best known from the waters off southern and eastern Africa, although it has also been reported from other parts of the Indian Ocean and from the western Pacific Ocean. The locus classicus of A. bottgeri is Mozambique.

A. bottgeri feeds primarily on pelagic molluscs, especially heteropods and pteropods, with other octopods constituting a smaller portion of the animal's diet. Females from Japanese waters have been reported to prey on the pteropod Carolina tridentata. The species is preyed on by numerous predators. A. bottgeri has been reported in the stomach contents of yellowfin tuna from the Indian Ocean.

Males of this species reach sexual maturity at a mantle length (ML) of about 7 mm, presumably the maximum size attained. Females begin to secrete an eggcase at 6.5 to 7 mm ML. Female A. bottgeri as small as 11 to 13 mm ML have been reported with hectocotyli in the mantle cavity. They mature at about half the size of Argonauta argo. Eggs are usually laid when females reach 14 or 15 mm ML, although the size at which this takes place differs across the animal's range.

It has been reported that the egg clusters of A. bottgeri can be clearly divided into three portions, each with eggs at a similar developmental stage. The first lies closest to the aperture of the eggcase and contains eggs at an early stage of development. The second is located in the middle of the mass and contains eggs at a later stage of development, ranging from the appearance of red eye pigmentation to the beginning of chromatophore formation. The third portion lies furthest from the aperture of the eggcase and consists of eggs with embryos that are ready to hatch, having a fully formed ink sac, chromatophores, and dark coloured eyes. Similar development has been observed in the egg masses of Argonauta nodosa from southern Australia. Egg laying is thought to occur at night and it has been suggested that the three stages of development may represent the products of three successive nights.

A. bottgeri is known to cling to objects floating on the surface of the sea, including other argonauts. Chains of up to 30 argonauts of similar size have been reported. The first female in such chains usually clings to some inanimate object, while the other females hold on to the ventral part of the shell of the preceding animal.

A. bottgeri is named after Oskar Boettger. The orthographic variant "Argonauta boettgeri" is sometimes encountered. A. bottgeri does not appear to have any nomenclatural synonyms. The type locality and type repository of A. bottgeri are unknown.
