= Argonauta itoigawai =

Argonauta itoigawai Temporal range: Pliocene

Scientific classification
- Kingdom: Animalia
- Phylum: Mollusca
- Class: Cephalopoda
- Order: Octopoda
- Family: Argonautidae
- Genus: Argonauta
- Species: †A. itoigawai

Binomial name
- †Argonauta itoigawai Tomida, 1983

Extinct species of mollusc

Argonauta itoigawai is an extinct species of octopus. It was described in 1983 based on fossil material from the Pliocene Senhata Formation in Bōsō Peninsula, Japan.
