= Argonauta absyrtus =

Argonauta absyrtus Temporal range: Miocene

Scientific classification
- Kingdom: Animalia
- Phylum: Mollusca
- Class: Cephalopoda
- Order: Octopoda
- Family: Argonautidae
- Genus: Argonauta
- Species: †A. absyrtus

Binomial name
- †Argonauta absyrtus Martill & Barker, 2006

Extinct species of mollusc

†Argonauta absyrtus is an extinct species of octopus assigned to the genus Argonauta.

A. absyrtus was described in 2006 based on fossil material from the Serravallian (Middle Miocene) Pakhna Formation of southern Cyprus. It represents the first argonaut fossil reported from the eastern Mediterranean.
