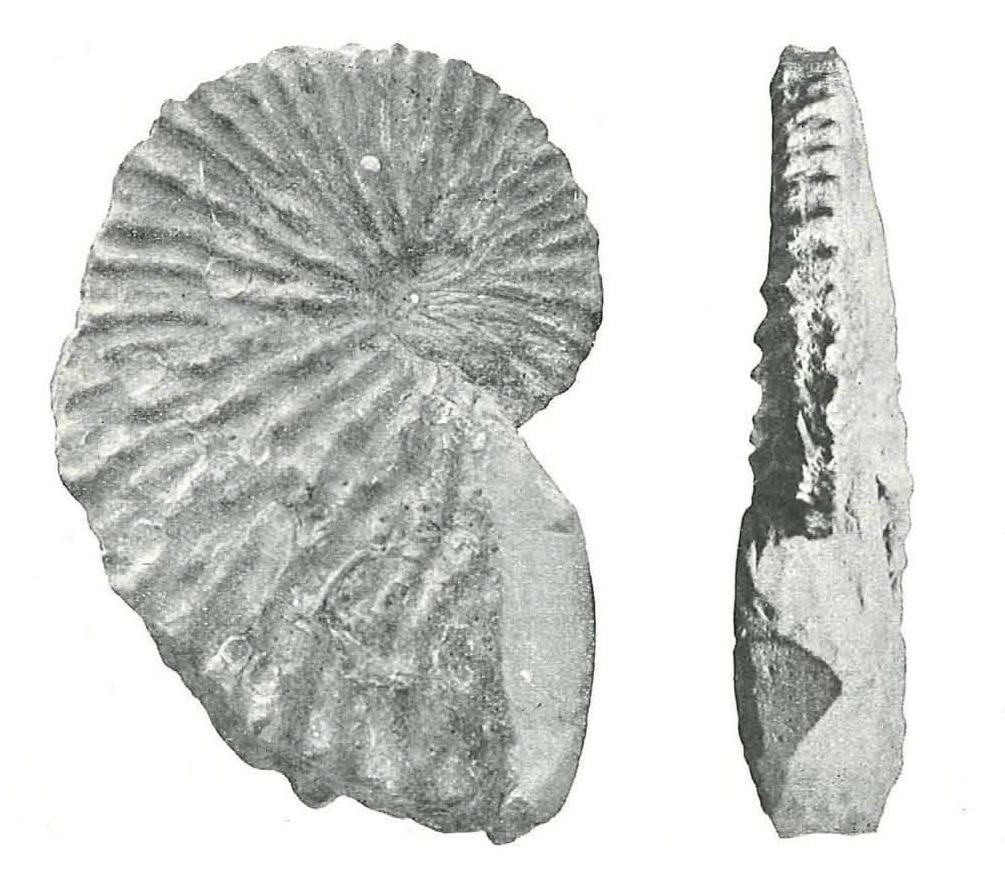
- Type specimen (lateral and keel views)

Scientific classification
- Kingdom: Animalia
- Phylum: Mollusca
- Class: Cephalopoda
- Order: Octopoda
- Family: Argonautidae
- Genus: Argonauta
- Species: †A. joanneus

Binomial name
- †Argonauta joanneus Hilber, 1915

= Argonauta joanneus =

Argonauta joanneus Temporal range: Middle Miocene

Extinct species of mollusc

Argonauta joanneus is an extinct species of octopus assigned to the genus Argonauta. It was described in 1915 based on fossil material from the Middle Miocene of Austria. It was found in fine sandy clay.

The type specimen, a fossilised eggcase, measures 84 mm in diameter at its widest point but is only 18 mm thick. The mouth is 48 mm wide.
