= Argonauta oweri =

Argonauta oweri Temporal range: Pliocene

Scientific classification
- Kingdom: Animalia
- Phylum: Mollusca
- Class: Cephalopoda
- Order: Octopoda
- Family: Argonautidae
- Genus: Argonauta
- Species: †A. oweri

Binomial name
- †Argonauta oweri Fleming, 1945

Extinct species of mollusc

Argonauta oweri is an extinct species of argonautid octopus. It is known from the early Pliocene of New Zealand.

The type specimen, a fossilised eggcase, measures 118 mm in diameter. Its aperture is 95 mm high and 40 mm across at its widest point (though it is slightly crushed). It was collected by John R. Ower of Superior Oil Company (after whom it is named) in a "limy concretionary boulder" in Hautapu River, due west of Flat Spur and 1.4 miles (2.3 km) southeast of Utiku, New Zealand.

The fossil was not found in situ and therefore its parent formation is unknown, though Hautapu River flows exclusively through early Pliocene rocks and according to the describing author "the horizon is almost certainly Waitotaran".
