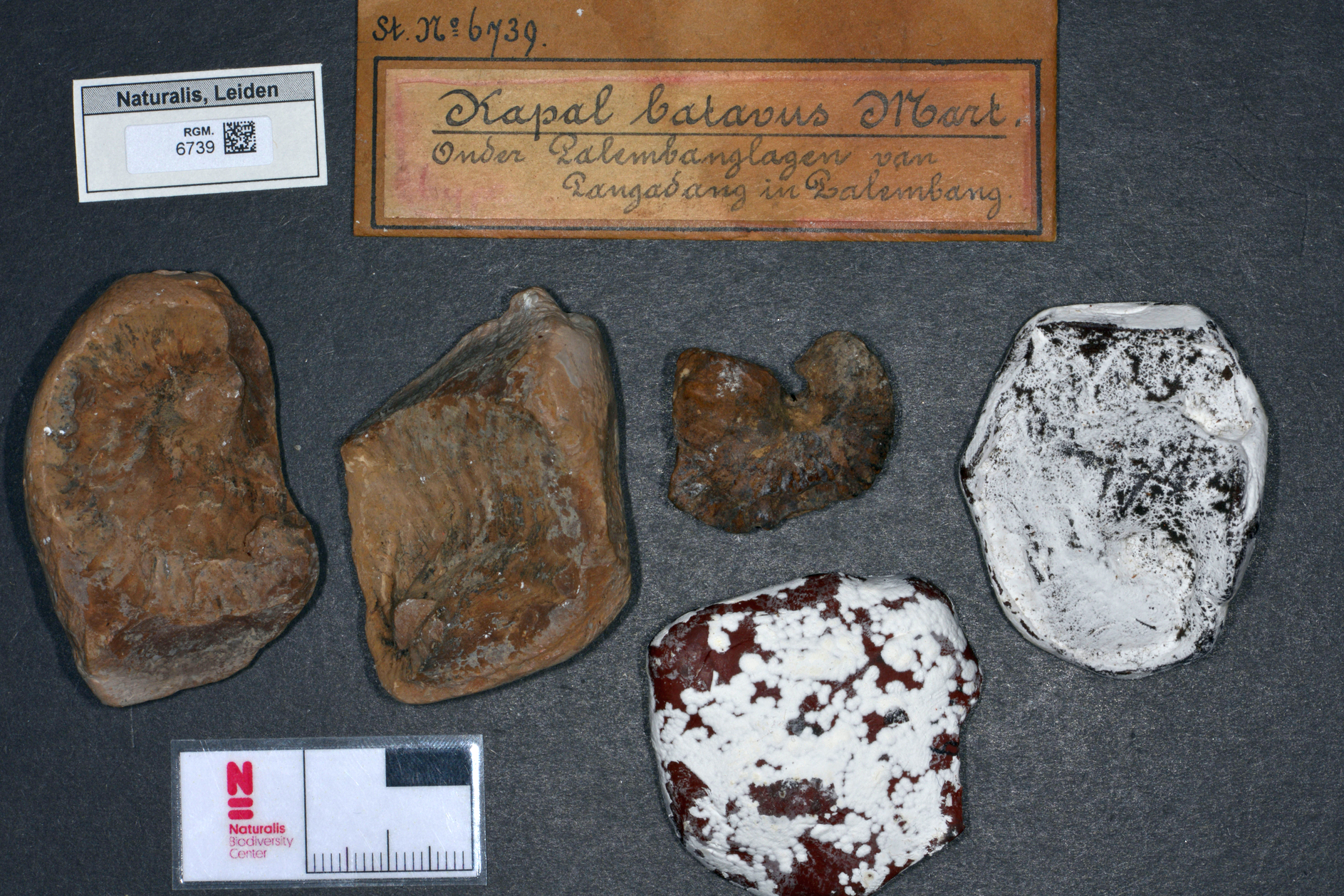

Scientific classification
- Kingdom: Animalia
- Phylum: Mollusca
- Class: Cephalopoda
- Order: Octopoda
- Family: Argonautidae
- Genus: †Kapal; Martin, 1930
- Species: †K. batavus

Binomial name
- †Kapal batavus Martin, 1930

= Kapal =

Kapal Temporal range: Miocene

Genus of molluscs

Kapal is a monotypic genus of shelled octopods comprising the species Kapal batavus.

Kapal batavus was described in 1930 based on fossil material from Lower Palembang shales of Sumatra. The eggcase of this species is considerably more evolute than that of Argonauta, possessing an open umbilical region, and seems to lack the nodes present in members of that genus.

Kapal is Indonesian for "ship".
