= Argonauta sismondai =

Argonauta sismondai Temporal range: Pliocene

Scientific classification
- Kingdom: Animalia
- Phylum: Mollusca
- Class: Cephalopoda
- Order: Octopoda
- Family: Argonautidae
- Genus: Argonauta
- Species: †A. sismondai

Binomial name
- †Argonauta sismondai Bellardi, 1872

Extinct species of mollusc

Argonauta sismondai is an extinct species of argonautid octopus. It was described from fossil remains dating to the Pliocene. In terms of eggcase morphology it is considered closest to the extant A. hians.
