= Argonauta tokunagai =

Argonauta tokunagai Temporal range: Miocene

Scientific classification
- Kingdom: Animalia
- Phylum: Mollusca
- Class: Cephalopoda
- Order: Octopoda
- Family: Argonautidae
- Genus: Argonauta
- Species: †A. tokunagai

Binomial name
- †Argonauta tokunagai Yokoyama, 1913

Extinct species of mollusc

Argonauta tokunagai is an extinct species of octopus. It was described in 1913 based on fossil material from the Middle Miocene Huzina Formation of Japan.

Undescribed fossil species of Argonauta related to this taxon have been temporarily designated Argonauta cf. tokunagai and Argonauta "tokunagai".
