= Mizuhobaris =

Mizuhobaris Temporal range: Miocene
- Mizuhobaris izumoensis

Scientific classification
- Kingdom: Animalia
- Phylum: Mollusca
- Class: Cephalopoda
- Order: Octopoda
- Family: Argonautidae
- Genus: †Mizuhobaris; Yokoyama, 1913

Species
- †Mizuhobaris izumoensis Yokoyama, 1913; †Mizuhobaris lepta Saul & Stadum, 2005

Extinct genus of molluscs

Mizuhobaris is an extinct genus of shelled octopods from the Late Miocene.

Fossils of M. lepta ware found in the Los Angeles Basin, California. This species is characterised by low radial ribs on a thin, keelless, planispirally coiled eggcase. It represents the first Argonautidae fossil from the Western Hemisphere.
