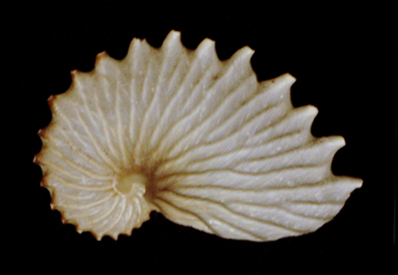
- Eggcase of Argonauta cornuta

Conservation status
- Data Deficient (IUCN 3.1)

Scientific classification
- Kingdom: Animalia
- Phylum: Mollusca
- Class: Cephalopoda
- Order: Octopoda
- Family: Argonautidae
- Genus: Argonauta
- Species: A. cornuta

Binomial name
- Argonauta cornuta Conrad, 1854

Synonyms
- ?Argonauta dispar Conrad, 1854; Argonauta expansa Dall, 1872

= Argonauta cornuta =

Species of mollusc

Argonauta cornuta is a species of pelagic octopus belonging to the genus Argonauta. The female of the species, like all argonauts, creates a paper-thin eggcase that coils around the octopus reminiscent of the way a nautilus lives in its shell (hence the name paper nautilus). The shell is usually approximately 80 mm in length, although it can exceed 90 mm in exceptional specimens; the world record size is 98.6 mm.

This species seems to have a relatively limited distribution confined to the waters surrounding Western Mexico and Baja California. For this reason, it is considered one of the rarest of the Argonauta species.

The taxonomic status of this species is questionable. Further research is needed to determine whether it is a valid species or a synonym of the highly variable A. hians.

The type locality of A. cornuta is unknown. The type specimen is deposited at the Academy of Natural Sciences in Philadelphia.
