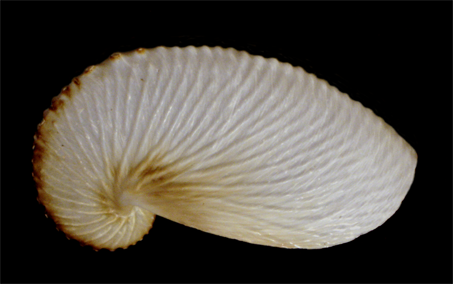
- Eggcase of Argonauta nouryi

Conservation status
- Least Concern (IUCN 3.1)

Scientific classification
- Kingdom: Animalia
- Phylum: Mollusca
- Class: Cephalopoda
- Order: Octopoda
- Family: Argonautidae
- Genus: Argonauta
- Species: A. nouryi

Binomial name
- Argonauta nouryi Lorois, 1852

Synonyms
- Argonauta conradi Parkinson, 1856; Argonauta cornutus Conrad, 1854; Argonauta expansus Dall, 1872; Argonauta gruneri Dunker, 1852

= Argonauta nouryi =

Noury's argonaut

Species of mollusc

Argonauta nouryi, also known as Noury's argonaut, is a species of pelagic octopus. The female of the species, like all argonauts, creates a paper-thin eggcase that coils around the octopus much like the way a nautilus lives in its shell (hence the name paper nautilus). The shell is usually approximately 80 mm in length, although it can exceed 90 mm in exceptional specimens; the world record size is 95.5 mm.

A. nouryi is best known from the waters off the western coast of North America, from Panama to Baja California, but it has also been reported from the south west Pacific, as far away as the Coral Sea. It is considered one of the rarest of the Argonauta species. This, combined with the aesthetically pleasing elongated nature of the shell, make A. nouryi one of the most sought after argonaut species by conchologists.

The type specimen of A. nouryi was collected near the Marquesas Islands. The type repository is unknown.
