= Neale Monks =

Neale Monks (born 1971) is a former palaeontologist at the Natural History Museum in London, where he worked primarily on heteromorph ammonites. He now writes about tropical fish and Macintosh computers.
