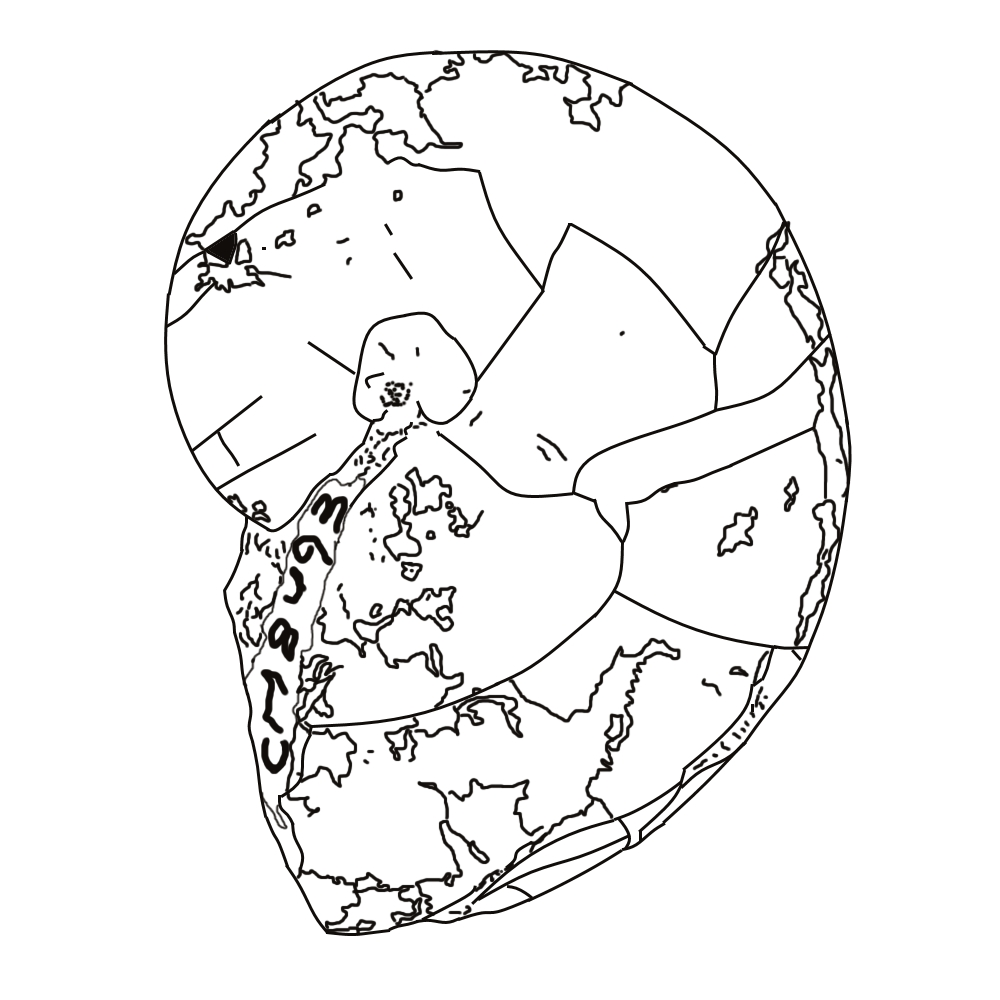
- Obinautilus pulchra

Scientific classification
- Domain: Eukaryota
- Kingdom: Animalia
- Phylum: Mollusca
- Class: Cephalopoda
- Order: Octopoda
- Family: Argonautidae
- Genus: †Obinautilus; Kobayashi, 1954

Species
- †Obinautilus awaensis (Tomida, 1983); †Obinautilus pulcher Kobayashi, 1954

= Obinautilus =

Obinautilus Temporal range: Oligocene – Pliocene

Extinct genus of molluscs

Obinautilus is an extinct genus of shelled cephalopod that has been variously identified as an argonautid octopod or a nautilid. It is known from the Late Oligocene to Pliocene of Japan. The shell is discoidal and very involute, with rapidly expanding and compressed whorls, fine radial ribs, a rounded venter with a shallow furrow, and almost closed umbilicus.

Based on the examination of O. pulcher fossils from the Oligocene, the Tremoctopus–Argonauta divergence has been estimated to have occurred at least 29 million years ago.

== Species ==
Two species are recognised in the genus.

- †Obinautilus awaensis (originally described as Argonauta awaensis) — Pliocene (possibly also latest Miocene) Upper Senhata Formation of Bōsō Peninsula, Japan
- †Obinautilus pulcher (sometimes spelled O. pulchra) — Late Oligocene Nichinan Formation of Japan
