= Niccolò Gualtieri =

Italian medical doctor and malacologist

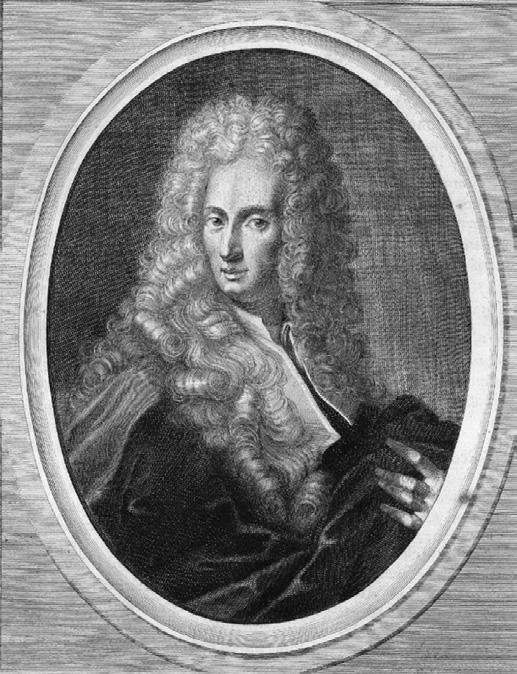
- Born: July 9, 1688; Florence
- Died: February 15, 1744 (aged 55)
- Education: University of Pisa
- Occupations: Physician, malacologist
- Medical career
- Field: Malacology, medicine, botany
- Institutions: University of Pisa

Niccolò Gualtieri (9 July 1688 – 15 February 1744) was an Italian medical doctor and malacologist. He established a private natural history collection, and catalogued its contents, the best known being of the molluscs.

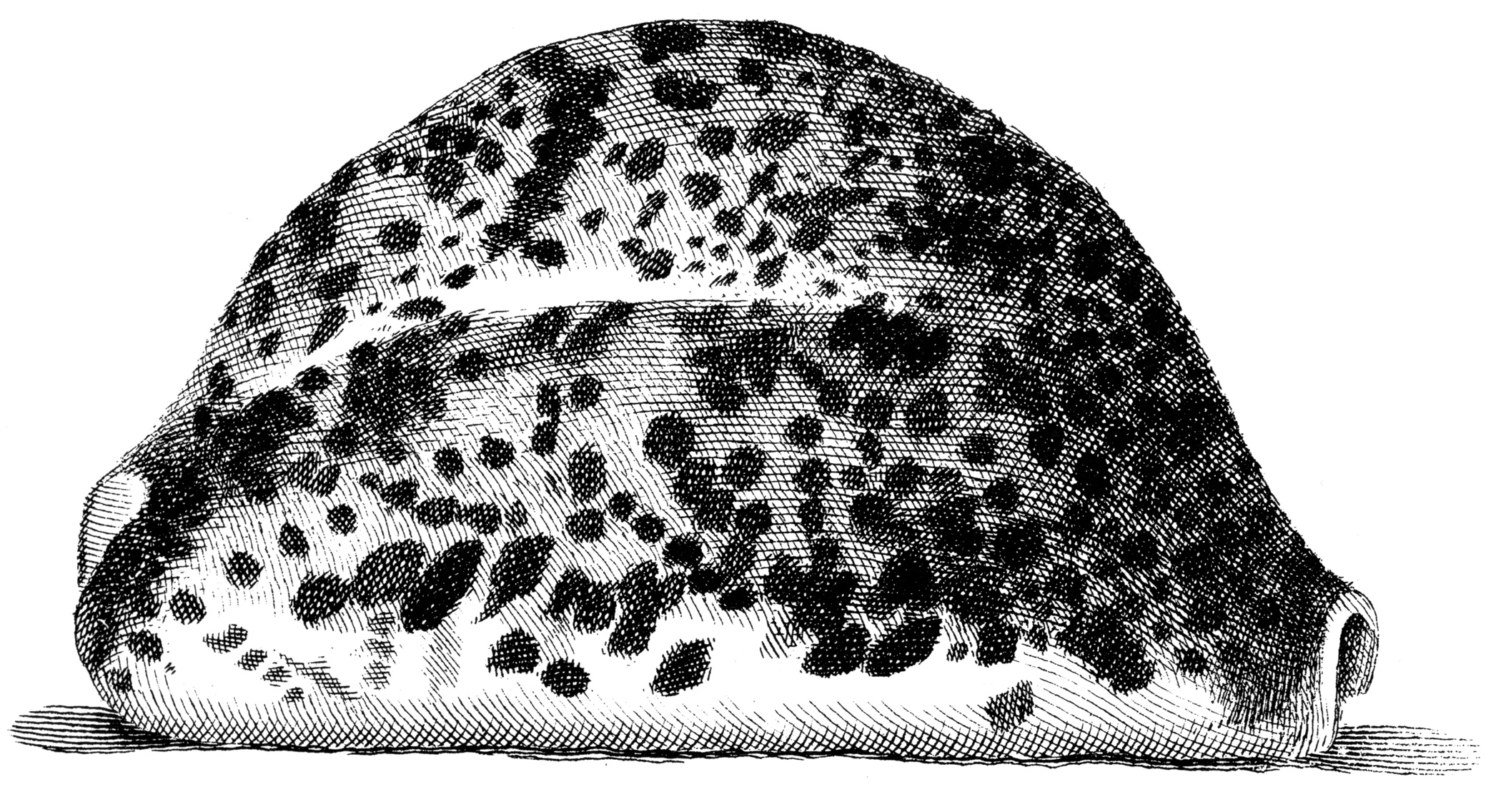
Illustration of the shell of Cypraea tigris in Index Testarum Conchyliorum

Gualtieri was born in Florence and lived briefly in Vienna. He moved to Pisa at the age of 20. Here he studied philosophy and medicine under Giuseppe Zambeccari (1665–1728). He returned to Florence to practice medicine, while also becoming personal physician to Grand Princess Violante di Baviera. In 1716, he was a co-founder of the Florentine Botanical Society along with Pier Antonio Micheli, Gaetano Moniglia and Sebastiano Franchi. He later became physician to the Grand Duke of Tuscany. He had a wide range of interests and contributed poetry apart from participating in learned societies, founding the Societa Botanica Florentina along with other associates. He wrote a pamphlet in 1725 suggesting that perennial springs were fed by sea waters through underground channels. He received enough criticism that the Princess Violante forbade him to write on the topic. In 1731 he began to assemble a private natural history museum, the holding of which he catalogued in 1742, as Index Testarum Conchyliorum, quae adservantur in Museo Nicolai Gualtieri (translation: List of the shells of shellfish which are preserved in the museum of Niccolò Gualtieri) with copper plate engravings by Giuseppe Menabuoni and Antonio Pazzi. After the death of Grand Duke Gian Gastone in 1737, he became a professor at the University of Pisa. He was amongst the first to depict the argonaut. His collections Museo Gualteriano" were acquired by Grand Duke Stefano Lorena and are now deposited at the Museo storia naturale di Pisa. It now includes some 700 specimens of gastropods and bivalves.
