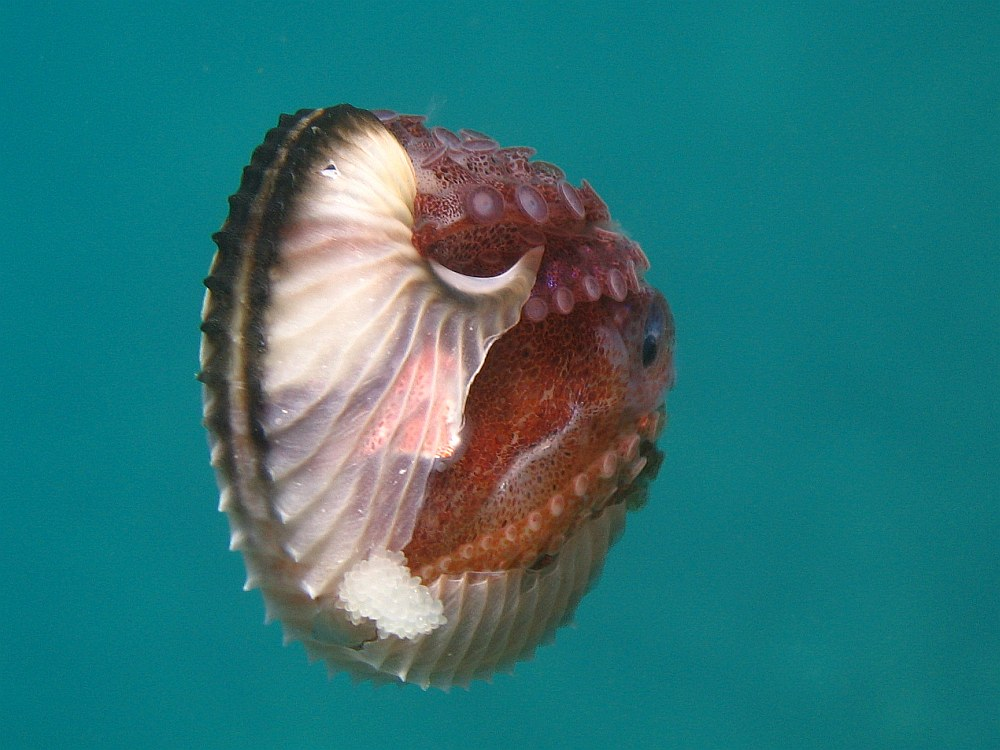
- Female Argonauta argo with its eggs bulging out of its damaged shell

Scientific classification
- Kingdom: Animalia
- Phylum: Mollusca
- Class: Cephalopoda
- Order: Octopoda
- Family: Argonautidae
- Genus: Argonauta; Linnaeus, 1758

Type species
- Argonauta argo Linnaeus, 1758

Species
- Argonauta argo; Argonauta boettgeri*; Argonauta cornutus*; Argonauta hians; Argonauta nodosus; Argonauta nouryi; Argonauta pacificus*; †Argonauta absyrtus; †Argonauta biarmatus; †Argonauta itoigawai; †Argonauta joanneus; †Argonauta oweri; †Argonauta sismondai; †Argonauta tokunagai; *Species status questionable.

Synonyms
- Argonautarius Dumeril, 1806; Todarus nom. nud. Rafinesque, 1815; Todarus Rafinesque, 1840; Trichocephalus Chiaje, 1827 in 1823-1831

= Argonaut (animal) =

Argonauts Temporal range: Miocene – Recent

Genus of cephalopods

The argonauts (genus Argonauta, the only extant genus in the family Argonautidae) are a group of pelagic octopuses. They are also called paper nautili, referring to the paper-thin eggcase that females secrete; however, as octopuses, they are only distant relatives of true nautili. Their structure lacks the gas-filled chambers present in chambered nautilus shells and is not a true cephalopod shell, but rather an evolutionary innovation unique to the genus. It is used as a brood chamber, and to trap surface air to maintain buoyancy. It was once speculated that argonauts did not manufacture their eggcases but utilized shells abandoned by other organisms, in the manner of hermit crabs. Experiments by pioneering marine biologist Jeanne Villepreux-Power in the early 19th century disproved this hypothesis, as Villepreux-Power successfully reared argonaut young and observed their shells' development.

Argonauts are found in tropical and subtropical waters worldwide. They live in the open ocean, i.e. they are pelagic. Like most octopuses, they have a rounded body, eight limbs (arms) and no fins. However, unlike most octopuses, argonauts live close to the surface rather than on the seabed. Argonauta species are characterised by very large eyes and small webs between the arms. The funnel–mantle locking apparatus is a major diagnostic feature of this taxon. It consists of knob-like cartilages in the mantle and corresponding depressions in the funnel. Unlike the closely allied genera Ocythoe and Tremoctopus, Argonauta species lack water pores.

== Names ==
The common names of the species come from Ancient Greece, where it was believed to traverse the ocean surface using two of its arms as sails: The Argonauts were the mythic sailors of the Argo, while the Greek ναυτίλος (nautílos) which literally means "sailor". In reality, argonauts swim by expelling water through their funnels as any other octopus does. The true nautilus was later named after their morphological resemblance to the argonaut, but belongs to a different cephalopod order, Nautilida.

== Description ==
=== Sexual dimorphism and reproduction ===
Argonauts exhibit extreme sexual dimorphism in size and lifespan. Females grow up to 10 cm and make shells up to 30 cm, while males rarely surpass 2 cm. The males mate only once in their short lifetime, whereas the females are iteroparous, capable of having offspring many times over the course of their lives. In addition, the females have been known since ancient times, while the males were described only in the late 19th century.

The males lack the dorsal tentacles used by the females to create their eggcases. The males use a modified arm, the hectocotylus, to transfer sperm to the female. For fertilization, the arm is inserted into the female's pallial cavity and then becomes detached from the male. The hectocotylus when found in females was originally described as a parasitic worm.

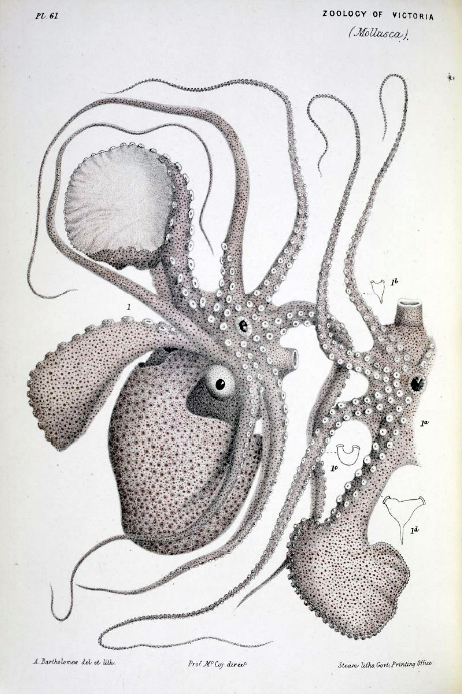
Mature female A. nodosa

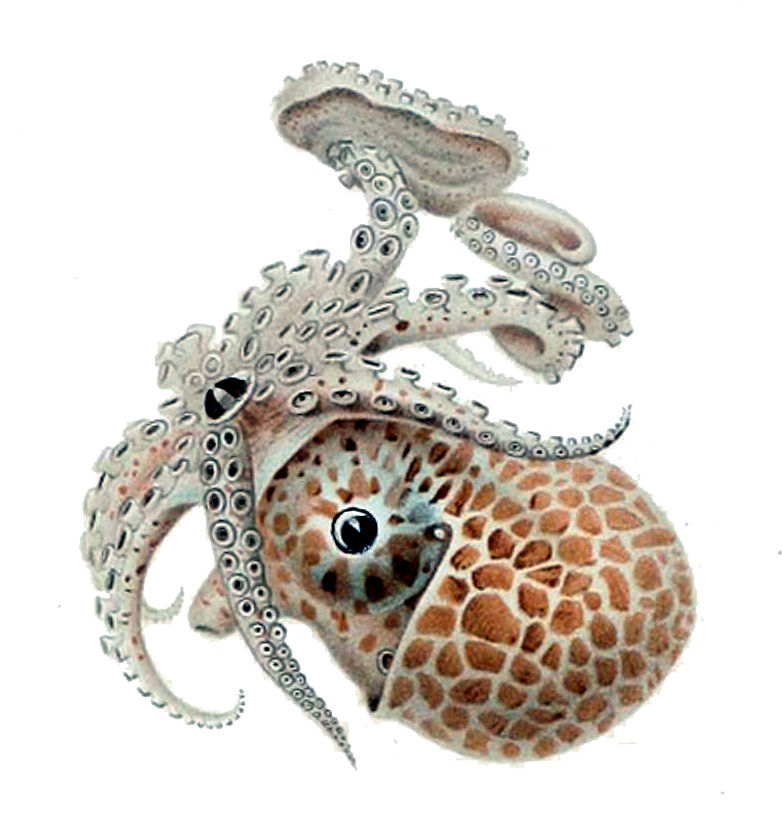
Juvenile female A. hians

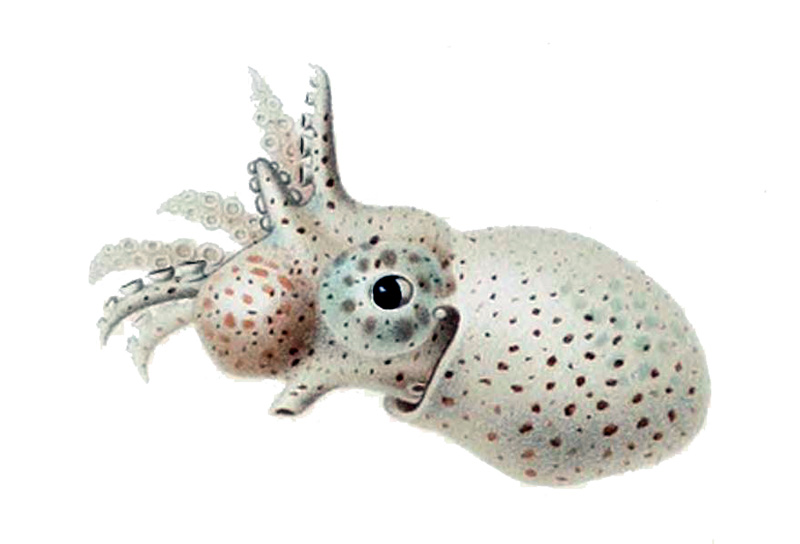
Immature male A. hians

=== Eggcase ===
Female argonauts produce a laterally compressed calcareous eggcase in which they reside. This "shell" has a double keel fringed by two rows of alternating tubercles. The sides are ribbed with the centre either flat or having winged protrusions. The eggcase curiously resembles the shells of extinct ammonites. It is secreted by the tips of the female's two greatly expanded dorsal tentacles (third left arms) before egg laying. After she deposits her eggs in the floating eggcase, the female takes shelter in it, often retaining the male's detached hectocotylus. She is usually found with her head and tentacles protruding from the opening, but she retreats deeper inside if disturbed. These ornate curved white eggcases are occasionally found floating on the sea, sometimes with the female argonaut clinging to it. It is not made of aragonite as most other shells are, but of calcite, with a three-layered structure and a higher proportion of magnesium carbonate (7%) than other cephalopod shells.

The eggcase contains a bubble of air that the animal captures at the surface of the water and uses for buoyancy, similarly to other shelled cephalopods, although it does not have a chambered phragmocone. Once thought to contribute to occasional mass strandings on beaches, the air bubble is under sophisticated control, evident from the behaviour of animals from which air has been removed under experimental diving conditions. This system to attain neutral buoyancy is effective only at the relatively shallow depths of the upper 10 meters of the water column. Young females with mantle lengths less than 9 millimeters are shell-less like the males, with both having been found in waters between 50–200 meters.

Most other octopuses lay eggs in caves; Neale Monks and C. Phil Palmer speculate that, before ammonites died out during the Cretaceous–Paleogene extinction event, the argonauts may have evolved to use discarded ammonite shells for their egg laying, eventually becoming able to mend the shells and perhaps make their own shells. However, this is uncertain and it is unknown whether this is the result of convergent evolution.

Argonauta argo is the largest species in the genus and also produces the largest eggcase, which may reach a length of 300 mm. The smallest species is Argonauta boettgeri, with a maximum recorded size of 67 mm.

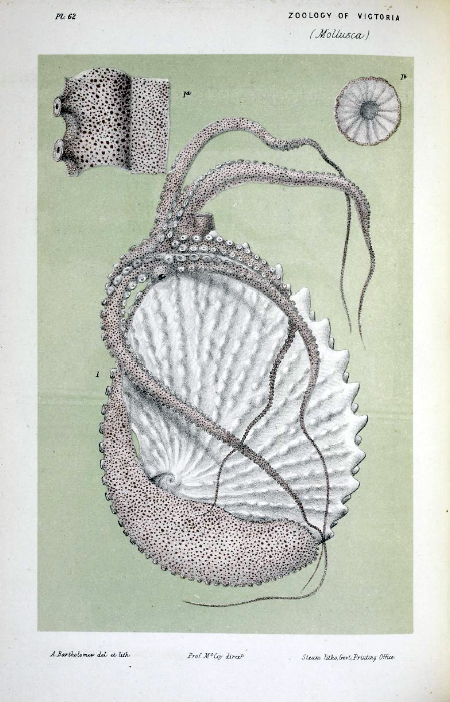
Female A. nodosa with its eggcase

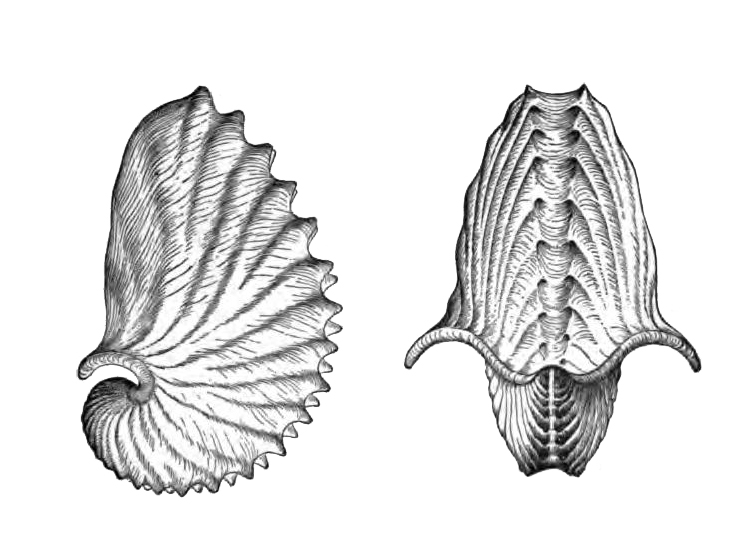
The eggcase of A. argo

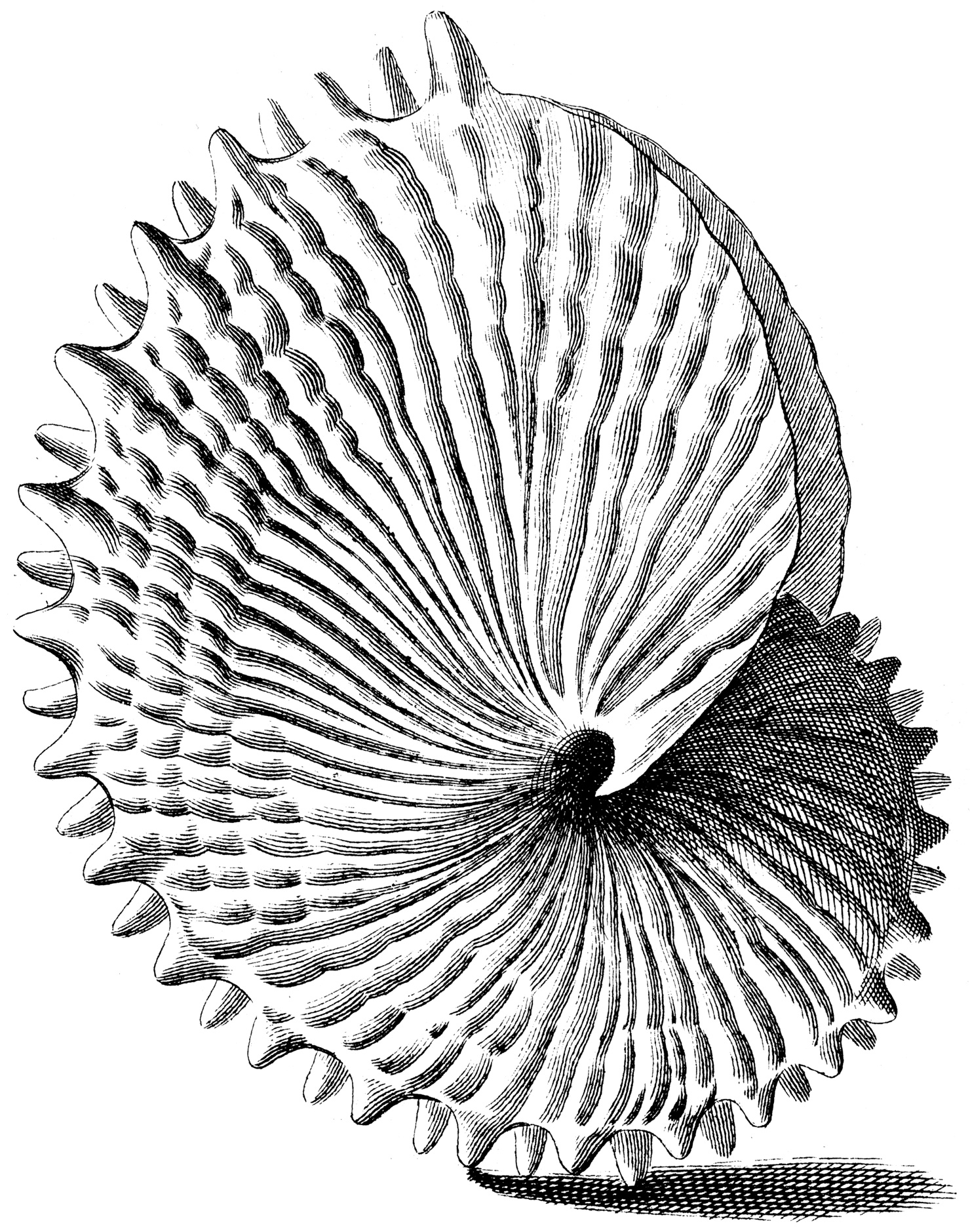
The eggcase of A. nodosa

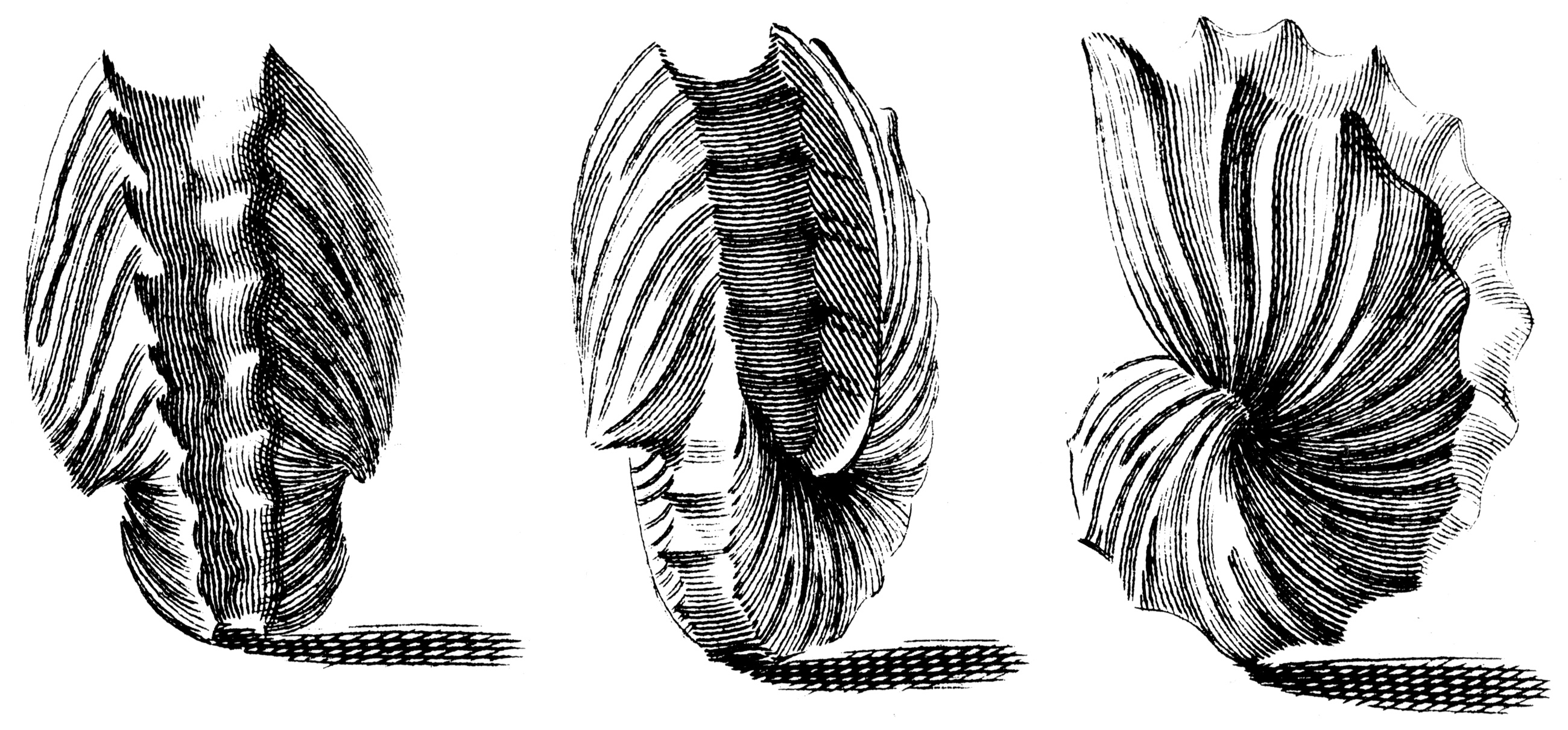
The eggcase of A. hians

=== Beak ===
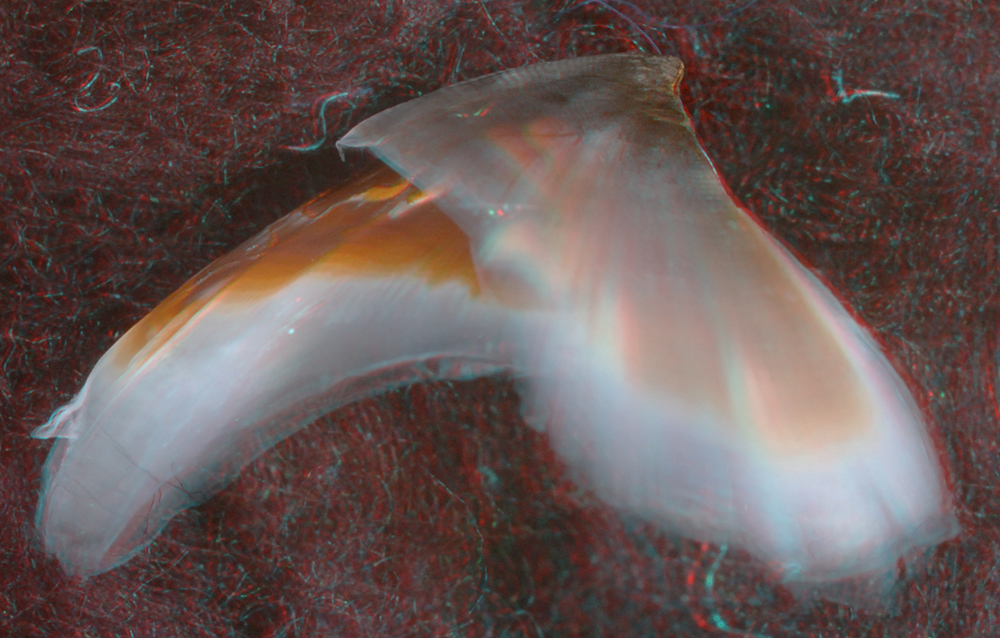
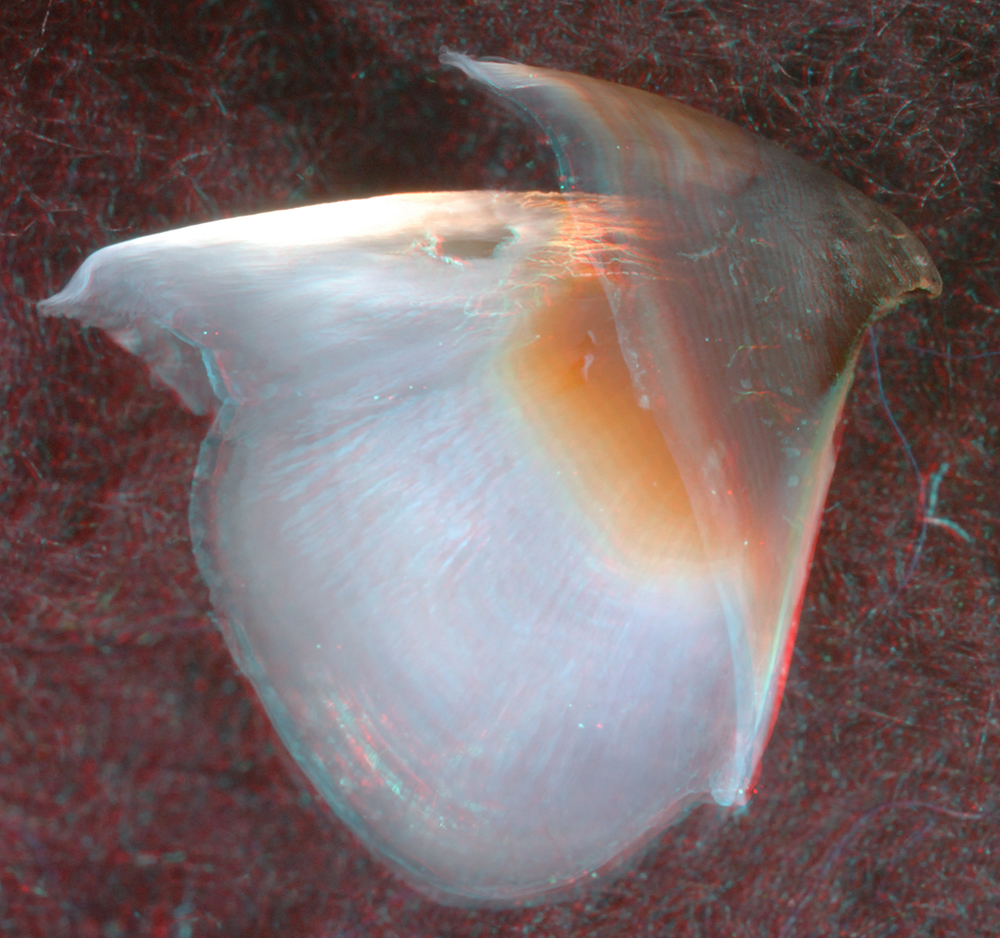
Lower (left) and upper beaks of female Argonauta argo (63 mm ML) in lateral view
3D red cyan glasses are recommended to view this image correctly.

The beaks of Argonauta species are distinctive, being characterised by a very small rostrum and a fold that runs to the lower edge or near the free corner. The rostrum is "pinched in" at the sides, making it much narrower than in other octopuses, with the exception of the closely allied monotypic genera Ocythoe and Vitreledonella. The jaw angle is curved and indistinct. Beaks have a sharp shoulder, which may or may not have posterior and anterior parts at different slopes. The hood lacks a notch and is very broad, flat, and low. The hood to crest ratio (f/g) is approximately 2.0–2.4 . The lateral wall of the beak has no notch near the wide crest. Argonaut beaks are most similar to those of Ocythoe tuberculata and Vitreledonella richardi, but differ in "leaning back" to a greater degree than the former and having a more curved jaw angle than the latter.

== Feeding and defense ==
Feeding mostly occurs during the day. Argonauts use tentacles to grab prey and drag it toward the mouth. It then bites the prey to inject it with venom from the salivary gland. They feed on small crustaceans, molluscs, jellyfish and salps. If the prey is shelled, the argonaut uses its radula to drill into the organism, then inject the toxin.

Argonauts are capable of altering their color. They can blend in with their surroundings to avoid predators. They also produce ink, which is ejected when the animal is being attacked. This ink paralyzes the olfaction of the attacker, providing time for the argonaut to escape. The female is also able to pull back the web covering of her shell, making a silvery flash, which may deter a predator from attacking.

Argonauts are preyed upon by tunas, billfishes, and dolphins. Shells and remains of argonauts have been recorded from the stomachs of Alepisaurus ferox and Coryphaena hippurus.

Male argonauts have been observed residing inside aggregate salps (Pegea socia), although little is known about this relationship.

== Classification ==
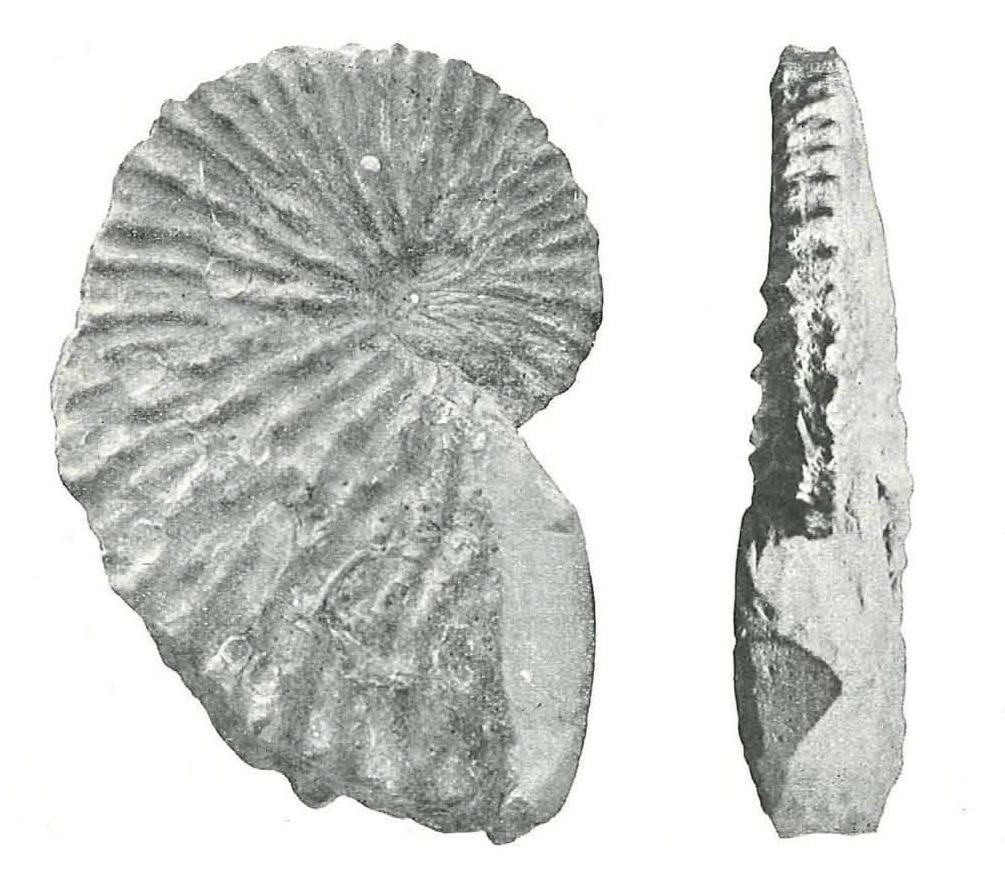
Fossilised eggcase of the extinct Miocene species Argonauta joanneus (lateral and keel views)

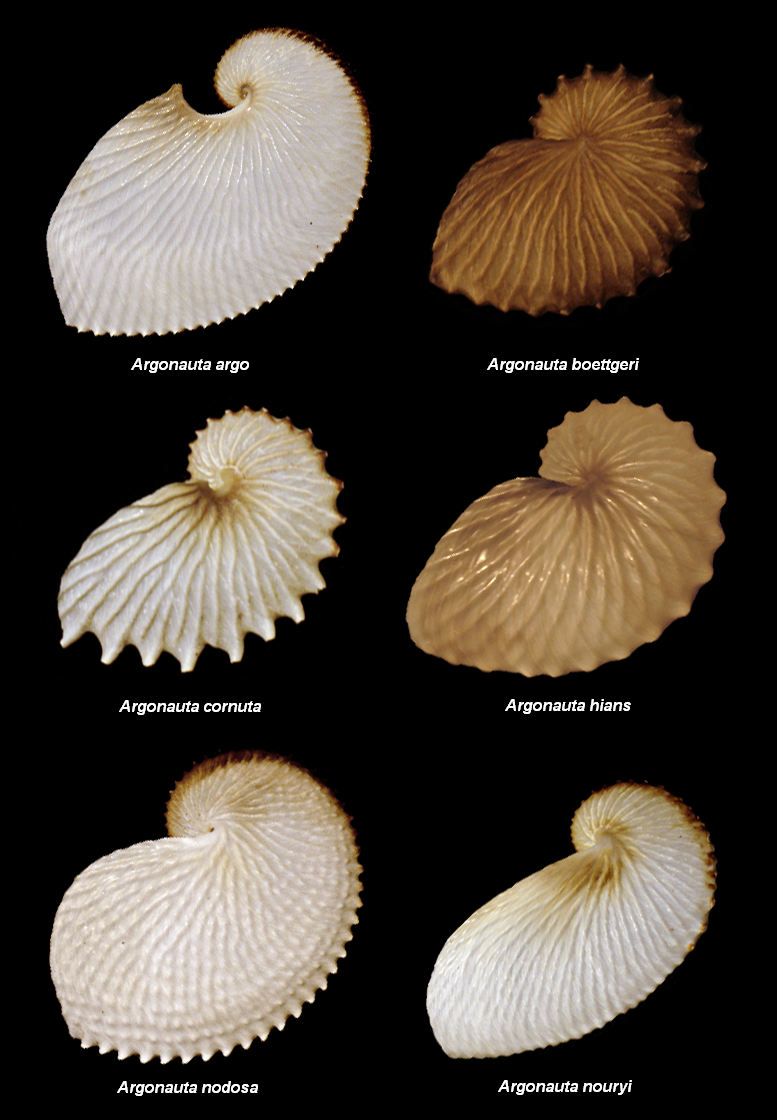
Eggcases of six extant Argonauta species

The genus Argonauta contains up to seven extant species. Several extinct species are also known.

Four extant species are widely considered valid:

- Argonauta argo Linnaeus, 1758
- Argonauta hians Lightfoot, 1786
- Argonauta nodosus Lightfoot, 1786
- Argonauta nouryi Lorois, 1852

Several additional taxa are either treated as valid species or regarded as nomina dubia:

- Argonauta boettgeri Maltzan, 1881
- Argonauta cornutus Conrad, 1854
- Argonauta pacificus Dall, 1871

A number of extinct species have also been described:

- †Argonauta absyrtus Martill & Barker, 2006
- †Argonauta biarmata Ponzi, 1876
- †Argonauta itoigawai Tomida, 1983
- †Argonauta joanneus Hilber, 1915
- †Argonauta oweri Fleming, 1945
- †Argonauta sismondai Bellardi, 1872
- †Argonauta tokunagai Yokoyama, 1913

The extinct species Obinautilus awaensis was originally assigned to Argonauta, but has since been transferred to the genus Obinautilus.

=== Dubious or uncertain taxa ===
The following taxa associated with the family Argonautidae are of uncertain taxonomic status:

Binomial name and author citation	Current systematic status	Type locality	Type repository
Argonauta arctica Fabricius, 1780	Undetermined	Unresolved; ?Tullukaurfak, Greenland	Unresolved
Argonauta bibula Röding, 1798	Undetermined	Unresolved	Unresolved
Argonauta compressa Blainville, 1826	Undetermined	Mer de Indes	Unresolved; [other Blainville types at MNHN] [not reported by Lu et al. (1995)]
Argonauta conradi Parkinson, 1856	Species of uncertain status [fide Robson (1932:200)]	"New Nantucket, Pacific Ocean"	Unresolved
Argonauta cornu Gmelin, 1791	Undetermined	Unresolved	Unresolved; LS?
Argonauta cymbium Linné, 1758	Non-cephalopod; foraminiferous shell [fide Von Martens (1867:103)		
Argonauta fragilis Parkinson, 1856	Species of uncertain status [fide Robson (1932:200)]	Not designated	Unresolved
Argonauta geniculata Gould, 1852	Species of uncertain status [fide Robson (1932:200)]	Near Sugarloaf Mountain, Rio de Janeiro, Brazil	Type not extant [fide Johnson (1964:32)]
Argonauta maxima Dall, 1871	Nomen nudum		
Argonauta navicula Lightfoot, 1786	Species dubium [fide Rehder (1967:11)]	Not designated	Unresolved
Argonauta rotunda Perry, 1811	Non-cephalopod; Carcinaria sp. [fide Robson (1932:201)]		
Argonauta rufa Owen, 1836	Incertae sedis [fide Robson (1932:181)]	"Indian seas" ["South Pacific ocean" fide Owen (1842:114)]	Unresolved; Museum of the Royal College of Surgeons? Holotype
Argonauta sulcata Lamarck, 1801	Nomen nudum		
Argonauta tuberculata f. aurita Von Martens, 1867	Undetermined	Unresolved	ZMB
Argonauta tuberculata f. mutica Von Martens, 1867	Undetermined	Coast of Brazil	ZMB Holotype
Argonauta tuberculata f. obtusangula Von Martens, 1867	Undetermined	Not designated	ZMB Syntypes
Argonauta vitreus Gmelin, 1791	Undetermined	Not designated	Unresolved; LS?
Octopus (Ocythoe) raricyathus Blainville, 1826	Undetermined [Argonauta?]	Not designated	MNHN Holotype; specimen not extant [fide Lu et al. (1995:323)]
Ocythoe punctata Say, 1819	Argonauta sp. [fide Robson (1929d:215)]	Atlantic Ocean near the North American coast (from stomach of dolphin)	Unresolved; ANSP? Holotype [not traced by Spamer and Bogan (1992)]
Tremoctopus hirondellei Joubin, 1895	Argonauta or Ocythoe [fide Thomas (1977:386)]	44°28′56″N 46°48′15″W (Atlantic Ocean)	MOM Holotype [station 151] [fide Belloc (1950:3)]

== In design ==
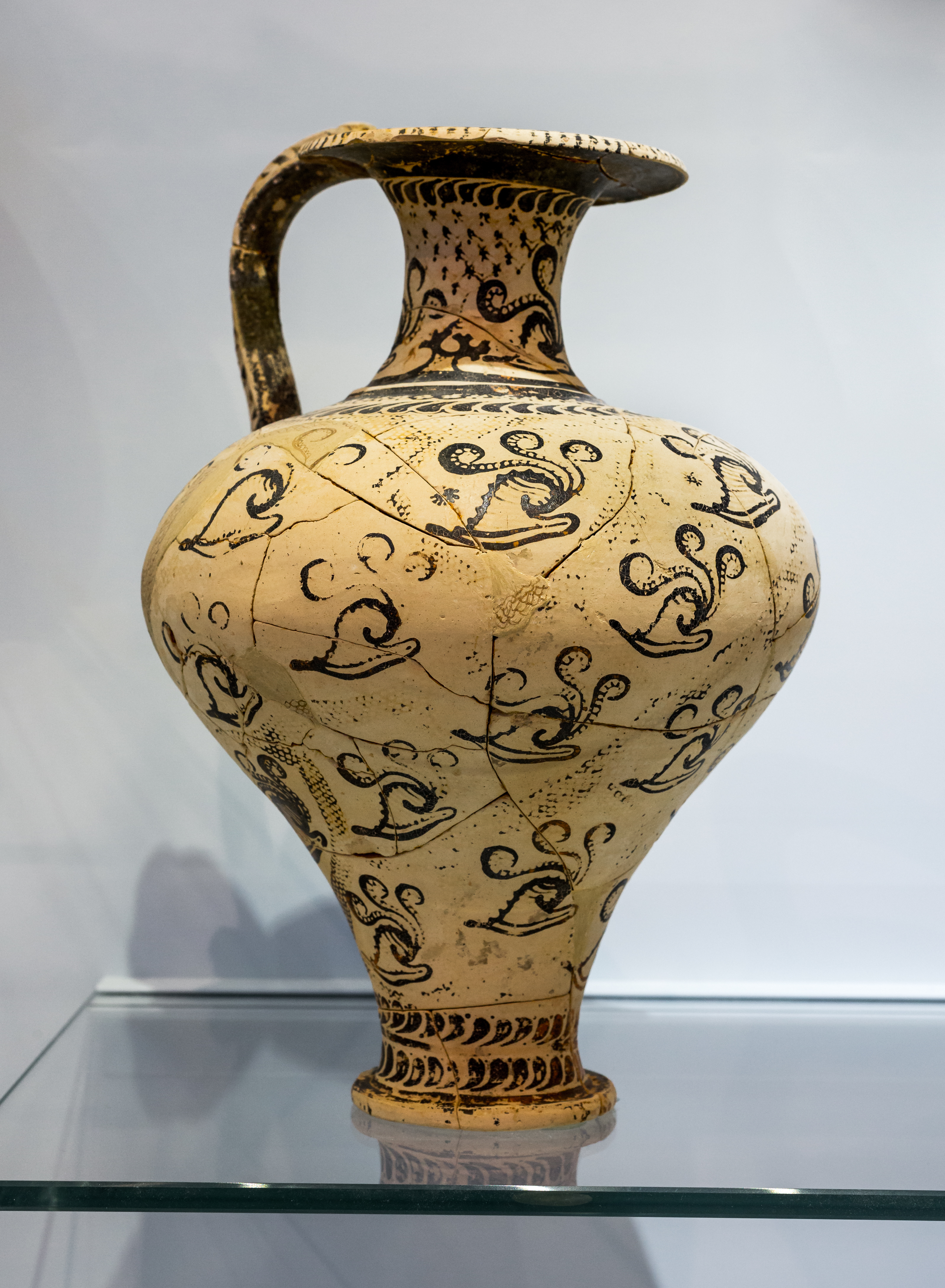
Repeating argonaut design on a Minoan ceramic

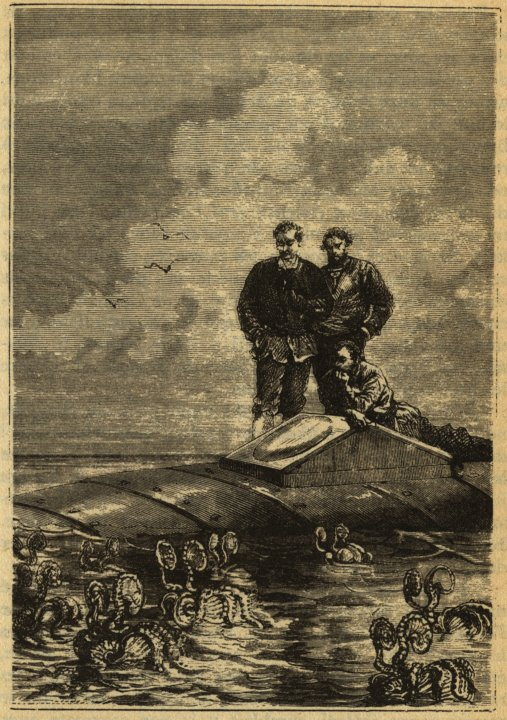
Argonauts surrounding the Nautilus, in Jules Verne's novel Twenty Thousand Leagues Under the Seas

The argonaut was the inspiration for a number of classical and modern art and decorative forms including use on pottery and architectural elements. Some early examples are found in Bronze Age Minoan art from Crete. A variation known as the double argonaut design was also found in Minoan jewelry. This design was also transposed and adapted in both gold and glass in contemporary Mycenaean contexts, as seen both at Mycenae and the Tholos at Volo.

== In literature and etymology ==
- Argonauts are featured in Twenty Thousand Leagues Under the Seas, noted for their ability to use their tentacles as sails. Although it is false natural history, this was a long-standing and widespread myth, apparently originating with Aristotle.
- A female argonaut is also described in Marianne Moore's poem "The Paper Nautilus".
- "Argonauta" is the name of a chapter in Anne Morrow Lindbergh's Gift from the Sea.
- Paper nautiluses were caught in the novel The Swiss Family Robinson.
- Argonauts gave their name to an Arabidopsis thaliana mutation and by extension to Argonaute proteins.
