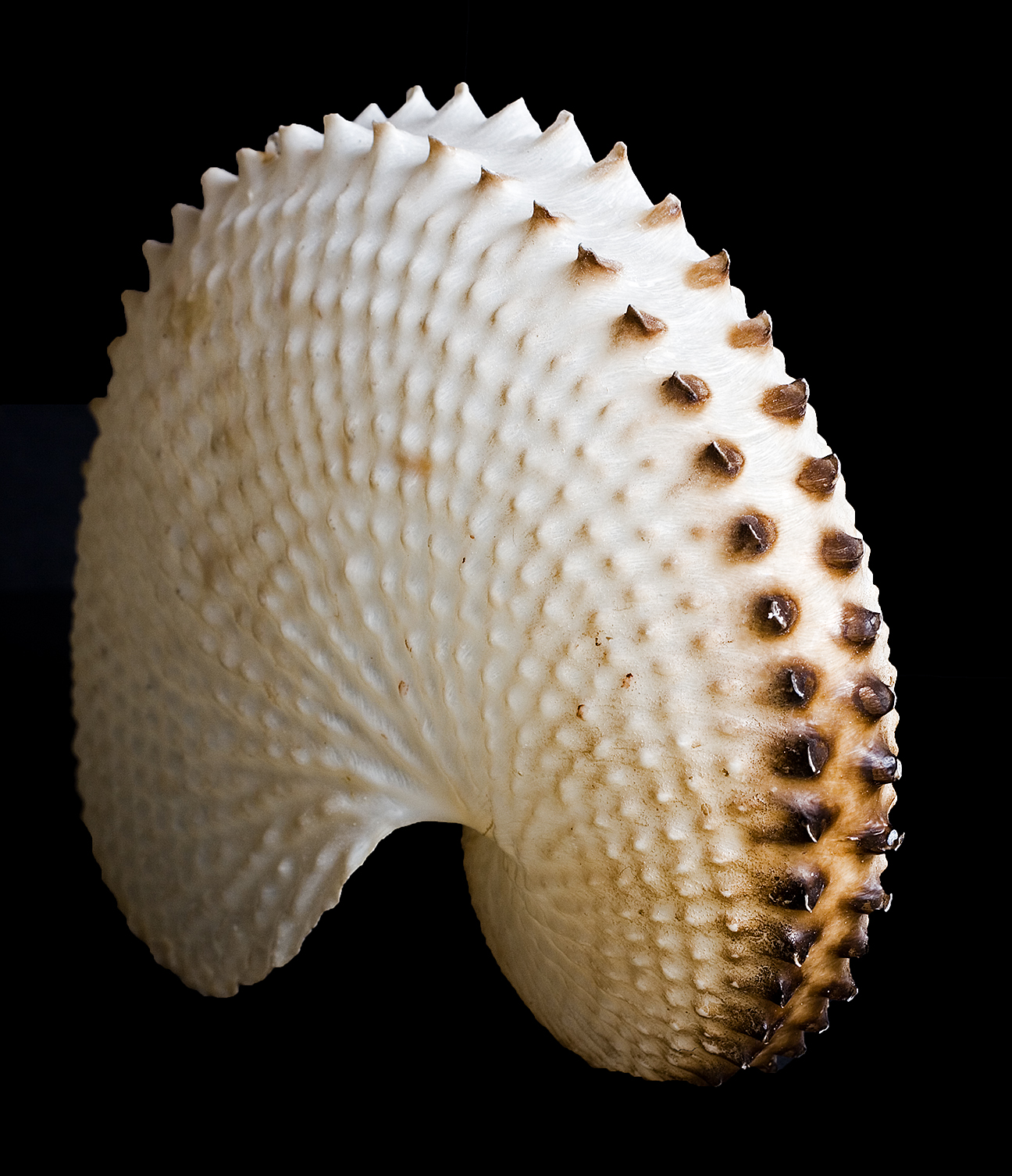
- Eggcase of Argonauta nodosa, showing the derived double keel of the genus

Scientific classification
- Kingdom: Animalia
- Phylum: Mollusca
- Class: Cephalopoda
- Order: Octopoda
- Superfamily: Argonautoidea
- Family: Argonautidae; Cantraine, 1841

Genera
- Argonauta †Izumonauta †Kapal †Mizuhobaris ?†Obinautilus

= Argonautidae =

Argonautidae Temporal range: Oligocene – Recent

Family of molluscs

The Argonautidae are a family of pelagic cephalopods that inhabit tropical and temperate oceans of the world. The family encompasses the modern paper nautiluses of the genus Argonauta along with several extinct genera of shelled octopods. Though argonauts are derived from benthic octopuses, they have evolved to depart the sea floor and live their life-cycle in the open seas.

The family is characterised by brittle white shells constructed by the females, but which the dwarf male argonauts lack. These shells are primarily egg-cases, and are not attached to the body of the female. Paper nautiluses are often found washed up on beaches and are valued for their delicate beauty. The shell also plays the role of a buoyancy device, which the female controls by varying the amount of gulped air. All eggcases possessing nodes, ribs, and a double keel, with the exception of those of fossil Kapal batavus, have been assigned to Argonauta. Eggcases lacking these morphological features have been placed in the other Argonautidae genera.

Fossil Argonautidae eggcases have been described from Japan, New Zealand, Sumatra, Europe, and California.
