= Paradoxus (disambiguation) =

Paradoxus is a genus of moths of the family Yponomeutidae.

Paradoxus may also refer to:

== Biology ==
It is used for species with unexpected features.

- Brachychiton paradoxus, a species of tree
- Cyrtodactylus paradoxus, a species of gecko
- Dilong paradoxus, a genus tyrannosauroid dinosaur
- Dissocarpus paradoxus, a species of shrub
- Helianthus paradoxus, a species of sunflower
- Hippocampus paradoxus, a species of seahorse
- Idiosepius paradoxus, a species of squid
- Lactarius paradoxus, a species of mushroom
- Lepidocyrtus paradoxus, a species of springtail
- Leucopaxillus paradoxus, a species of fungus
- Liaoningosaurus paradoxus, a genus of ankylosaurian dinosaurs
- Merluccius paradoxus, a species of fish
- Menemerus paradoxus, a species of spider
- Metoecus paradoxus, a species of beetle
- Metopides paradoxus, a species of beetle
- Ornithorhyncus paradoxus, a species of platypus
- Paradoxus osyridellus, a species of moth
- Paropta paradoxus, a species of moth
- Platerodrilus paradoxus, a species of beetle
- Saccharomyces paradoxus, a species of yeast
- Solenodon paradoxus, a species of solenodon
- Solenostomus paradoxus, a species of fish
- Variovorax paradoxus, a species of bacteria
- Xanthostemon paradoxus, a species of tree

== Medicine ==
- Pulsus paradoxus, a blood pressure drop during inspiration

== See also ==
- Paradox
- Paradoxa (disambiguation)
- Paradoxia, a species of green algae
- Paradoxides, a genus of trilobite
