= Idiosepius picteti =

Conservation status
- Data Deficient (IUCN 3.1)

Scientific classification
- Kingdom: Animalia
- Phylum: Mollusca
- Class: Cephalopoda
- Order: Idiosepida
- Family: Idiosepiidae
- Genus: Idiosepius
- Species: I. picteti

Binomial name
- Idiosepius picteti (Joubin, 1894)

Synonyms
- Loligo picteti Joubin, 1894

Species of mollusc

Idiosepius picteti is a species of pygmy squid native to the Indo-Pacific waters off eastern Indonesia.

I. picteti grows to 17 mm (0.67 in) in mantle length.

The type specimen was collected near Ambon Island in Indonesia and is held at the Muséum d'Histoire Naturelle in Geneva.
