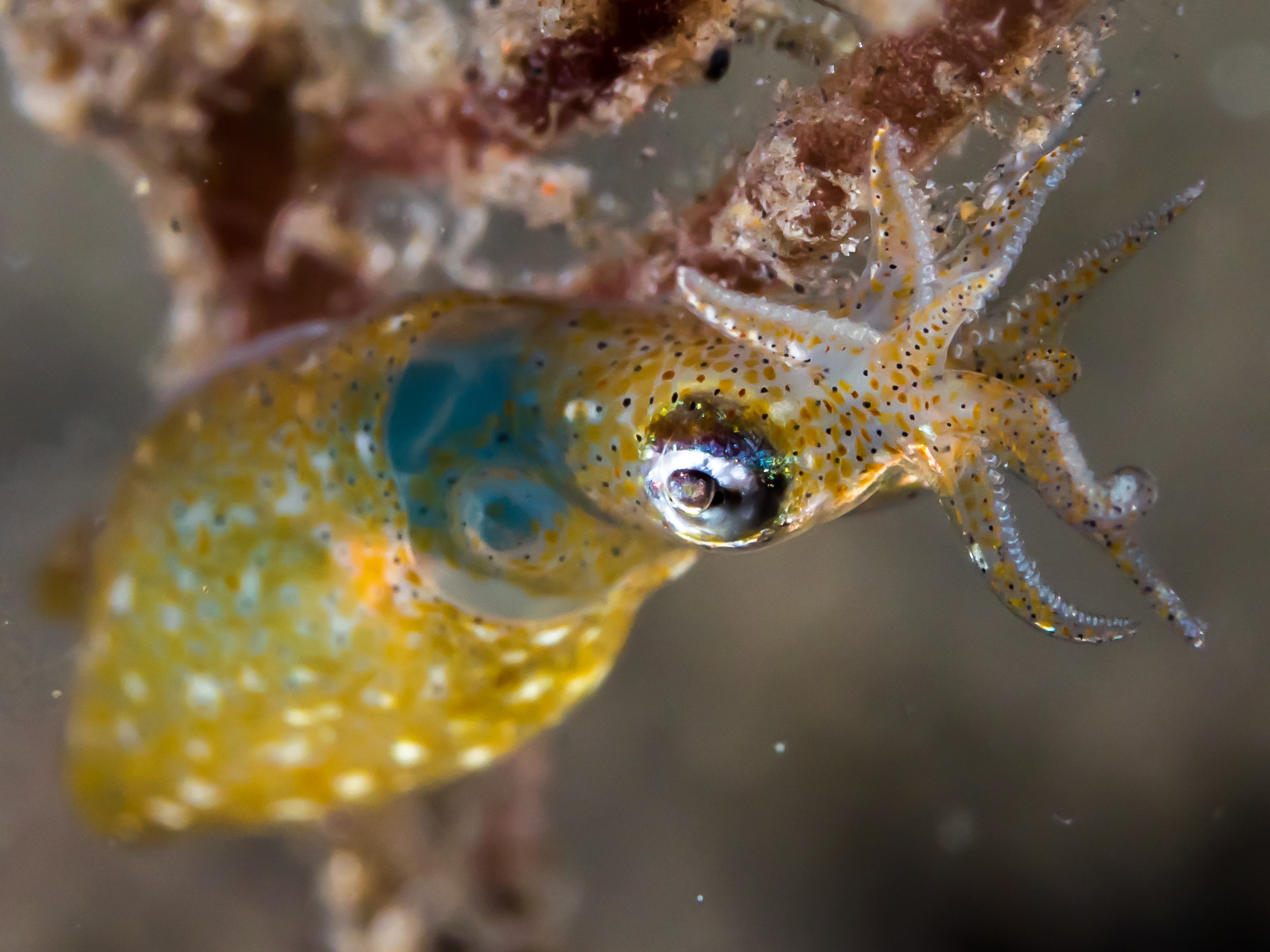
- Adult
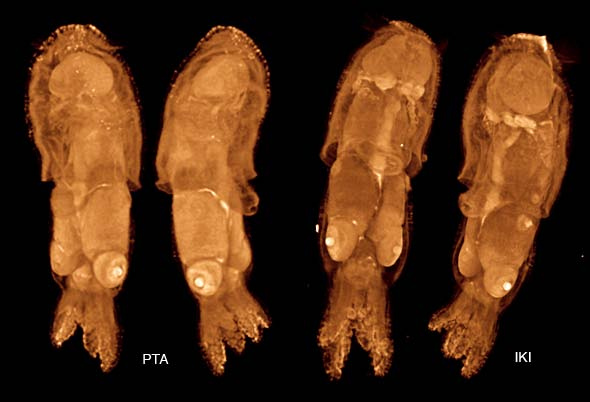
- Hatchlings (c. 2 mm long) stained with phosphotungstic acid (left) and Lugol's iodine (right)

Conservation status
- Data Deficient (IUCN 3.1)

Scientific classification
- Kingdom: Animalia
- Phylum: Mollusca
- Class: Cephalopoda
- Order: Idiosepida
- Family: Idiosepiidae
- Genus: Idiosepius
- Species: I. pygmaeus

Binomial name
- Idiosepius pygmaeus Steenstrup, 1881

= Idiosepius pygmaeus =

Species of mollusc

Idiosepius pygmaeus, also known as the two-toned pygmy squid or tropical pygmy squid, is a species of pygmy squid native to the Indo-Pacific. It resides in the South China Sea, Japan, Philippines, Palau, Indonesia, the Northern Mariana Islands, as well as northern and northeastern Australia. The squid traditionally inhabits shallow, inshore waters.

I. pygmaeus weighs 0.00033 g upon hatching and increases in weight to 0.175 g as it reaches maturity in 50 days (1260 degree days). The squid prefers waters at a temperature of 25.2 °C. Growth rate has been calculated as 12.55 and physiological growth rate as 0.498.

I. pygmaeus grows to a mantle length of 20 mm.

This species eats glass shrimp (Acetes sibogae australis) in the laboratory.

The type specimen was collected in the South China Sea (04°20′N 107°20′E) and is deposited at the Zoologisk Museum of Kobenhavns Universitet in Copenhagen.

== Habitat ==
I. pygmaeus is heavily concentrated in seagrass meadows. They are known to attach to seagrass using a special organ that supports adhesion. However, human activities have disturbed seagrass meadows. This habitat used for shelter by organisms such as Idiosepius is threatened.
