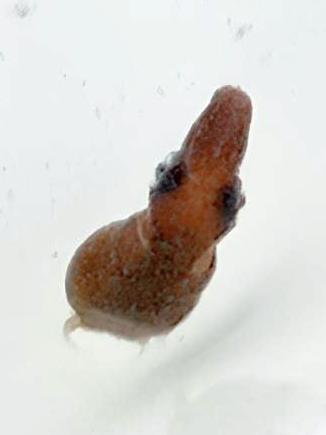

Scientific classification
- Kingdom: Animalia
- Phylum: Mollusca
- Class: Cephalopoda
- Order: Idiosepida
- Family: Idiosepiidae
- Genus: Idiosepius
- Species: I. hallami

Binomial name
- Idiosepius hallami Reid & Strugnell, 2018

= Hallam's pygmy squid =

Species of mollusc

Hallam's pygmy squid, known formally as Idiosepius hallami, is a species of bobtail squid in the family Idiosepius. Full-grown adults reach a maximum length of ~2 centimeters, and the species has been observed off the coast of Australia.
