= Idiosepius thailandicus =

Conservation status
- Data Deficient (IUCN 3.1)

Scientific classification
- Kingdom: Animalia
- Phylum: Mollusca
- Class: Cephalopoda
- Order: Idiosepida
- Family: Idiosepiidae
- Genus: Idiosepius
- Species: I. thailandicus

Binomial name
- Idiosepius thailandicus Chotiyaputta, Okutani & Chaitiamvong, 1991

Species of mollusc

Idiosepius thailandicus, also known as the thai pygmy squid, is a species of bobtail squid native to the Indo-Pacific waters off Thailand. The extent of this species' distribution is still to be determined and records of Idiosepius dwarf squid away from Thailand, south to Indonesia and north to Japan, may be attributable to this species.

Females grow to 10 mm in mantle length (ML), while males are not known to exceed 7 mm ML.

The type specimen was collected in the Gulf of Thailand and is deposited at the Marine Fisheries Division in Bangkok.

In the Gulf of Thailand off eastern Thailand Idiosepius thailandicus was recorded among seaweed in the littoral zone in Rayong Province and in a mangrove habitats in Chanthaburi Province. In mangrove habitats the squid adhered their eggs to the roots of the mangrove. In the Andaman Sea, this species occurred in subtidal seagrass beds near the mouth of estuaries lined with mangroves and on sand bars which were interspersed with rocks. In these habitats the eggs were attached to the underside of blades of seagrasses. These squids and their relatives have a glue gland on their dorsal body surface that they use to adhere to submerged vegetation and other objects. Their life cycle is thought to include a juvenile pelagic stage.

Idiosepius thailandicus is classified as Data Deficient by the IUCN as its exact distribution is unknown and no assessments have been made of its population size or population trends. The seagrass beds which form an important part of this species habitat are under threat and if, as may be the case, this species extends north to Japan then the seagrass beds there have been severely negatively impacted by human activities.
