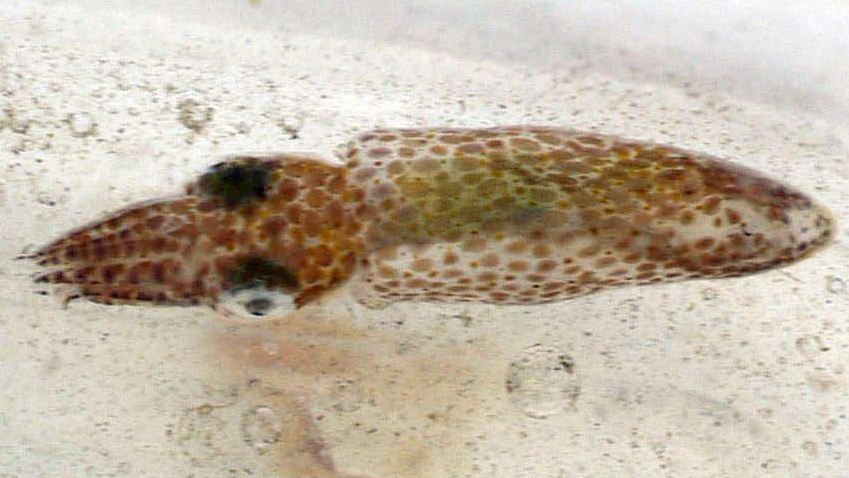

Conservation status
- Data Deficient (IUCN 3.1)

Scientific classification
- Kingdom: Animalia
- Phylum: Mollusca
- Class: Cephalopoda
- Order: Idiosepida
- Family: Idiosepiidae
- Genus: Idiosepius
- Species: I. paradoxus

Binomial name
- Idiosepius paradoxus (Ortmann, 1888)

Synonyms
- Microteuthis paradoxus Ortmann, 1888; Idiosepius pygmaeus paradoxus (Ortmann, 1888)

= Idiosepius paradoxus =

Species of mollusc

Idiosepius paradoxus, also known as the northern pygmy squid, is a species of pygmy squid native to the western Pacific Ocean. This species can be found inhabiting shallow, inshore waters around central China, South Korea, and Japan.

== Appearance ==
This species is part of the smallest known squid genus, growing only to 16 mm (0.63 in) in mantle length. Females tend to be larger than males, and the presence of nidamental glands for secretion of egg jelly differentiates them from males. Males can be identified by the presence of a singular white testis found posteriorly in the body. Both sexes have a unique organ found on their dorsal mantle for binding themselves to a substrate, such as seagrass. The type specimen was collected off Kadsiyama in Tokyo Bay and is conserved at the Musee Zoologique in Strasbourg.

== Distribution and habitat ==
I. paradoxus is found farthest North of all the species in genus Idiosepius. The distribution of this species includes the waters off South Korea and northern Australia, as well as the Japanese islands of Honshu, Kyushu, and southern Hokkaido. In these locations, this squid can be found in the demersal zone of the ocean in subtropical climates. It resides in algae, seagrass, and seaweed. Based on season within its distribution, there are two recorded life histories. Small type squid hatch between March and July and spawn between June and September, while large type squid hatch in the summer and spawn during the next spring, and have longer reproductive seasons.

== Diet ==
This species feeds mainly on small fish, shrimp, and other organisms. They can prey on larger fish, but may not be able to fully digest all of the flesh. Just as they utilize external fertilization, these squid can externally digest their food as well. Anatomically, they possess both a beak and a buccal mass. The buccal mass is used to break through hard exoskeletons, secrete digestive fluids, and then remove the softened flesh of prey. With small prey, the beak is not needed for biting or severing any body parts. There is also evidence of a sex-specific cognitive bias in I. paradoxus, such that females more often than males overestimate the size of prey they will be able to successfully attack.

== Reproduction and sexual selection ==
=== Copulation and spawning ===
I. paradoxus mates through a polyandrous system, in which females copulate with numerous males. The focus of existing research seems to be on female promiscuity, with little information on how many partners are acquired per male. Males do not exhibit precopulatory behaviors, such as male-male competition, so a male and female will mate upon finding one another. The male grasps the female in a head-to-head position using his right hectocotylus, which he also uses to point towards her arm crown externally. He then uses his left hectocotylus to grasp spermatophores containing sperm from his funnel, post ejaculation. The spermatophores become spermatangia through an eversion reaction involving the ejaculatory apparatus and cement body, and are then placed on the female's body directed by the groove on the right hectocotylus. The sperm become activated by seawater, and will swim to the seminal receptacle around the female's buccal mass on the ventral mantle, where they will be stored until spawning and fertilization. In this species, sperm form swarms when swimming from spermatangia to the seminal receptacle. The receptacle does not become full until about 8 copulations, after which no more sperm can be held until spawning has occurred.

The female can mate with multiple males and retain sperm from each before adhering to a substrate such as seagrass to spawn. Once ready, the female releases egg jelly from her nidamental gland, out her funnel, and into her arms, followed by a single egg that she attaches to the substrate. During attachment, she covers the egg with her buccal membrane so that sperm can be passed from the seminal receptacle to the egg through individualized external fertilization. This process is repeated for multiple rows of eggs. Each egg is wrapped in 8–10 gelatinous layers, and these may function in protection against small microorganisms. Females may spawn several times in this fashion from a full seminal receptacle.

=== Cryptic female choice ===
I. paradoxus has been used in the study of cryptic female choice due to male sperm transfer to an external location on the female's body, making this process more easily observable than in other species. Once the female has mated, either with one male or several, she can use her buccal mass to pull spermatangia off her body individually to get rid of as many as she chooses. By removing spermatangia, she is choosing which male(s) will have greater opportunity to sire her offspring. In this way, postcopulatory mechanisms in this species can act as sexual selection for certain traits in males.

There is evidence from multiple studies that smaller males are preferred by females, meaning females remove more spermatangia from larger males. However, whether females prefer longer or shorter copulations is debated. Some evidence points towards preference for longer copulating males, while other evidence shows preference for decreased copulation times. It has been observed that sperm transfer to the seminal receptacle from the spermatangium must occur within 24 hours, as almost all spermatangia in the species discharged their spermatozoa within 24 hours. In the beginning, rapid sperm discharge is observed, but after 5 minutes it becomes intermittent. A possible explanation for female preference of small and fast copulating males could be that predation risk is decreased with shorter time spent in copula and less attention drawn with smaller body size. Predation could actually act as a selection pressure for increased postcopulatory versus precopulatory behaviors in I. paradoxus, as postcopulatory behaviors like cryptic female choice may draw less attention and be easier to exhibit when also under threat of predation. In addition, there is evidence that cryptic female choice could be adaptive when comparing populations experiencing high versus low predation: the population more often exposed to predation may be able to carry out cryptic female choice as usual without decreasing the behavior, unlike in populations which are not used to predation.

While females are able to exhibit choice, males engage in behaviors to give their sperm the best chance of making it to the female's seminal receptacle. During copulation, males have been observed directing their spermatangia by the right hectocotylus to different locations on the female's body (such as different arm crown bases) per spermatophore ejaculation. This is thought to reduce the number of spermatangia removed by the female from a particular male, as their spermatangia are spread to multiple locations that the female may be unaware of.
