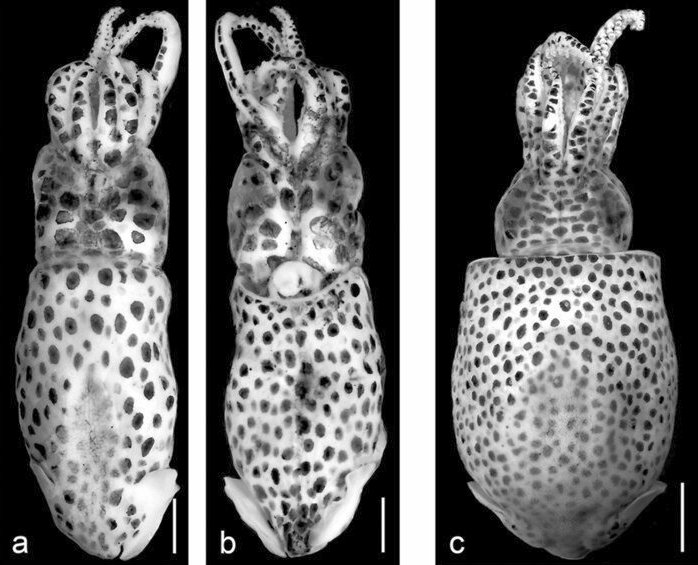

Scientific classification
- Kingdom: Animalia
- Phylum: Mollusca
- Class: Cephalopoda
- Order: Idiosepida
- Family: Idiosepiidae
- Genus: Idiosepius
- Species: I. kijimuna

Binomial name
- Idiosepius kijimuna A. Reid, N. Sato, Jolly & Strugnell, 2023

= Idiosepius kijimuna =

Species of bobtail squid

Idiosepius kijimuna, known as the Ryukyuan pygmy squid, is a species of bobtail squid in the family Idiosepiidae. The species is named after Kijimuna, short, red-haired forest fairies from Japanese folklore said to live in the banyan trees of Okinawa Island. The species is native to the Ryukyu Islands of Japan.

== Description ==
The species features some red markings. They have a maximum length of 1.2 centimeters.

== Habitat ==
Land use is a threat to the species.
