= Idiosepius minimus =

Conservation status
- Data Deficient (IUCN 3.1)

Scientific classification
- Kingdom: Animalia
- Phylum: Mollusca
- Class: Cephalopoda
- Order: Idiosepida
- Family: Idiosepiidae
- Genus: Idiosepius
- Species: I. minimus

Binomial name
- Idiosepius minimus (Orbigny, 1835)

Synonyms
- Cranchia minima d'Orbigny, 1835; Idiosepius biserialis Voss, 1962; Idiosepius macrocheir Voss, 1962

Species of mollusc

Idiosepius minimus is a species of bobtail squid native to the "coast of Africa" where it occurs in shallow, inshore waters. Specimens collected under the junior synonyms I. biserialis and I. macrocheir were described from Mozambique. Since then, the further collecting effort off Mozambique has seen additional specimens gained. As a result it has been inferred that this species has a relatively restricted distribution since Idiosepius has not been recorded elsewhere in Africa.

I. minimus grows to 15 mm in mantle length. Recent specimens were collected using handnetts over beds of the seagrasses Zostera and Cymodocea. The dwarf squids in the Idiosepiidae possess a glue gland on the dorsal surface of the body which they can use to adhere vegetation and other submerged objects. These small squid are typically predators of crustaceans, the females stick their eggs onto seaweed or seagrass blades and their life cycle is thought to include a pelagic planktonic stage.

The type locality of I. minimus is not designated. The type specimen was originally deposited at the Muséum National d'Histoire Naturelle in Paris, but is no longer extant.

The validity of I. minimus has been questioned.
