= Paradoxa =

Paradoxa may refer to:

- Paradoxa (fungus), a genus of fungi in the family Tuberaceae
- Paradoxa, a junior synonym of the sea snail genus Pradoxa
- Animalia Paradoxa, a list of animals which are mythical, magical or otherwise suspected not to exist, in editions 1 to 5 of Carl Linnaeus's seminal work Systema Naturae

== See also ==
- Paradoxia, a genus of green algae
