= Metopides =

Scientific classification
- Kingdom: Animalia
- Phylum: Arthropoda
- Class: Insecta
- Order: Coleoptera
- Suborder: Polyphaga
- Infraorder: Cucujiformia
- Family: Cerambycidae
- Tribe: Lamiini
- Genus: Metopides

Genus of beetles

Metopides is a genus of longhorn beetles of the subfamily Lamiinae, containing the following species:

- Metopides occipitalis Pascoe, 1866
- Metopides paradoxus Hüdepohl, 1992
