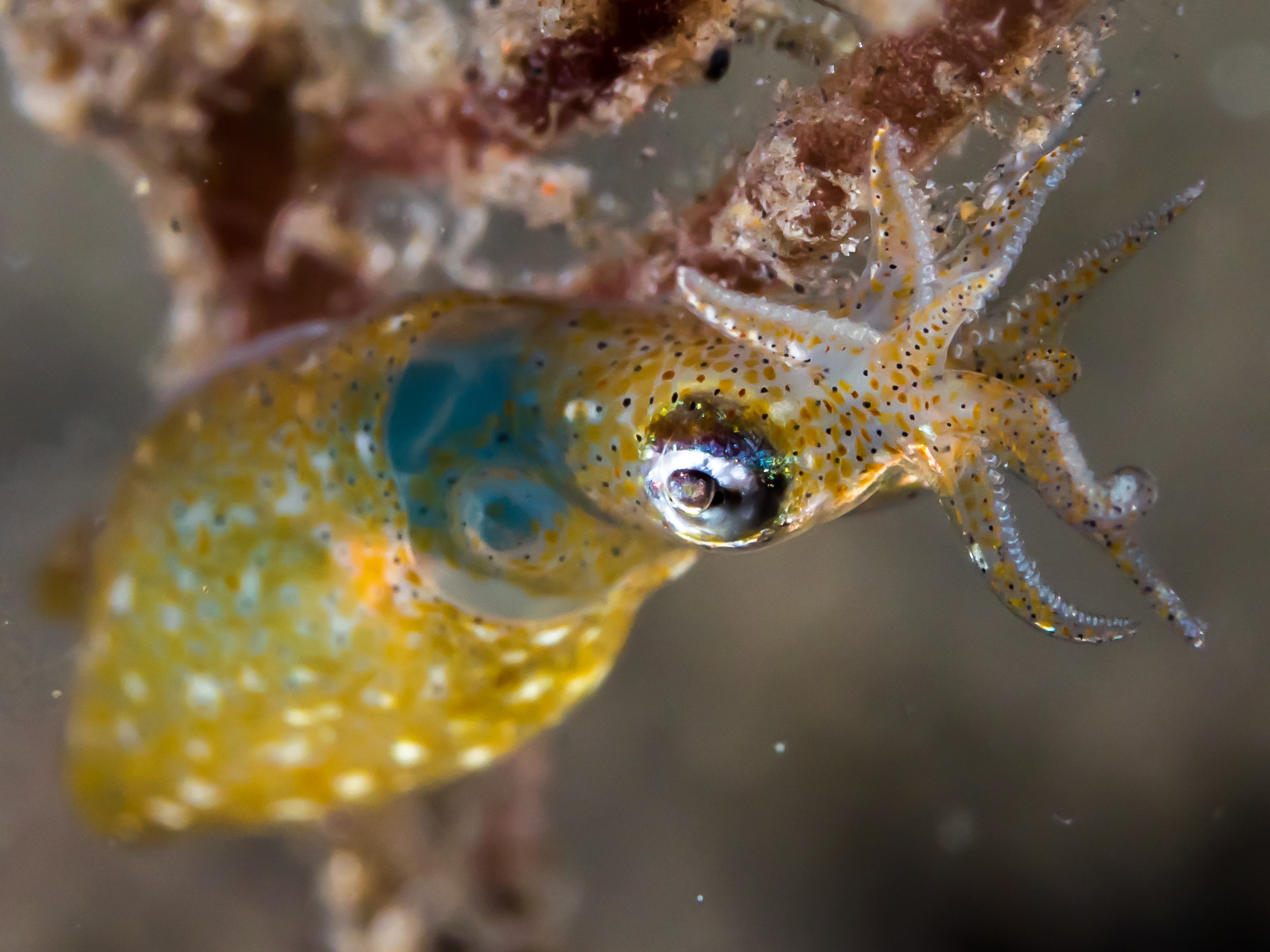
- Idiosepius pygmaeus

Scientific classification
- Kingdom: Animalia
- Phylum: Mollusca
- Class: Cephalopoda
- Order: Idiosepida
- Family: Idiosepiidae
- Genus: Idiosepius; Steenstrup, 1881

Type species
- Idiosepius pygmaeus Steenstrup, 1881

Synonyms
- Microteuthis Ortmann, 1888; Naefidium Grimpe, 1920

= Idiosepius =

Genus of molluscs

Idiosepius is a genus of squids in the family Idiosepiidae. Most well known for their incredibly tiny size, these squids range from 10 to 18 mm (0.39 to 0.75 in) in adult specimens. Members of this genus are of no interest to commercial fisheries. Idiosepius are found primarily in tropical and temperate waters throughout the Indo-Pacific, often found in association with seagrass and mangrove roots.

== Anatomy ==
Idiosepius have 8 tentacles and 2 arms and have an adhesive organ located on the dorsal mantle side at the posterior end between the fins. Pygmy squid brain structures and nervous system are comparable to other squids and octopuses but they have a more developed optical tract. The beaks of Idiosepius show small toothlike structures, a genus specific feature which can be useful in distinguishing Idiosepius species.

== Species ==
The following species are recognised in the genus Idiosepius:

- Idiosepius hallami Reid & Strugnell, 2018
- Idiosepius kijimuna Reid, Sato, Jolly & Strugnell, 2023
- Idiosepius minimus (d'Orbigny in Férussac & d'Orbigny, 1835)
- Idiosepius paradoxus (Ortmann, 1888)
- Idiosepius picteti (Joubin, 1894)
- Idiosepius pygmaeus Steenstrup, 1881
- Idiosepius thailandicus Chotiyaputta, Okutani & Chaitiamvong, 1991

== Phylogeny ==
The major morphological characteristic that separates Idiosepius from other cephalopods is its adhesive organ. Idiosepius phylogenetic placement is disputed with early analysis placing Idiosepius as sister taxa to Teuthida and recent analysis placing Idiosepius in Order Sepiolida. Species within Idiosepius have been morphologically categorized by the shape of the male hectocotylus and arrangement of tentacle suckers. Molecular analysis has separated Idiosepius species into 4 clades although there has been debate about the number of species of Idiosepius. Molecular and morphological analysis supported the hypotheses that I. thailandicus and I. macrocheir were junior synonyms of I. biserialis, however, I. biserialis and I. macrocheir are now considered junior synonyms of Idiosepius minimus.

== Reproduction ==
Most reproductive research has been on female pygmy squids. They are able to spawn multiple batches of eggs without a decrease in quality as they are deposited, and have a preference for spawning in no or low light. A female has the ability to allocate more or less energy to reproductive tissues and the development of eggs depending on the season, which causes slower body growth but larger gonads during colder temperature spawning periods. Cross mating has been observed in I. minimus and I. thailandicus. Male and female Idiosepius reproductive structures and organs are the same or similar to most other types of squids.

=== Reproductive behaviours ===
Pygmy squids do not display monogamous behaviors such as pairing up or protecting a mate. Instead, they will copulate with many other pygmy squids. Mating patterns vary between species and involve the orientation of the male and female squid (with one or both partners floating above a substrate or one or both partners adhering to a substrate), the posture of each partner (either vertical or horizontal), and the colour patterns of each partner. 4 unique patterns have been observed in I. thailandicus and 3 have been observed in I. minimus. Idiosepius species differ in how males hold onto females and with which appendages they use to pass spermatophores during copulation. Females also have the ability to remove spermatophores received from males and exhibit a preference for smaller, faster copulating males for reproduction. There is less variation in spawning patterns among species, females either adhere upside down to a substrate to lay eggs, or float near a substrate and swim closer to lay eggs.

== Growth and development ==
Idiosepius eggs range from 0.87 to 0.91 mm (0.032 to 0.036 in) in length and 0.67 to 0.72 mm (0.026 to 0.028 in) in width and the amount of egg layers varies among species. Embryo development typically take less than a month depending on the species and their mortality and gestation period depend on water temperature. Warm temperatures of 30 °C (86 °F) had no mortalities and the shortest gestation periods, whereas colder temperatures of 20 °C (68 °F) and lower had higher mortality rates and the longest gestation periods. I. paradoxus has been found to survive at temperatures as low as 4.5 °C (39.74 °F). All species of Idiosepius, except I. thailandicus and I. minimus, hatch with tentacles. Temperate Idiosepius species mature slower, grow larger, and have less generations a year compared to tropical species. Sexual dimorphism in Idiosepius is common and generally females are larger than males.

== Behaviour ==
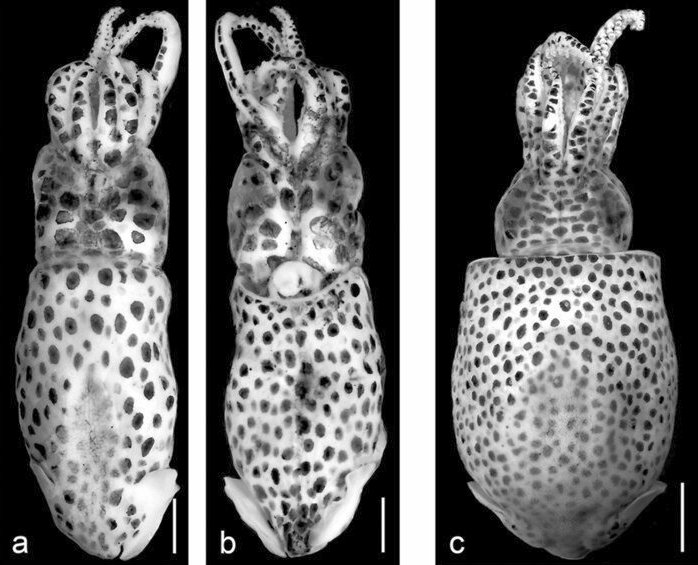
Dorsal and ventral views of I. kijimuna. The adhesive organ is located where the patch of discoloration is on the dorsal mantle views (a and c)

=== Adhesion strategy ===
Pygmy squids adhere to substrates using secretions from the adhesive organ, not using suckers on their appendages. They are thought to temporarily attach to substrates in a similar fashion to gastropods, however the mechanism involved with detaching from a substrate is currently unknown. Adhesion is important during mating, egg deposition, and is a mechanism for avoiding predation.

=== Habitat preference ===
Idiosepius are all neritic marine species. They have been found in the Indo-Pacific region, specifically South Africa, Tasmania, Mozambique, Japan, China, Australia, Indonesia, and Thailand. Pygmy squids like to adhere to substrates in seagrass beds, mangroves, seashores, and estuaries. Individuals and eggs are assumed to migrate as the substrate they are adhered to is moved and may also disperse passively as they are caught in sea currents.

=== Predatory behaviour ===
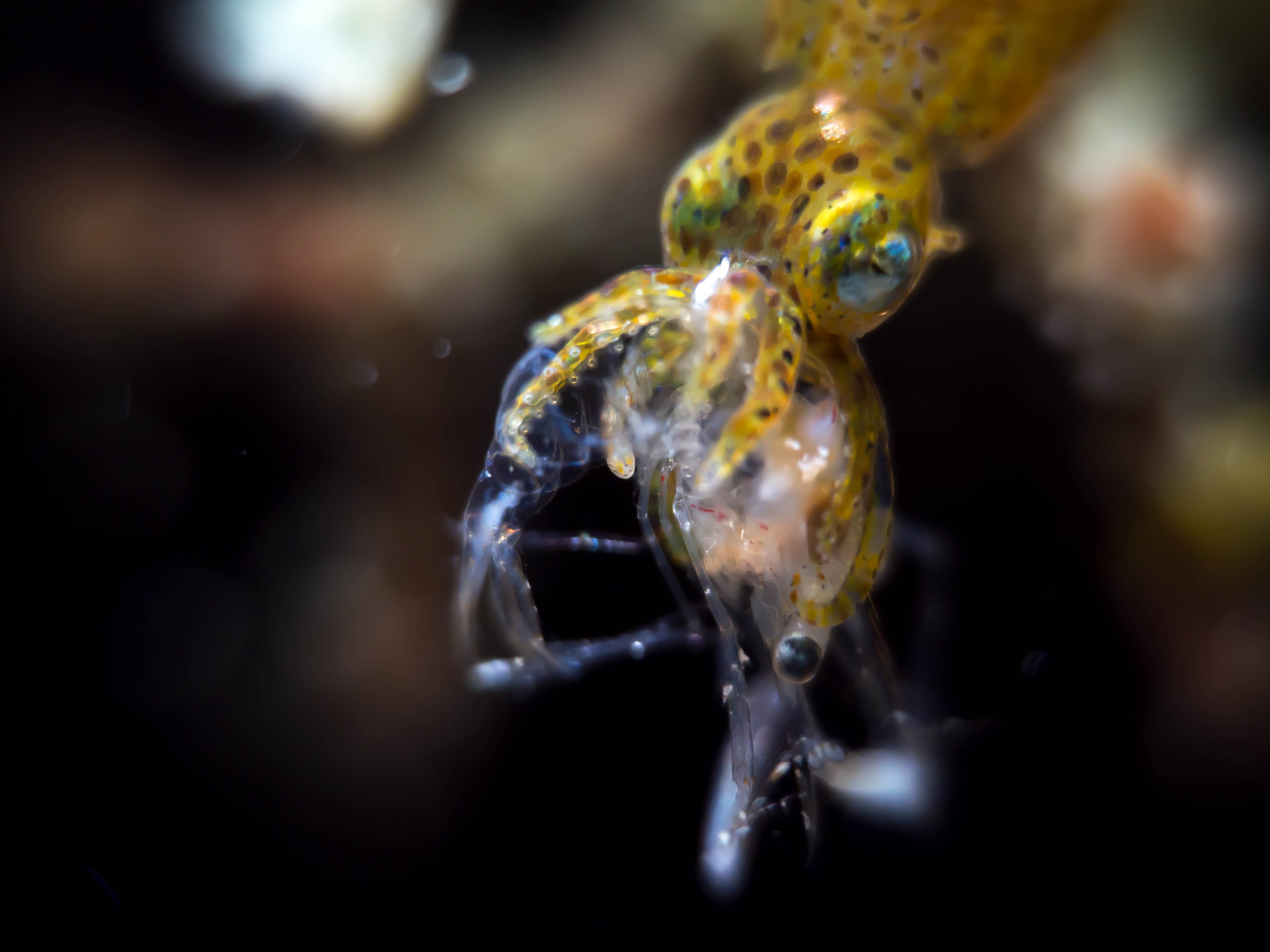
I. pygmaeus eating a shrimp

Most research into Idiosepius feeding behaviour has mainly been studied in I. paradoxus and has been categorized into attacking and eating phases. Pygmy squids attack prey in a similar fashion to cuttlefish, and once their prey has been captured, the squid inserts the buccal mass into the exoskeleton or skin. Once the buccal mass has been inserted, the squid releases cephalotoxin to paralyze the prey, and enzymes to externally digest the flesh. Pygmy squids typically only predate on smaller prey like shrimp, as larger prey can not be paralyzed and are only partially digested. These squids are able to digest so much of the flesh of a shrimp, that what remains often resembles what is left after a moult. I. paradoxus has been observed to sometimes ink during predation, which may function as a type of smoke screen or distraction when catching active prey.
