= Cryptic female choice =

Biological mechanism to control fertilization

Cryptic female choice is a form of mate choice which occurs both in pre- and post-copulatory circumstances in which females of certain species use physical or chemical mechanisms to control a male's success of fertilizing their ova or ovum; i.e. by selecting whether sperm are successful in fertilizing their eggs or not. It occurs in internally fertilizing species and involves differential use of sperm by females when sperm are available in the reproductive tract.

The present understanding of cryptic female choice is largely thanks to the extensive research and analysis done by William G. Eberhard. The term 'cryptic' according to Eberhard is meant to describe an internal and thereby hidden choice some female organisms are able to make following insemination with regards to sperm selection. In male species with intromittent organs, during copulation, a male inserts his reproductive organ into that of a female so as to inseminate her with his genetic material. Through the development of mechanisms that either prematurely inhibit copulation or act following male insemination, females are able to prevent undesirable males from successfully fertilizing their eggs. Thus, not every copulatory event is successful; there are many factors that combine to determine whether or not an offspring is created. It is likely that cryptic female choice is a consequence of the conflict between the reproductive desires of males and females. While males commonly increase their reproductive success by maximally fertilizing each female they mate with, females can incur costs to their personal health as a result of such behavior. Cryptic female choice reduces these costs by allowing them to also benefit from and select for favorable matings.

== Theory ==
Females not only exert sexual control but also benefit from exerting such control over male reproductive success. It has been observed that in some species males continue to court females following copulation, which illuminates the fact above. This female control compels males to continue to impress their female counterparts following copulation. The assumption above can be made because there is an energetic cost for a male to continue to court a female following insemination because he has to invest energy to do so. And, because there is an energetic investment he must benefit in some way. As such, sexual selection does not only act on traits that influence female mate choice of males but it also acts on male traits that determine his success following copulation.

There are circumstances in nature in which a male's interaction with a female is of detriment to her personal well-being and that of her offspring, one such situation, sexual coercion, occurs when a male harasses a female prior to copulation. In such circumstances where the female's lifespan and fertility are compromised, it benefits females to develop evasive mechanisms. In addition, in some species where multiple males inseminate a female, a female is able to select the most desirable sperm for her offspring by rejecting that which she desires less. In both of the aforementioned situations it is a female's reproductive actions that affect male reproductive success following copulation. As discussed below, female species that are able to use cryptic choice have developed various mechanisms to manipulate male reproductive success. Species that are able to use cryptic choice only use one of the below mechanisms to do so. Regardless of the mechanism, this ability allows females to respond differently to conspecific males depending on whether the male that inseminates her is favorable to her or not.

== Mechanisms of cryptic female choice ==
Many mechanisms exist in the animal world that allow females to practice cryptic female choice by manipulating which reproductive events are successful or not. These choices can occur at varying stages of the reproductive process.

=== Pre-copulation ===
Pre-Copulation – female cryptic choice can include physical, anatomical, and chemical barriers that can promote or hinder a male's success in the mating process.

==== Morphology ====
(Physical/Anatomical): At the pre-copulatory level female cryptic choice consists of the physical and anatomical barriers that females use to decide whether a male is successful or not. This can fall under two subcategories as a result of mating strategies:

- Antagonistic coevolution: Among species that mate multiple times, studies have shown much greater divergence in genital morphology than in species who mate singly. The rapid evolution of internal female and male reproductive morphology is due to the high sexual selection pressures characteristic of polygamous populations. In such cases, females can use cryptic female choice in choosing for or resisting males with specific physical or anatomical traits. Duck genitalia and anatomical evolution is a prime example of this male-female conflict through evolution of internal anatomical barriers.
- Coevolution: Female cryptic choice may also act indirectly by choosing for males with subtle secondary sexual traits that may cater to easier insemination and mating. In these instances female cooperation during the mating process is crucial for male success. For example, in the yellow fever mosquito, successful copulation requires a multistep process with a cooperative and receptive female. In the Caribbean fruit fly, males must display a specific calling song to induce female cooperation which allows the male to penetrate the female deeply, increasing his chances of success.

In both cases, without the compliance of the female, the male will be unsuccessful in his mating attempt. As such, females can choose for specific male traits by hindering complete intromission or ejaculation during mating.

==== Chemical ====
At the pre-copulatory level female cryptic choice can also be employed through chemical means to allow for mating with some males while deceiving other males.

- Masking estrus cycle: Female cryptic choice can also occur when females mask their estrus cycle. Specifically in mammals, by hiding the timing of their estrus cycle, females can avoid male control and pursue their own reproductive strategies. This way a female in estrus can sometimes avoid being swamped by competing males or she can prevent male harassment, coercion, or forced mating.

=== Insemination ===
Female cryptic choice can also occur after the male has mated and released his sperm.

- Copulation times: A longer copulation time generally means increased mating success for a male. A female may exercise cryptic female choice by determining whether a male can mate for longer or for shorter periods of time, thus increasing or decreasing male insemination success. In hanging flies, females allow males that provide larger nuptial gifts to copulate longer, which increases male fitness. In the tiger beetle, females sometimes forcefully terminate a copulation to deny male insemination.
- Discard current sperm: During most copulatory events, only a fraction of a male's sperm is usually taken up and stored by the female. In some species, females can sometimes discard sperm by sperm ejection, releasing sperm after mating so that they are free to mate again if another, more preferred male comes along. Females can also sometimes exercise cryptic female choice by mating several times and selectively discarding sperm from certain males while retaining those from preferred males. In Drosophila flies and in field crickets, females mate multiply and select for sperm or spermatophores of certain males.
- Destroy current sperm: Females can also exercise cryptic female choice by committing spermatocide. They can sometimes destroy stored male sperm through various means, usually chemically (raising pH, hormones, bodily chemical fluids, etc.) after a mating to allow for a second male to successfully inseminate her.
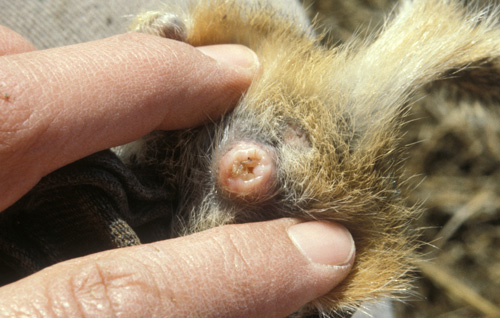
  Copulatory plug
- Copulatory plug: After inseminating a female, certain species of males will then insert a copulatory plug to prevent females from mating again, or to discourage or prevent other males from displacing their sperm. Some females have the ability to either keep or remove the plug and thus choose which sperm they select to keep. Females can remove this plug so they may successfully re-mate again if a better prospect comes along.
- Sperm-transplant: Females can also exercise cryptic female choice by preventing the transfer of sperm to a storage organ or fertilization sites. This can occur through various means such as muscular contractions, hormones, nervous control, or bodily fluids or chemicals, etc. In some lab rats females demonstrated their ability to halt sperm transport by re-mating more quickly after certain mating events.
- Make subsequent sperm transfer more difficult morphologically: Females can sometimes influence ease of sperm transfer during mating. In certain species of arthropods, such as the golden silk spider, some females can change the rate at which the cuticle of their genitalia hardens to manipulate ease of sperm transfer.

=== Fertilization ===
Females can also exercise cryptic female choice during the fertilization processes.

==== Sperm bias in storage or transportation ====
By utilizing sperm storage and transplant, females can exercise cryptic female choice by storing or transplanting sperm to bias sperm success rates towards certain males.

- Adjacent sperm storage organs: Females can sometimes store sperm in adjacent organs, especially when they mate multiply and thus give unequal preference to certain males. In many polygamous species, males often have the ability to displace a previous male's sperm. In response to this, females retain control of sperm choice by using multiple sperm storage sites to exercise cryptic female choice. By moving sperm to adjacent organs females can prevent particular sperm from being displaced and save the displaced sperm for fertilization. Moving the sperm can also prevent it from continuing on in the fertilization process. In the Dryomiza anilis fly and in the flour beetle, females choose sperm from a number of different storage locations. In the red flour beetle, females often possess several storage receptacles for sperm from different males, and can choose which sperm to utilize for fertilization.
- Sperm transplant: Similar to sperm storage mechanisms of cryptic female choice, females can exercise cryptic female choice by promoting or hindering sperm movement in and out of the reproductive tract into storage structures through muscular contractions.

==== Failing to prepare uterus for embryo implantation ====
Females can control hormonal signals that halt embryo preparation to keep sperm from successfully fertilizing the embryo. They can also promote or hinder ovulation as a means of exercising cryptic female choice. By hindering ovulation, a copulatory interaction may be deemed unsuccessful. In rats and golden hamsters, females denied a male's success by failing to prepare their uterus based on male stimulation.

==== Select for or against sperm during hyperactivation ====
After insemination, male sperm are relatively slow and inert in the reproductive tracts or storage areas of the female and are only activated by calcium ionophores in vitro. Thus by releasing or withholding the necessary ions to activate the sperm, females can promote faster motility of sperm towards the egg for fertilization or hinder it by slowing their motility and allowing them to die before they reach the egg respectively.

==== Choosing from among sperm to reach the egg ====
Female ovarian fluids can promote or hinder sperm especially if they have complementary or uncomplimentary chemical signals. This is the case in wrasses and guppies.

Some females may also physically choose from among spermatophores taken from multiple matings.

==== Choosing from among sperm to fertilize the egg ====
In some species, the egg cell itself can have preferences for certain types of sperm. Two species of Echinometra sea urchins produce eggs that prefer sperm with a similar bindin genotype as their own. Mouse egg glycoproteins also have preferences when it comes to sperm surface proteins; a mismatch causes reduced litter sizes. In addition, mice, salmon, and guppies also produce eggs that have specific major histocompatibility complex protein preferences.

Eggs commonly have a mechanism to defend against polyspermy. It's possible that this mechanism can also exert a degree of sperm choice.

==== Failure to ovulate ====
Females can sometimes change their differential ovulation responses based on male stimuli to affect male reproductive success. In lions some females will reduce fertility after the male commits infanticide, resulting in low offspring counts after a new male takes over a pride.

=== Gestation ===
Even after fertilization has occurred, females can exercise cryptic female choice.

- Abortion: By aborting the zygote or the fetus through female resistance or acceptance of male induced abortion signals, a female can exercise cryptic female choice.
- Reduce rate of offspring produced: Females can sometimes adjust rates of oviposition to determine the number of successful offspring a male's sperm will produce after a mating event. In the leaf-rolling frog, females can delay spawn times which determines the number of final offspring produced from a mating event.
- Fail to mature eggs: Some females can deny male reproductive success by controlling the development and maturation of eggs in her ovary. In the red garter snake, some females failed to produce eggs after a mating event.

=== Post-birth ===
Even after birth has occurred, females can manipulate male offspring success.

- Invest less in each offspring: by altering rates of investment in an offspring, a female can sometimes exercise cryptic female choice.

== Examples ==
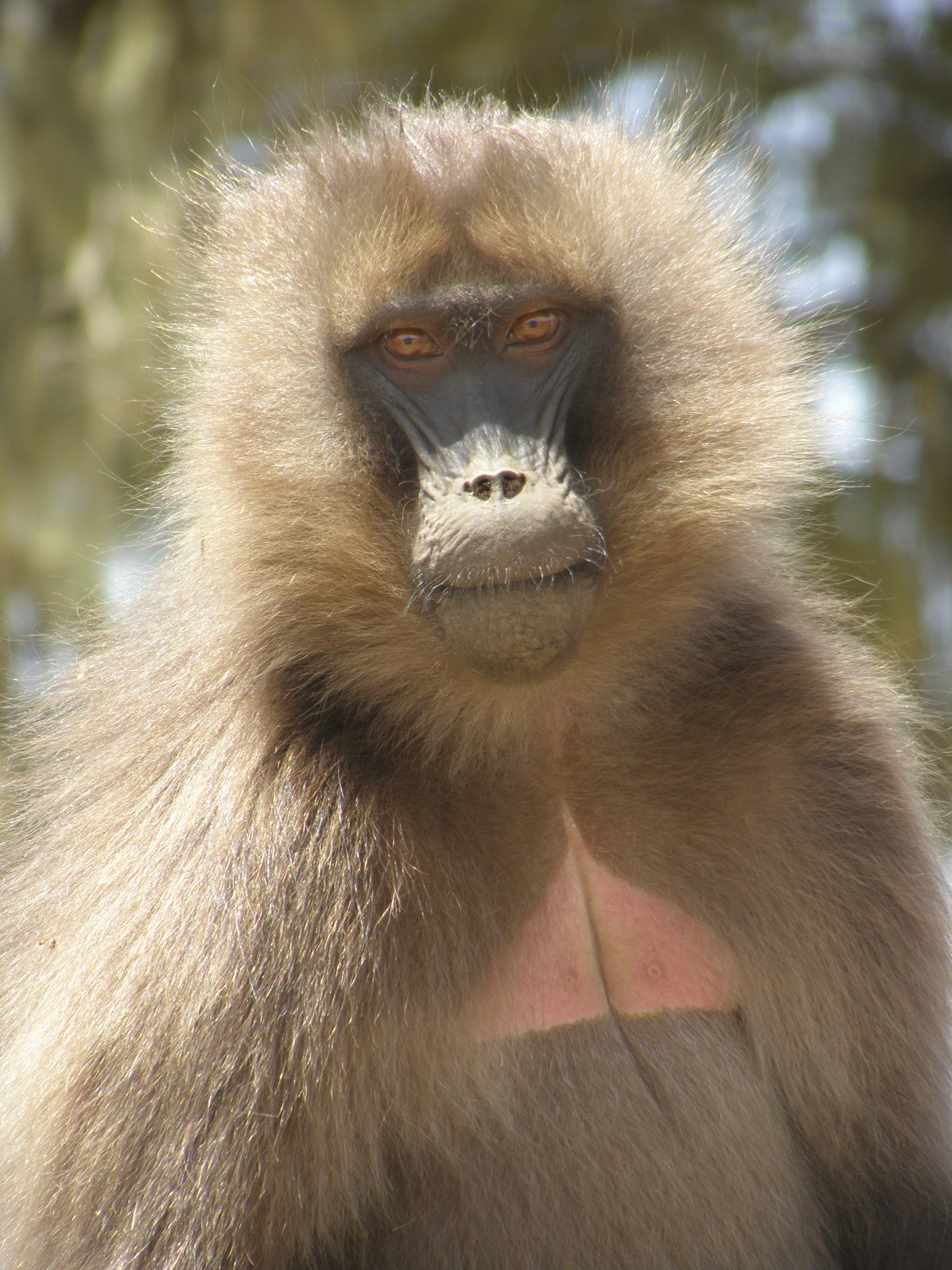
Theropithecus gelada

The wide variety of species around the world provides us with many examples of each mechanism of cryptic female choice. This section provides a more detailed example of a few of the mechanisms of cryptic female choice seen in particular species.

In the Cassadine Plant Beetle, Chelymorpha alternans, the female has a complexly coiled spermathecal duct that frequently reverses in direction. With this reversal, the female is able to discriminate between males' gentalic sclerite. This is an example of a copulatory mechanism where the female actively hinders a successful mating.

The Sand Lizard, Lacerta agilis, provides us an example of cryptic female choice during the insemination phase of mating. Females routinely and indiscriminately copulate with several males. The females who mate more often have greater hatching success, lowering the incidence of deformities among offspring, and enhancing survival of free-living offspring. The aforementioned consequences are a result of the females' ability to differentially use the sperm from the least related male. Thus, the males most genetically similar to the female sire less offspring.

Some species have a sperm transplant mechanism. Crickets are one such species that can prematurely remove spermatophore after copulation, which terminates sperm transfer. In one study, males were randomly assigned to females to create half-sib families to determine the heritability of spermatophore retention time in females. The researchers found that there was additive genetic variance in the timing of spermatophore removal by females. These results suggest that the timing of the spermatophore removal is determined partly by genotype and is independent of the quality of a female's mate. This shows no difference between the fitness of females who freely remove the spermatophore and the fitness of females that are forced to accept complete ejaculates.

The female spider, Pisaura mirabilis, stores more sperm from males who give a nuptial gift compared to those who share no such gift. This shows a biased use of stored sperm and hence cryptic female choice in a post-copulatory mechanism.

Theropithecus gelada is a wild primate that demonstrates cryptic female choice through a gestation mechanism. The females have been reported to have a strong Bruce effect. Bruce effect is when the female terminates the pregnancy when she is exposed to an unrelated male. Female geladas terminate about 80% of their pregnancies the week after the dominant male has been replaced. This could be because males typically perform infanticide when they take over a new group. Terminating a pregnancy could be a female's way to protect herself and avoid infanticide of her young. Studies have been shown to support the hypothesis that the Bruce effect can be an adaptive strategy for females.

The Japanese pygmy squid, Idiosepius paradoxus, is yet another example of a species which exhibits cryptic female choice. The males place spermatangia on an external location on the female's body, and the female is able to physically remove spermatangia to select for preferred traits in males, enacting postcopulatory intersexual selection.

Species of Harpobittacus, a genus of hanging fly or scorpionfly, are another example. Females exercise post-copulatory control after mating with multiple males by determining rate of fertilization by each male. Females continue to mate with different males until finding one with a large nuptial gift, upon which she enters a period of sexual non-receptivity and begins laying eggs.
