= Lusitania (alga) =

Scientific classification
- Clade: Viridiplantae
- Division: Chlorophyta
- Class: Trebouxiophyceae
- Order: incertae sedis
- Family: Coccomyxaceae
- Genus: Lusitania; P.González
- Species: L. henriquesii

Binomial name
- Lusitania henriquesii P.González, 1949

Genus of green algae

Lusitania is a genus of green algae, in the family Coccomyxaceae. Its sole species is Lusitania henriquesii.
