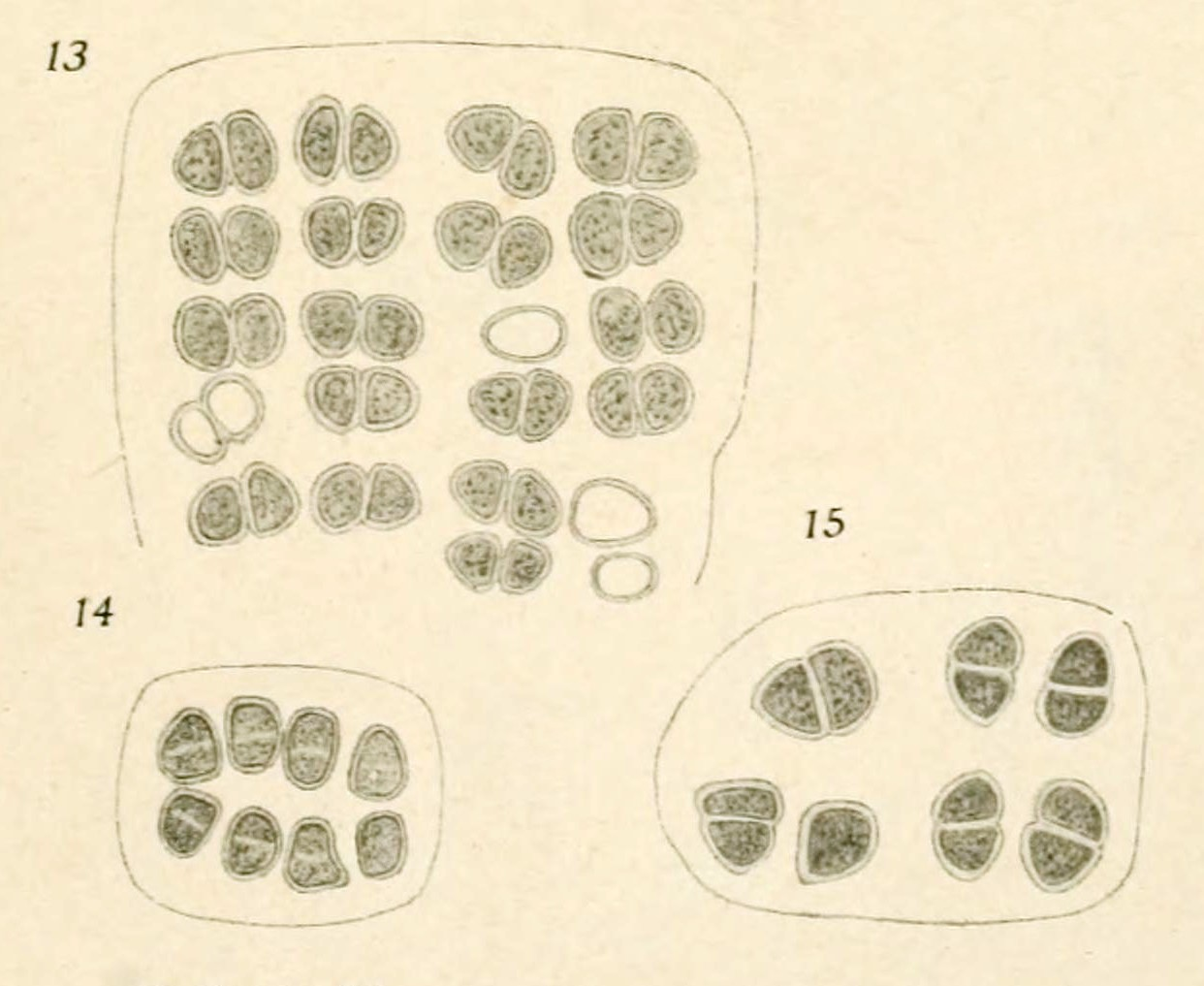
- Dispora crucigneioides

Scientific classification
- Clade: Viridiplantae
- Division: Chlorophyta
- Class: Trebouxiophyceae
- Order: incertae sedis
- Family: Coccomyxaceae
- Genus: Dispora; Printz

Type species
- Dispora crucigenioides Printz

Species
- Dispora crucigenioides Printz; Dispora cuneiformis (Schmidle) Printz; Dispora globosa C.E.M.Bicudo & R.M.T.Bicudo

= Dispora =

Genus of algae

Dispora is a genus of green algae, in the family Coccomyxaceae. It is found in freshwater habitats especially in those with low pH, but it is typically uncommon or rare.

== Description ==
Dispora consists of microscopic colonies of cells, ranging from four to 128, in a homogeneous mucilage. Within the colony, cells are arranged in diads or tetrads, usually as a grid in a flat plane. One species, D. globosa, has globular colonies. Cells are hemispherical, ovate, or triangular; cells are uninucleate with a single parietal chloroplast and no pyrenoids (except for D. globosa). Cells reproduce by simple vegetative division, while colonies may reproduce by fragmentation.
