= Dactylothece =

Scientific classification
- Clade: Viridiplantae
- Division: Chlorophyta
- Class: Trebouxiophyceae
- Order: incertae sedis
- Family: Coccomyxaceae
- Genus: Dactylothece; Lagerheim, 1883

Species
- D. arcuatum; D. braunii; D. sudetica Beck

Genus of algae

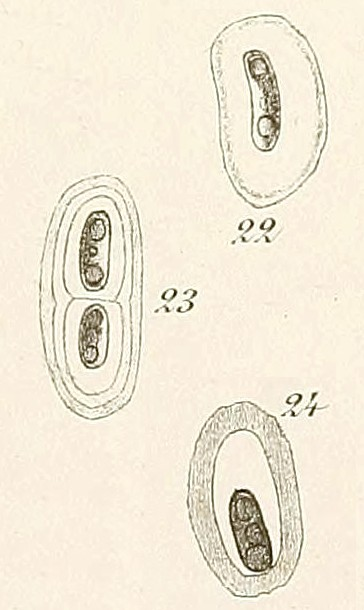
Dactylothece braunii, an example of a creature with the genus Dactylothece

Dactylothece is a genus of green algae, in the family Coccomyxaceae.
