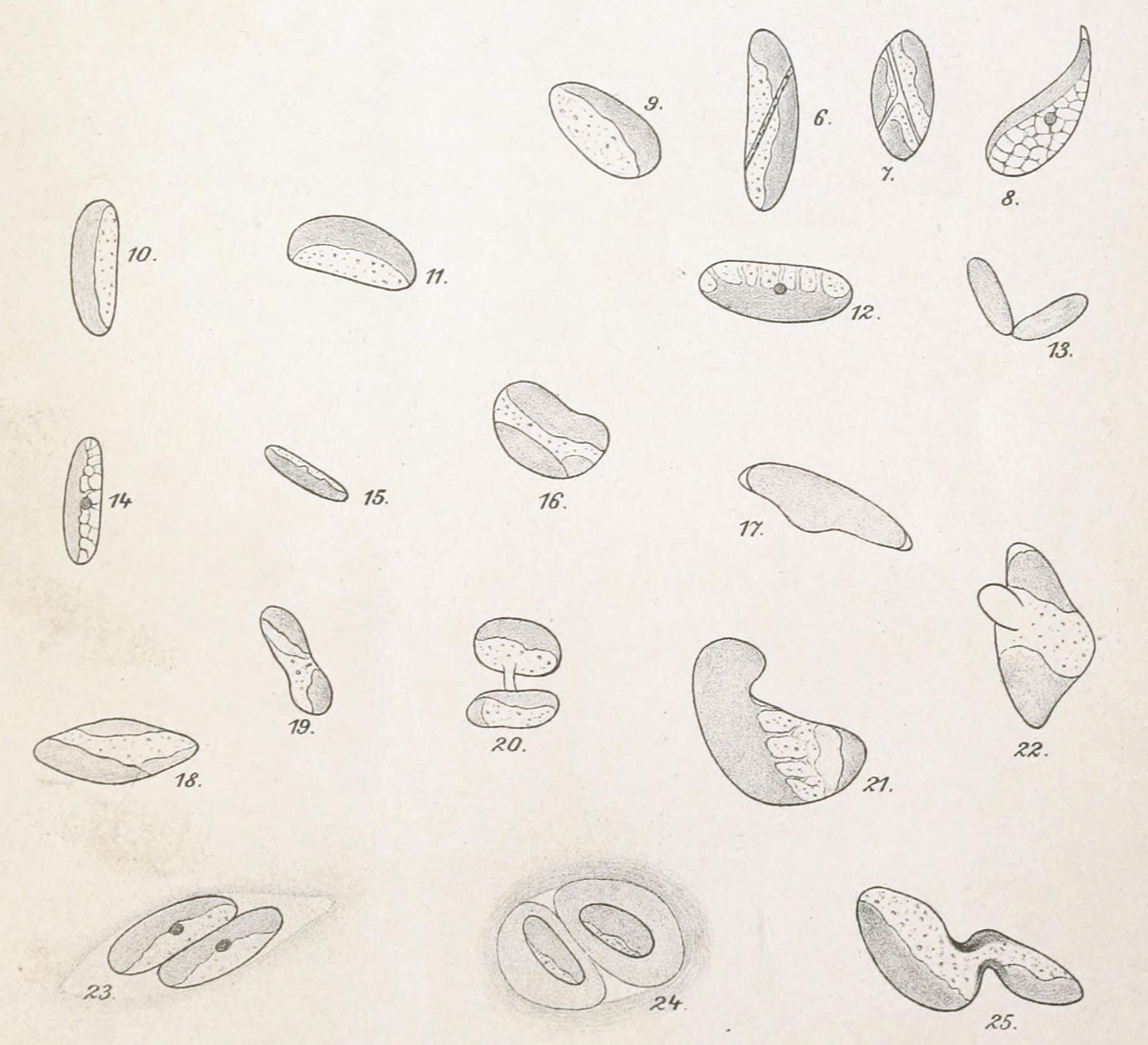
- Coccomyxa confluens

Scientific classification
- Kingdom: Plantae
- Division: Chlorophyta
- Class: Trebouxiophyceae
- Order: incertae sedis
- Family: Coccomyxaceae; G.M. Smith, 1933

Genera
- Choricystis; Coccomyxa; Dactylothece; Diogenes; Dispora; Lusitania; Medakamo; Nannokloster; Ourococcus; Palmogloea; Paradoxia

= Coccomyxaceae =

Family of algae

Coccomyxaceae is a family of algae, in the class Trebouxiophyceae.

Members of the family Coccomyxaceae are microscopic algae found often in colonies surrounded by mucilage. Sexual reproduction has not been observed in this family. Cells multiply by simple vegetative division, sometimes by forming autospores, but not zoospores. The genus Paradoxia produces zoospores; its placement in Coccomyxaceae is apparently due to a strain labeled as Paradoxia multiseta in the UTEX-Austin culture collection which was found to have a close phylogenetic relationship to Coccomyxa. However, the morphology of the strain (having spherical cells) does not appear to match that of Paradoxia, making the identity suspect.
