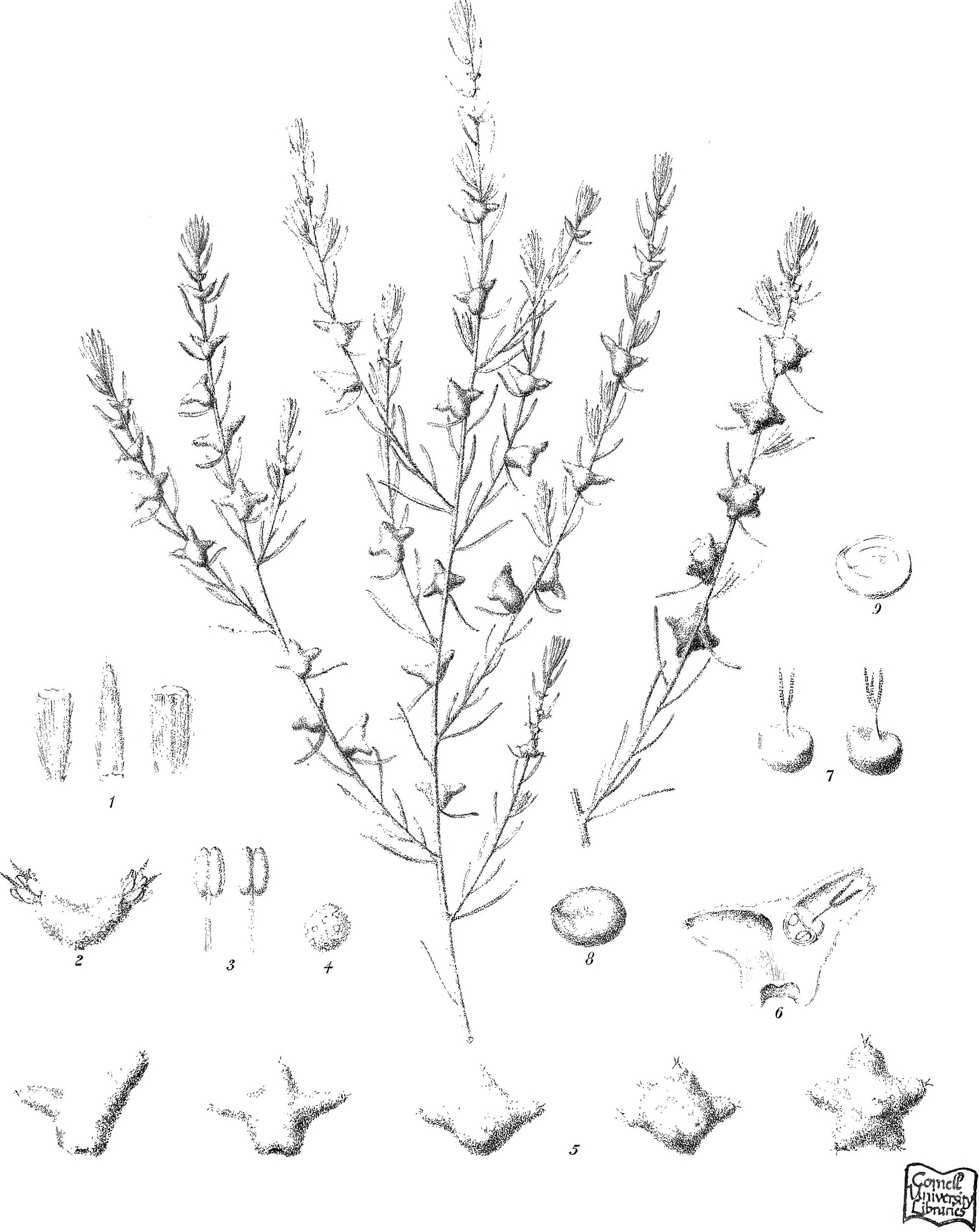

Scientific classification
- Kingdom: Plantae
- Clade: Tracheophytes
- Clade: Angiosperms
- Clade: Eudicots
- Order: Caryophyllales
- Family: Amaranthaceae
- Genus: Dissocarpus
- Species: D. biflorus

Binomial name
- Dissocarpus biflorus (R.Br.) F.Muell.

= Dissocarpus biflorus =

Species of flowering plant

Dissocarpus biflorus, commonly known as twin flower saltbush, grows along the coast line and estuaries of Australia. The flowers grow as hairy clumps in the axils present between May and July.
