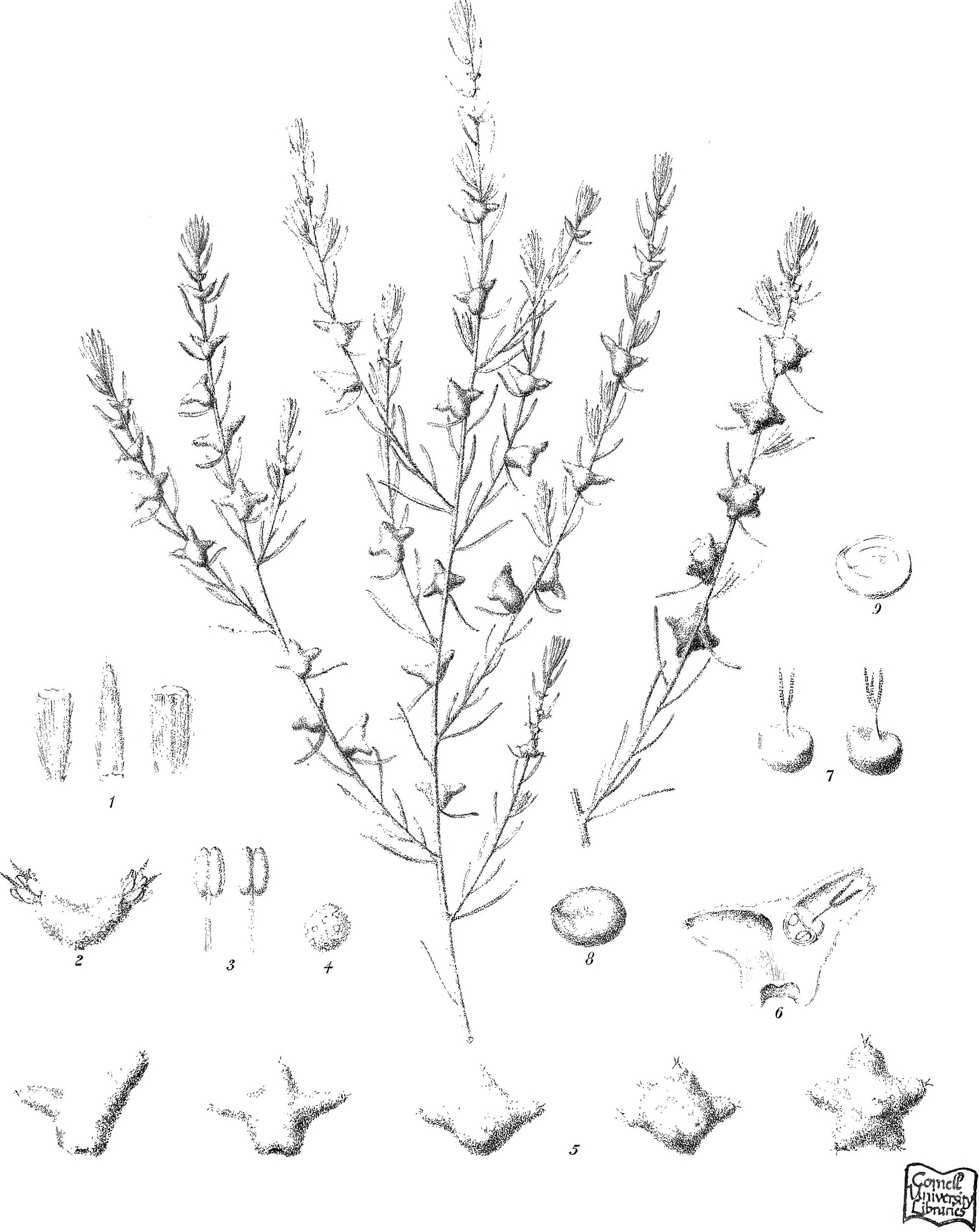
- Iconography of Australian salsolaceous plants (1889)

Scientific classification
- Kingdom: Plantae
- Clade: Tracheophytes
- Clade: Angiosperms
- Clade: Eudicots
- Order: Caryophyllales
- Family: Amaranthaceae
- Subfamily: Camphorosmoideae
- Tribe: Camphorosmeae
- Genus: Dissocarpus; F.Muell.

= Dissocarpus =

Genus of plants

Dissocarpus is a genus of flowering plants belonging to the family Amaranthaceae.

Its native range is Australia.

Species:

- Dissocarpus biflorus (R.Br.) F.Muell.
- Dissocarpus fontinalis Paul G.Wilson
- Dissocarpus latifolius (J.M.Black) Paul G.Wilson
- Dissocarpus paradoxus (R.Br.) F.Muell. ex Ulbr.
