= Ourococcus =

Scientific classification
- Kingdom: Plantae
- Division: Chlorophyta
- Class: Trebouxiophyceae
- Order: incertae sedis
- Family: Coccomyxaceae
- Genus: Ourococcus; Grobéty, 1909

Type species
- Ourococcus bicaudatus

Species
- See text.

Genus of algae

Ourococcus is a genus of green algae in the family Coccomyxaceae. As of February 2022, although AlgaeBase states that the genus is "taxonomically accepted", the type species Ourococcus bicaudatus, is said to be a synonym of Keratococcus bicaudatus, and no species of the genus are listed as accepted.
