= Metopides occipitalis =

Scientific classification
- Kingdom: Animalia
- Phylum: Arthropoda
- Clade: Pancrustacea
- Class: Insecta
- Order: Coleoptera
- Suborder: Polyphaga
- Infraorder: Cucujiformia
- Family: Cerambycidae
- Genus: Metopides
- Species: M. occipitalis

Binomial name
- Metopides occipitalis Pascoe, 1866

Species of beetle

Metopides occipitalis is a species of beetle in the family Cerambycidae. It was described by Francis Polkinghorne Pascoe in 1866. It is known from Malaysia, Borneo, and Sumatra. It contains the varietas Metopides occipitalis var. cordatus.
