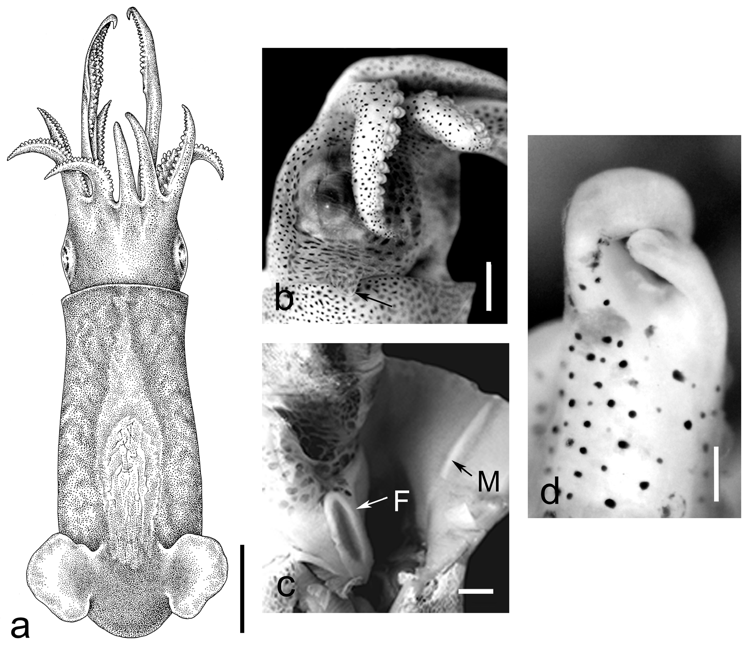

Conservation status
- Data Deficient (IUCN 3.1)

Scientific classification
- Kingdom: Animalia
- Phylum: Mollusca
- Class: Cephalopoda
- Order: Idiosepida
- Family: Idiosepiidae
- Genus: Xipholeptos; Reid & Strugnell, 2018
- Species: X. notoides

Binomial name
- Xipholeptos notoides (Berry, 1921)

Synonyms
- Idiosepius notoides Berry, 1921

= Xipholeptos =

Genus of molluscs

Xipholeptos is a genus of squid in the family Idiosepiidae. It is monotypic, being represented by the single species Xipholeptos notoides, commonly known as the southern pygmy squid. The species was originally classified as Idiosepius notoides. The southern pygmy squid is native to the southwestern Pacific Ocean, off southern and eastern Australia. It inhabits shallow, inshore waters. It has been recorded off the coasts of New South Wales, South Australia, Tasmania and Victoria.

Females grow to 25 mm in mantle length, while males are not known to exceed 15.8 mm in mantle length. This species occurs in beds of seagrass in bays and inlets where it feeds during the night on small crustaceans such as shrimp. In the daytime they remain hidden within the seagrass, adhering to the leaves of the seagrass using a glue excreted by a gland on the dorsal surface of the body. The females attach the eggs onto seagrass blades, most typically species of the genera Heterozostera and Zostera. There is thought to be a pelagic stage during this species' development.

The type-specimen was collected off Goolwa, South Australia, Australia, and is held at the South Australian Museum in Adelaide. Molecular data suggest that Xipholeptos from western Australia represent a distinct species, but its formal description awaits further study.
