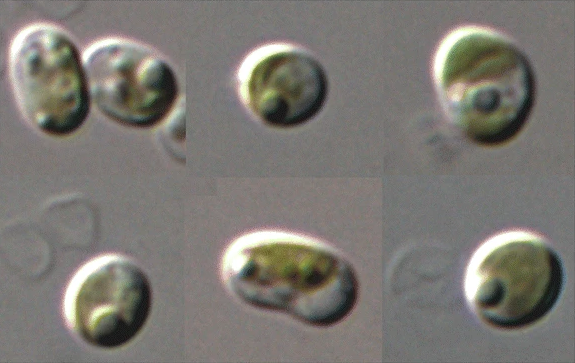
- Choricystis krienitzii

Scientific classification
- Kingdom: Plantae
- Division: Chlorophyta
- Class: Trebouxiophyceae
- Order: incertae sedis
- Family: Coccomyxaceae
- Genus: Choricystis (Skuja) Fott, 1976

Type species
- Choricystis minor (Skuja, 1948) Fott, 1976

Species
- Choricystis coccoides (Rodhe & Skuja) Fott; Choricystis cylindracea Hindák; Choricystis guttula Hindák; Choricystis hindakii Tell; Choricystis komarekii Comas González; Choricystis krienitzii Pröschold & Darienko; Choricystis limnetica Pröschold & Darienko; Choricystis minor (Skuja) Fott = Choricystis parasitica (K.Brandt) Pröschold & Darienko; Choricystis tatrae (Hindák) Hindák

= Choricystis =

Genus of algae

Choricystis is a genus of green algae in the class Trebouxiophyceae, considered a characteristic picophytoplankton in freshwater ecosystems. Choricystis, especially the type species Choricystis minor, has been proposed as an effective source of fatty acids for biofuels. Choricystis algacultures have been shown to survive on wastewater. In particular, Choricystis has been proposed as a biological water treatment system for industrial waste produced by the processing of dairy goods.

Choricystis have been found in natural bodies of water in South America, North America, Europe, Asia, and Antarctica. They have been observed as an endosymbiont of freshwater sponges as well as ciliates like Paramecium bursaria.

== Description ==
Choricystis consists of solitary cells without a mucilage sheath surrounding them. Cells are uninucleate with a single parietal chloroplast. Chloroplasts lack pyrenoids. Reproduction occurs asexually by the formation of autospores; in field conditions, usually two are produced per cell, but in culture four per cell may be present as well. Zoospores or sexual reproduction have not been observed in this genus.

Identification of species within this genus is difficult because of few distinguishing morphological characters; species are now distinguished from each other using DNA barcodes.

== Use as a biofuel ==
Triglycerides and other lipids can be transesterified to produce fatty acid methyl esters, the primary component of biodiesel fuels. Because of their high lipid content and rate of lipid production, Choricystis algae have been suggested as effective microalgae for industrial biofuel production. Molecular profiles of C. minor have noted its high proportion of neutral (as opposed to polar) lipids, considered preferable in biodiesel production.

== See also ==
- Algae fuel
- Lipid extraction
- Sewage treatment
