= Palmogloea =

Scientific classification
- Clade: Viridiplantae
- Division: Chlorophyta
- Class: Trebouxiophyceae
- Order: incertae sedis
- Family: Coccomyxaceae
- Genus: Palmogloea; Kützing, 1843

Species
- See text.

Genus of algae

Palmogloea is a genus of green algae, in the family Coccomyxaceae. As of February 2022, the only "accepted" species listed by AlgaeBase was Palmogloea protuberans (Smith) Kützing, although many more species were listed as "preliminary".
