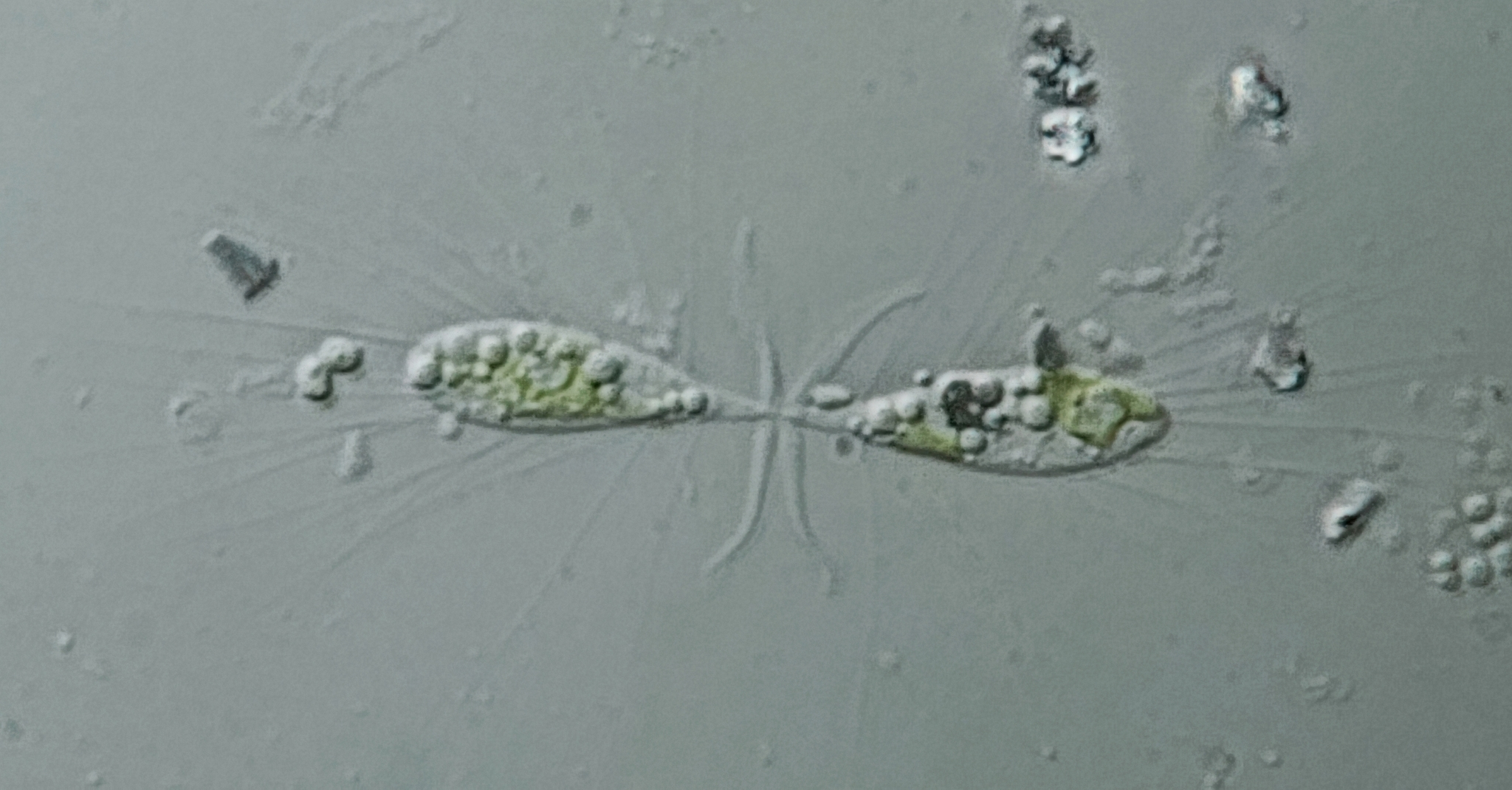
- Paradoxia multiseta

Scientific classification
- Clade: Viridiplantae
- Division: Chlorophyta
- Class: Trebouxiophyceae
- Order: incertae sedis
- Family: Coccomyxaceae
- Genus: Paradoxia; Svirenko, 1928

Type species
- Paradoxia multiseta Svirenko

= Paradoxia =

Genus of algae

Paradoxia is a genus of microscopic green algae, in the family Coccomyxaceae. It is found in freshwater habitats as phytoplankton worldwide, but species are rare.

== Description ==
Paradoxia consists of individual cells or pairs of cells. Individual cells are club-shaped or fusiform in outline, 18–45 μm long and 3–8 μm wide. When paired, the two cells are joined at the base by spines or leaf-like appendages that twist together. These leaf-like appendages have many fine curved ridges on one face. The cell wall is smooth and covered with thin spines up to 24 μm long. Cells are uninucleate (i.e. with one nucleus) and one chloroplast containing a single pyrenoid.

Reproduction occurs asexually via the formation of autospores or zoospores which form a coenobium while still in the mother cell wall. Resting spores have also been reported. Sexual reproduction has not been observed in this genus.

Paradoxia species are distinguished by the morphology of the cells, and whether or not they are paired. The genus may be closely related to others with leaf-like appendages at the cell ends, in particular Ankyra.

== Taxonomy ==
Sources disagree on where to place Paradoxia taxonomically. In their 1983 monograph, Jiří Komárek and Bohuslav Fott placed Paradoxia in the family Characiaceae. A strain labeled as Paradoxia multiseta in the UTEX-Austin culture collection was found to have a close phylogenetic relationship to Coccomyxa; however, the morphology of the strain (having spherical cells) does not appear to match that of Paradoxia, making the identity suspect.
