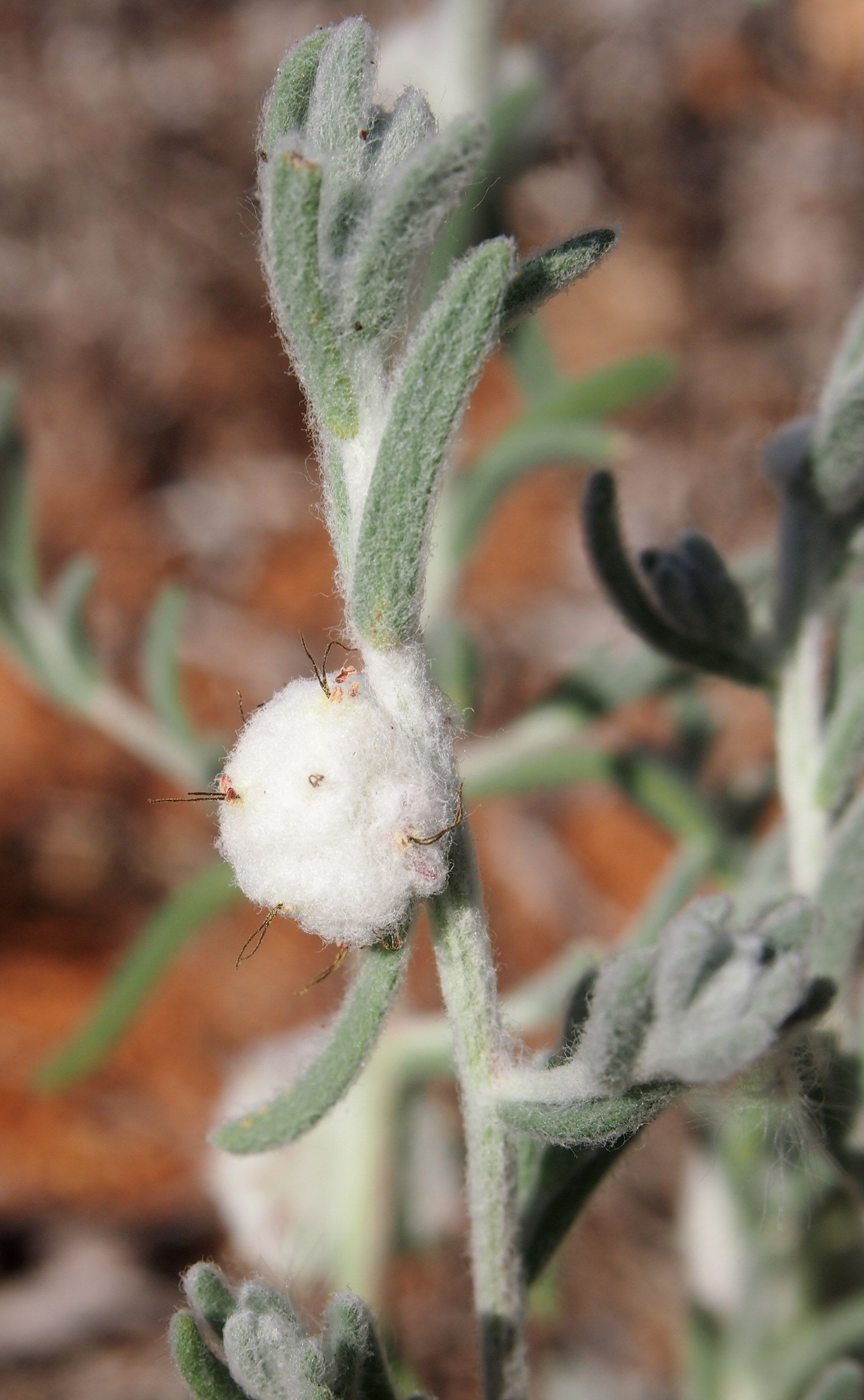
- Dissocarpus paradoxus flower

Scientific classification
- Kingdom: Plantae
- Clade: Tracheophytes
- Clade: Angiosperms
- Clade: Eudicots
- Order: Caryophyllales
- Family: Amaranthaceae
- Genus: Dissocarpus
- Species: D. paradoxus

Binomial name
- Dissocarpus paradoxus (R.Br.) F.Muell. ex Ulbr.
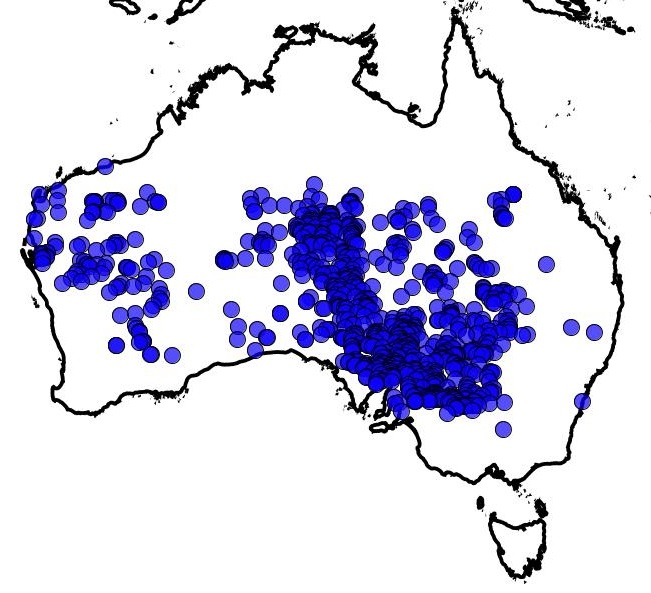

= Dissocarpus paradoxus =

Species of flowering plant

Dissocarpus paradoxus is a shrub species of inland Australia, also known by the common names of cannonball burr or curious saltbush.

== Description ==
Common names for Dissocarpus paradoxus include Cannon Ball Burr, Ball Bindyi, Curious Saltbush and Hard-head Bassia. The species was described and named (synonymous with Bassia paradoxa) by Robert Brown & Baron Ferdinand von Mueller. Dissocarpus paradoxus is a short lived perennial shrub growing to 50 cm high, with hairy leaves to 15mm long. The species has also been described as an annual or short-lived perennial forb or shrub, and sometimes growth is described as prostrate. The flowers consist of white woolly heads, with 8-16 flowers clustered together at the base of leaves. Flowering occurs from early spring through to summer, however flowering can sometimes occur at other times throughout the year. Fruit is globular, dense and a hardened mass of white woolly texture, around 10mm in diameter, with many ridged spines extending out of the woolly mass. As the hardened woody head decomposes, the seeds are released. Dissocarpus paradoxus Var. latifolia differs slightly from paradoxus, with oblong to wedged shaped leaves, which are 5-8mm wide.

== Ecology ==
The species occurs in many woodland communities including mallee, mulga, bimble box, belah-rosewood and gidgee communities, as well as bladder saltbush and black bluebush communities. Preferred habitat is red earth and solonized (high saline content) brown soils. Species of the family Chenopodiaceae have adapted to and are tolerant of highly alkaline soils, that contain high levels of carbonates and salts, whilst still being able to produce many seeds. Plants are short lived, and although specimens may be locally common, seasonal conditions can determine relative abundance of Dissocarpus paradoxus. Although stock do forage on Dissocarpus paradoxus, it is not as palatable as other forage plants.

== Taxonomy ==
The species is synonymous with Bassia paradoxa, Chenolea paradoxa and Sclerolaena paradoxa. Dissocarpus paradoxus is in the Saltbush family, a large plant family containing many important food crops, with most species of the family occurring in areas with soils that contain a high concentration of inorganic salts. Sometimes the Saltbush family Chenopodiaceae, is included as a subfamily within the family Amaranthaceae. The two families Chenopodiaceae and Amaranthaceae are related, and in Australia are often referred to as 'cheno-ams' In Australia there is documented use of the leaves and seed of cheno-ams as a food resource, by various Indigenous groups.

== Conservation status ==
Dissocarpus paradoxus is listed as 'of least concern' in Queensland and the Northern Territory, and as 'not threatened in Western Australia.

== Image gallery ==
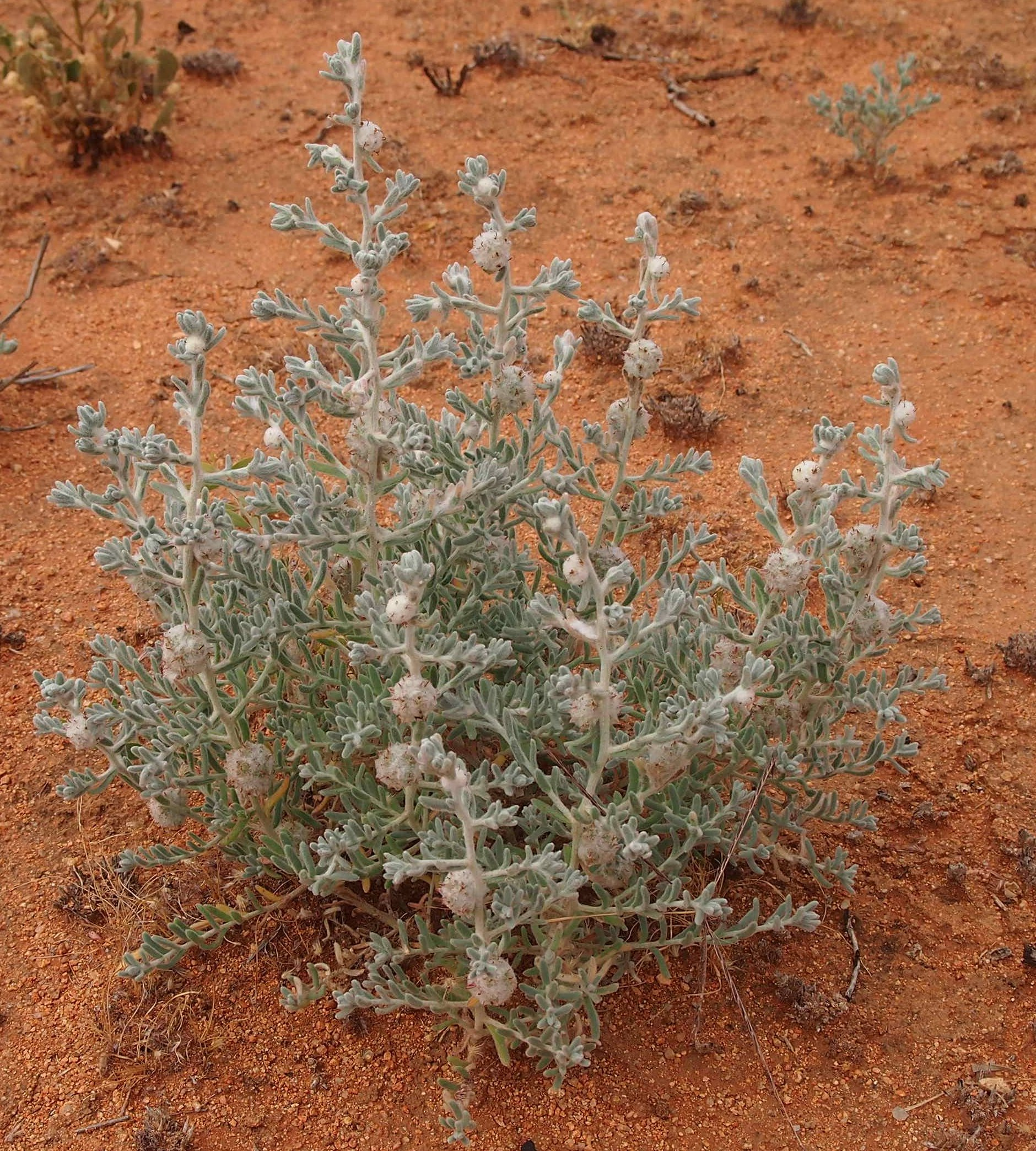

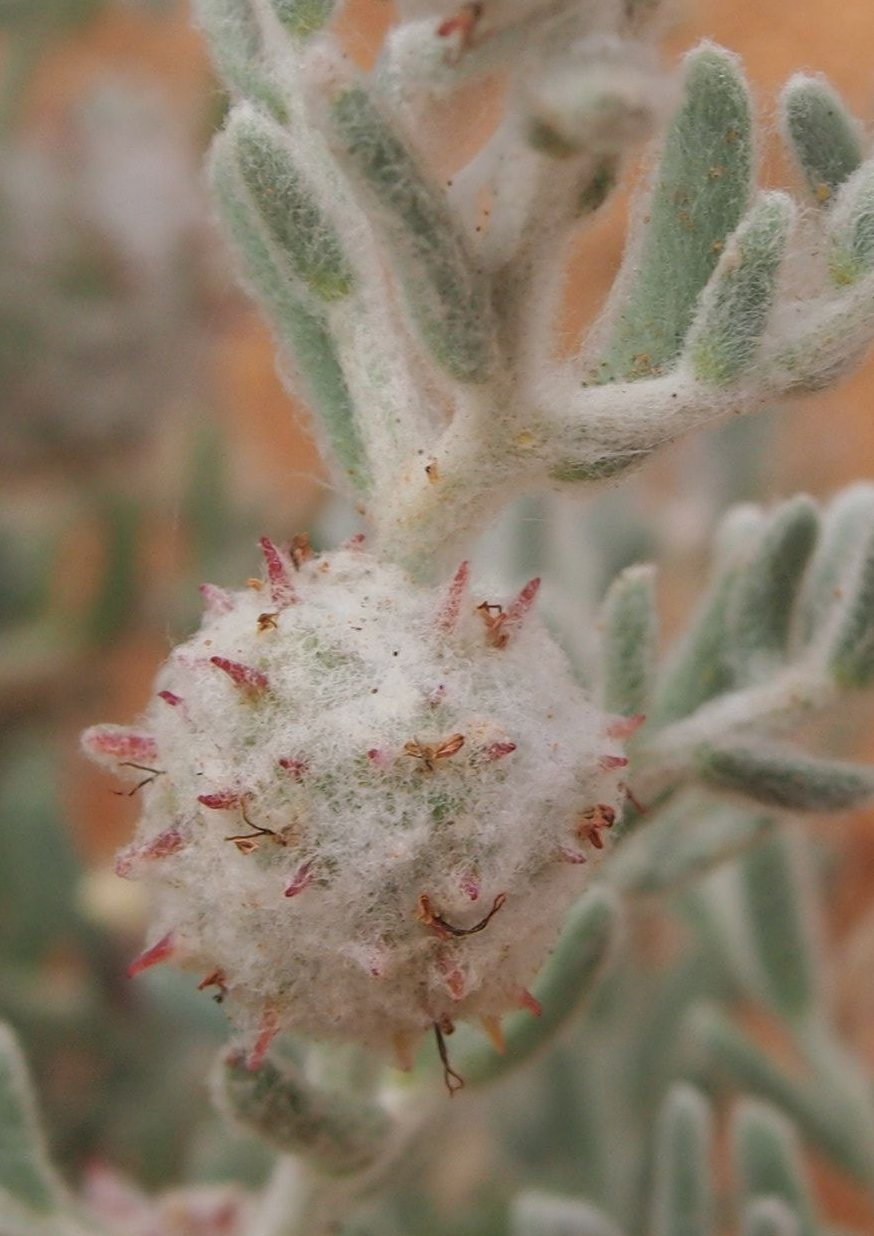

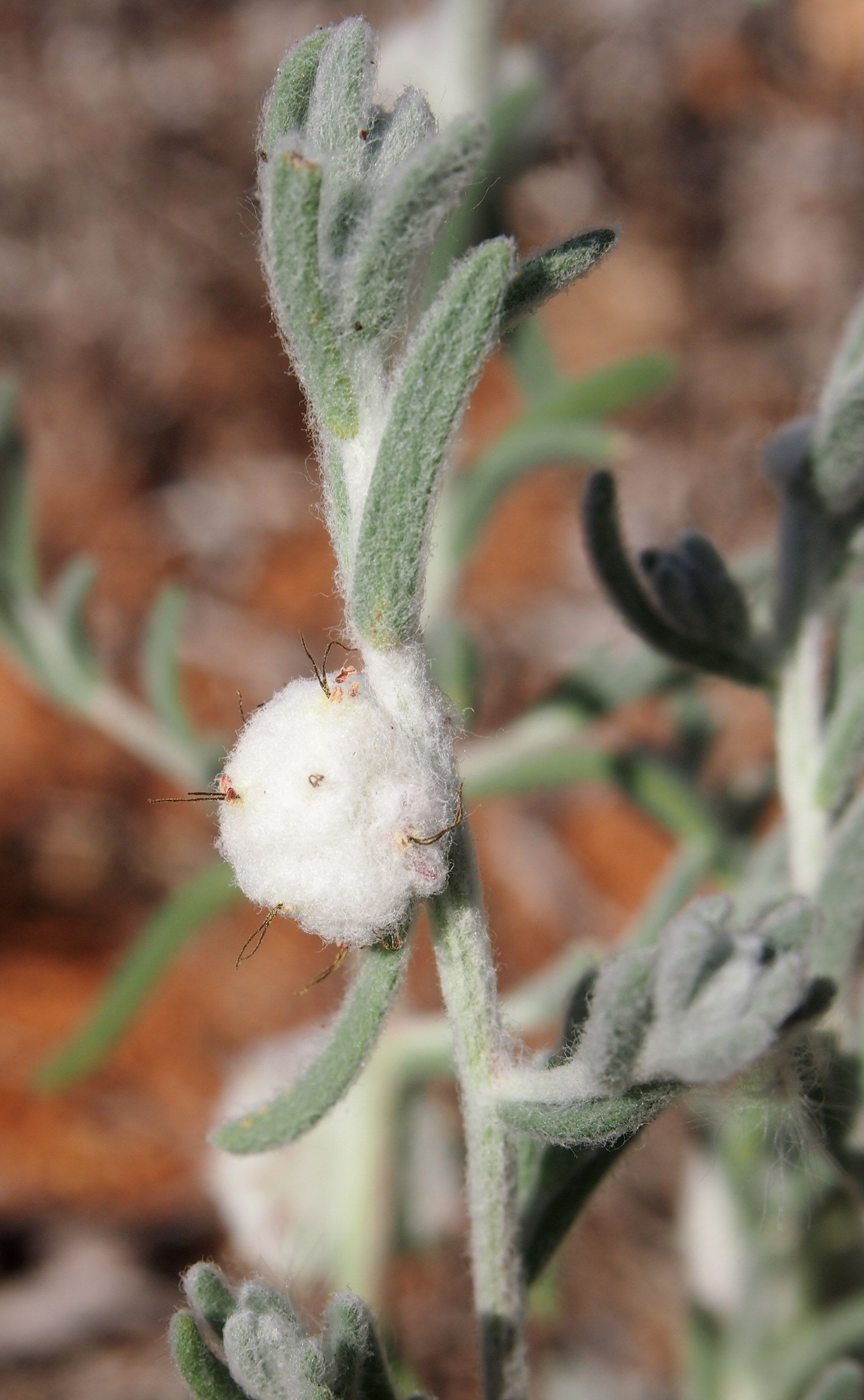

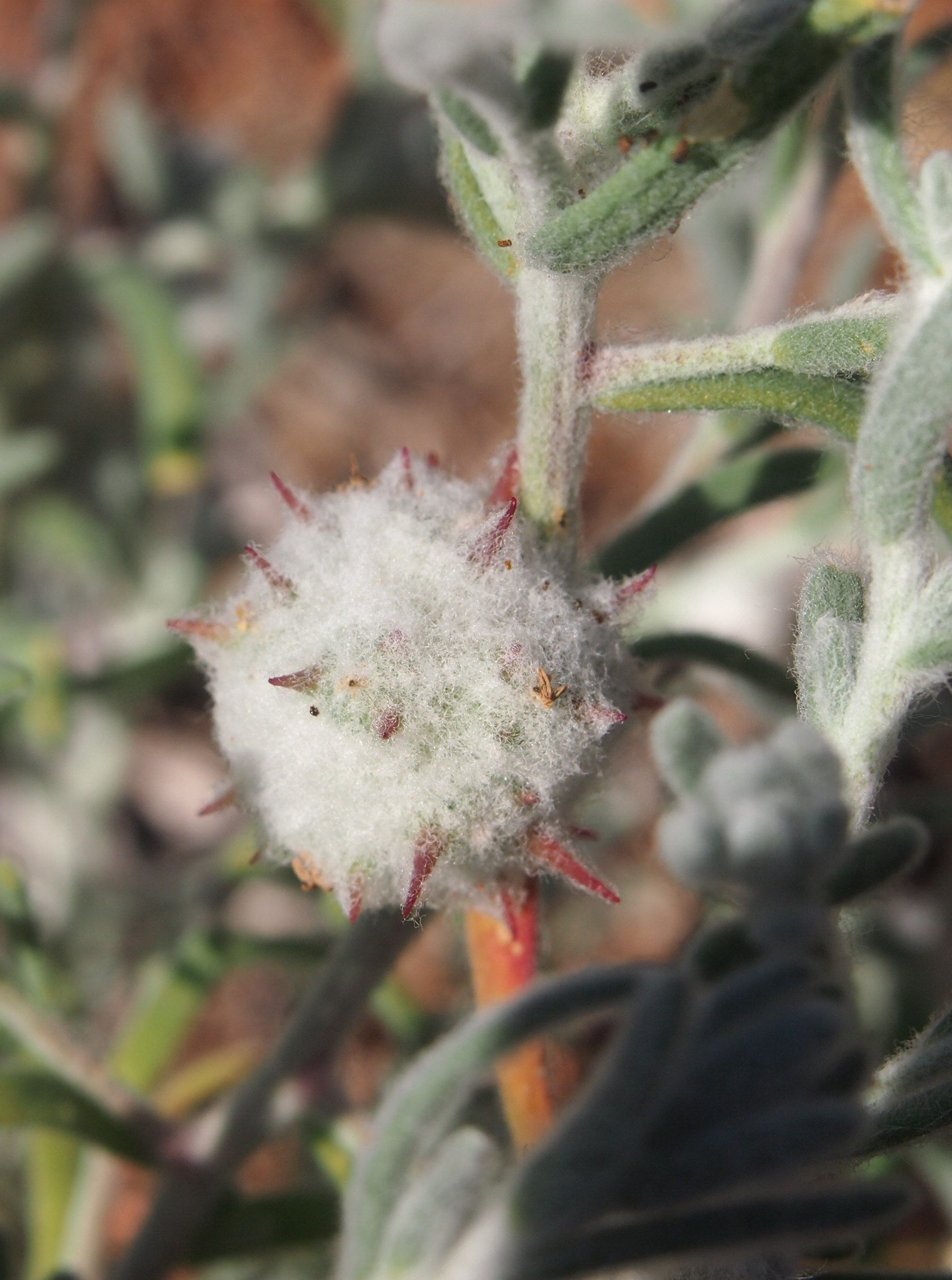

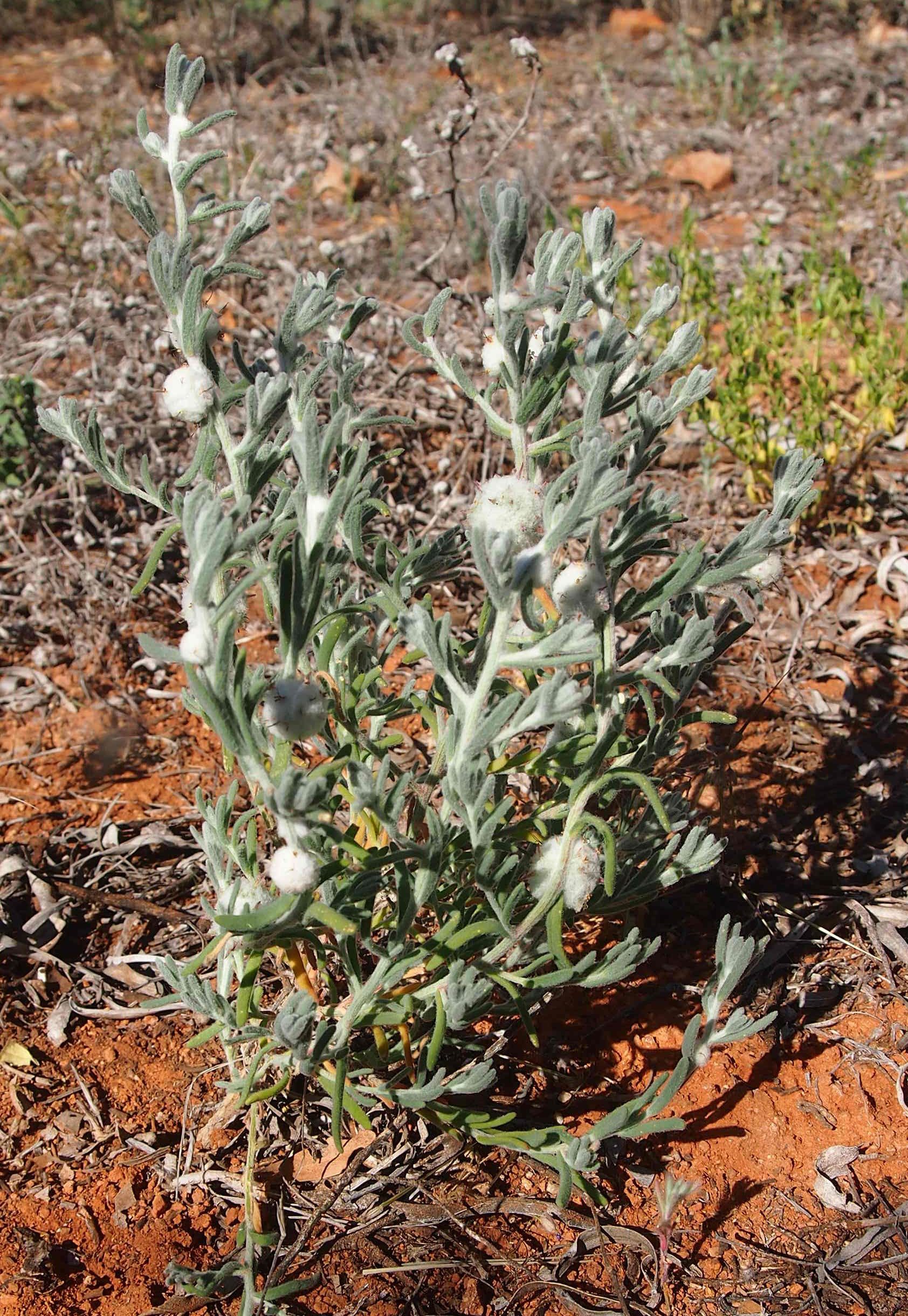

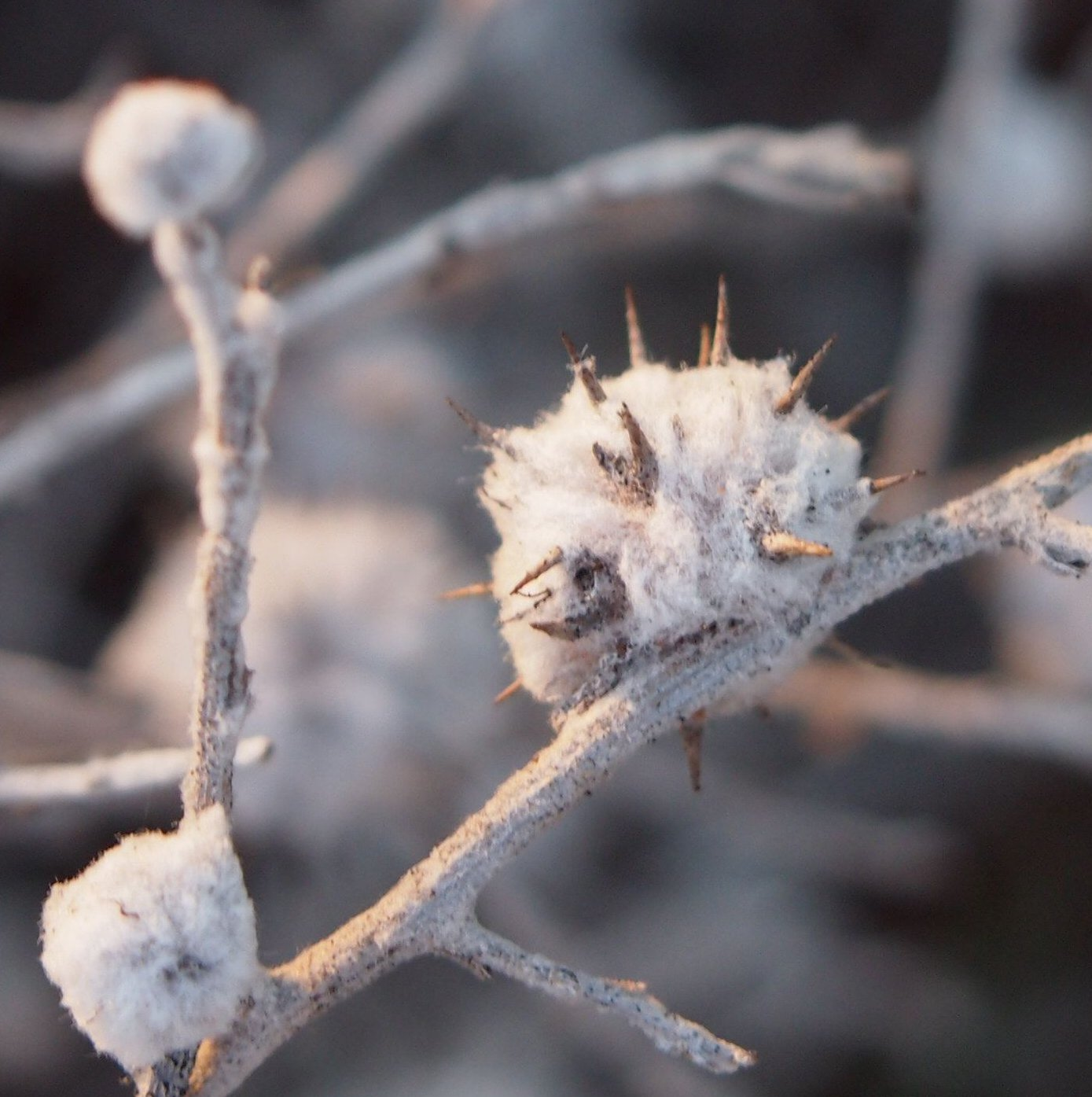

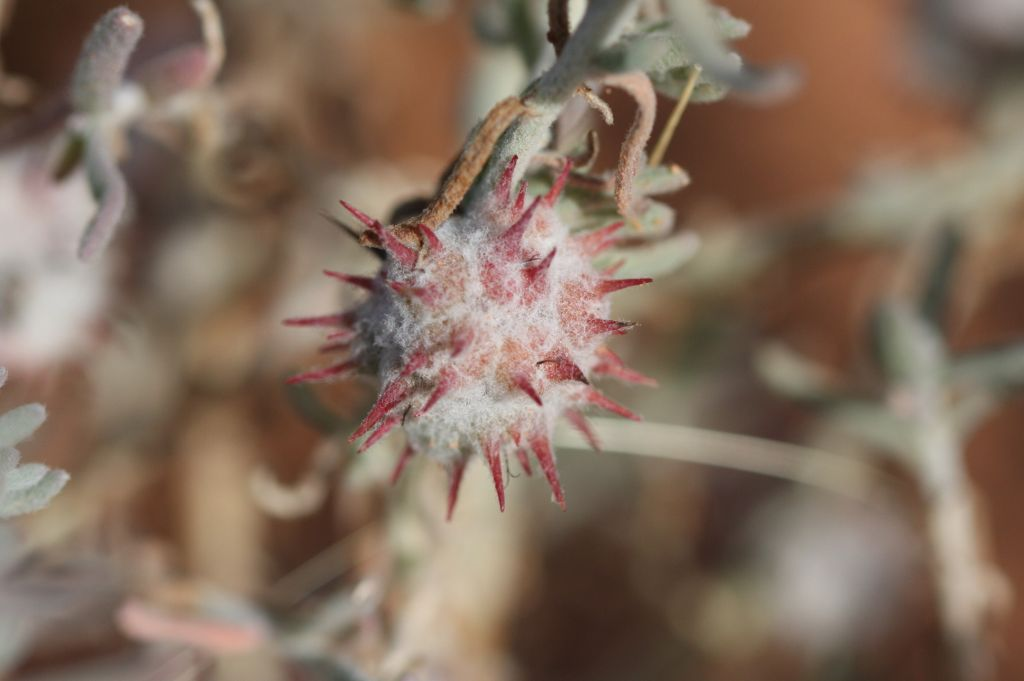
