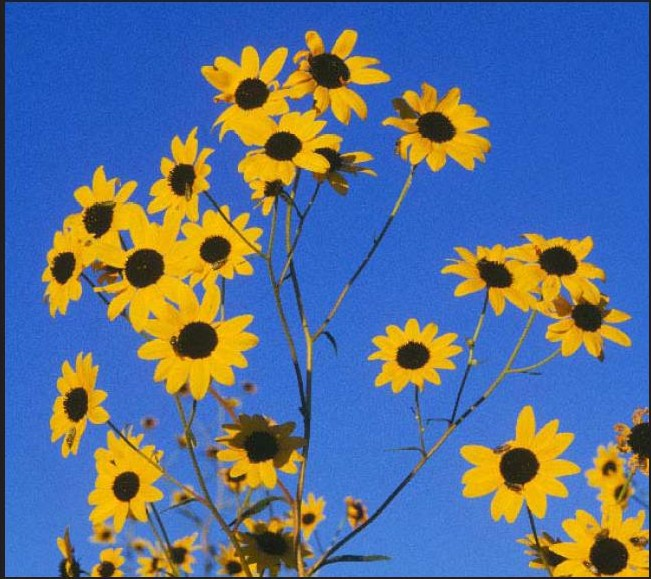

Conservation status
- Imperiled (NatureServe)

Scientific classification
- Kingdom: Plantae
- Clade: Embryophytes
- Clade: Tracheophytes
- Clade: Spermatophytes
- Clade: Angiosperms
- Clade: Eudicots
- Clade: Asterids
- Order: Asterales
- Family: Asteraceae
- Tribe: Heliantheae
- Genus: Helianthus
- Species: H. paradoxus

Binomial name
- Helianthus paradoxus Heiser

= Helianthus paradoxus =

Species of aquatic plant

Helianthus paradoxus, the paradox sunflower, puzzle sunflower or Pecos sunflower, is a threatened species of sunflower found only in west Texas, Utah, and New Mexico salt marshes by the edges of inland salt lakes and salt flats.

Helianthus paradoxus formed 75,000-208,000 years ago as a hybrid of H. annuus, the common sunflower, and Helianthus petiolaris, the prairie sunflower. The hybrid is more tolerant of salt than either parent species. Helianthus paradoxus is found in areas with salinity levels range from 10 to 40 parts per thousand. Due to its ability to withstand such high levels of salt, H. paradoxus is considered to be a halophyte.

Pecos sunflower is an annual, herbaceous plant. It grows 1–3 meters (3.3–9.8 ft) tall and is branched at the top. The leaves are opposite on the lower part of the stem but alternate at the top, lance-shaped with three prominent veins, and up to 17.5 centimeters (6.9 in) long by 8.5 cm (3.3 in) wide. The stem and leaf surfaces have a few short, stiff hairs. Flower heads are 5–7 cm (2–3 in) in diameter with bright yellow rays around a dark purplish brown center (the disc flowers). Flowers are produced in September and October, much later than many other sunflowers.

This species was added to the Endangered Species Act on October 20, 1999. It is found in spring seeps, wet meadows, pond margins, and stream courses. All these populations are dependent on natural groundwater deposits.
