= Metopides paradoxus =

Scientific classification
- Kingdom: Animalia
- Phylum: Arthropoda
- Clade: Pancrustacea
- Class: Insecta
- Order: Coleoptera
- Suborder: Polyphaga
- Infraorder: Cucujiformia
- Family: Cerambycidae
- Genus: Metopides
- Species: M. paradoxus

Binomial name
- Metopides paradoxus Hüdepohl, 1992

Species of beetle

Metopides paradoxus is a species of beetle in the family Cerambycidae. It was described by Karl-Ernst Hüdepohl in 1992. It is known from Sulawesi, Borneo and Malaysia.
