= Female sperm storage =

Retention of sperm by female after mating

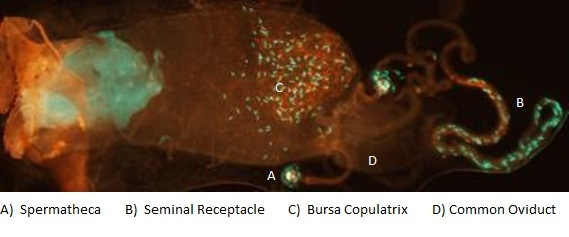
Sperm storage organs in the fruit fly Drosophila melanogaster. Female was first mated with GFP-male and then re-mated with RFP-male.

Female sperm storage is a biological process and often a type of sexual selection in which sperm cells transferred to a female during mating are temporarily retained within a specific part of the reproductive tract before the oocyte, or egg, is fertilized. This process takes place in some species of animals. The site of storage is variable among different animal taxa and ranges from structures that appear to function solely for sperm retention, such as insect spermatheca and bird sperm storage tubules (bird anatomy), to more general regions of the reproductive tract enriched with receptors to which sperm associate before fertilization, such as the caudal portion of the cow oviduct containing sperm-associating annexins. Female sperm storage is an integral stage in the reproductive process for many animals with internal fertilization. It has several documented biological functions including:

- Supporting the sperm by: a.) enabling sperm to undergo biochemical transitions, called capacitation and motility hyperactivation, in which they become physiologically capable of fertilizing an oocyte (e.g. mammals) and b.) maintaining sperm viability until an oocyte is ovulated (e.g. insects and mammals).
- Decreasing the incidence of polyspermy (e.g. some mammals such as pigs).
- Enabling mating, ovulation and/or fertilization to occur at different times or in different environments (e.g. many insects and some amphibians, reptiles, birds and mammals).
- Supporting prolonged and sustained female fertility (e.g. some insects).
- Having a role influencing offspring sex ratios among some insects possessing a haplodiploid sex-determination system (e.g. ants, bees, wasps and thrips as well as some true bugs and some beetles).
- Serving as an arena in which sperm from different mating males compete for access to oocytes, a process called sperm competition, and in which females may preferentially utilize sperm from some males over those of others, called female sperm preference or cryptic female choice (e.g. many invertebrate animals, birds and reptiles).

== Increased diversity of offspring ==
One important advantage female insects that store sperm gain is increased genetic diversity in their offspring. There are many ways that females can alter offspring genetics to increase their success and diversity. An example of how this can be accomplished is in female Scathophaga that preferentially fertilize eggs to survive in different environments. Since many environments require different traits for success, females are somehow able to match sperm (acquired from multiple mates) that have the best genes for whichever environment in which they will develop. Many of the different properties of the environment, including temperature and thermal properties affect the female's sperm choice. Studies have also shown that ovipositing is nonrandom and females lay eggs with varying PGM (phosphoglucomutase) genotypes in different environments in order to optimize offspring success. Females are acutely aware to their environment and manipulate the genetic diversity of their offspring in appropriate ways to ensure their success.

Another way sperm-storing females can alter the diversity of their offspring is controlling the relatedness to the males that provide them with sperm. Inbreeding depression can have a deleterious impact on populations of organisms and is due to mating of closely related individuals. To combat this effect, female insects appear to be able to sort out the sperm of relatives from the sperm of non-relatives to choose the best option to fertilize their eggs. Female crickets are able to preferentially store sperm of multiple unrelated males to that of their siblings; this results in more of the offspring having unrelated parentage. Being able to choose between sperm after coupling might be advantageous to females because choosing between mates precopulation may be more costly, or it may just be too difficult to tell males apart before mating. Females possess remarkable abilities to select sperm to store and to fertilize their eggs that will make their offspring diverse. Though it has been shown that a majority of female insect species can store sperm, specific examples that have been studied could include field crickets, dung flies and Mediterranean fruit flies. Females largely benefit from this mechanism, but males often can experience low fitness because their paternity is not secure.

Sperm stored often determines which male ends up fertilizing the most eggs. An example of this is seen in Red Flour Beetles, where most of the sperm is stored in the first mating. Another male can remove previously stored sperm to better chances of successful mating.

== Antagonistic coevolution ==
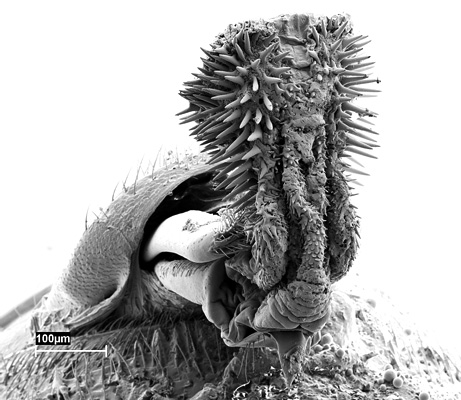
Spiny genitalia, such as of this bean weevil, may help to remove sperm from the sperm storage structures

Antagonistic coevolution is the relationship between males and females where sexual morphology changes over time to change with the opposite's sex traits in order to achieve the maximum reproductive success. One such development is alternative sperm storage sites, such as seminal receptacles, spermathecae, and pseudospermathecae, that are complex and extremely variable to allow for more choice in sperm selection. In some cases, sperm storage sites can produce proteases that break down various proteins in male seminal fluid resulting in female selection in sperm.

Like females, males have developed responses to counter evolutionary adaptations of the opposite sex. Responses in insects can vary in both genitalia and sperm structures, along with variations in behavior. Spiny male genitalia help to anchor the male to the female during copulation and remove sperm of previous males from female storage structures. Males have also developed alternative ways to copulate. In the case of the bed bug, males traumatically inseminate females, which allows faster passage of sperm to female sperm storage sites. The sperm are received by the mesospermalege and eventually reach the spermathecae, also referred to as seminal conceptacles.

At the microscopic level, Drosophila males have differing sperm tail lengths that correspond to various sizes of female seminal receptacles. Longer male sperm tail length has shown a greater reproductive success with a larger female seminal receptacle while sperm with short tail lengths have been found to be more successful in smaller seminal receptacles.

== Cryptic female choice ==
The ability to store and separate sperm from multiple males enables females to manipulate paternity by choosing which sperm fertilize their eggs, a process known as cryptic female choice. Evidence for this ability exists in many different taxa, including birds, reptiles, gastropods, arachnids, and insects. In combining long-term sperm storage with polyandrous behavior, female members of the tortoise family Testudinidae have access to sperm from a range of genetically different males and can potentially influence a clutch's paternity during each fertilization event, not just through her mating choices alone. As a result of clutches with greater variation in paternal genes and increased sperm competition, females can maximize both the genetic quality and number of offspring.

Cryptic choice allows females to preferentially choose sperm. Females are thus able to mate multiple times and allocate sperm to their eggs according to paternal phenotype, or according to other characteristics. In some cases, such as in the yellow dung fly, certain male traits will affect the fitness of eggs laid in particular environmental conditions. Females can choose sperm based on male quality as a function of its interaction with the environment. In other species, such as the fly Dryomyza anilis, females preferentially choose sperm from one storage location over another. Males of this species have developed behaviors, such as abdominal tapping, to increase their number of sperm stored in the favored storage site. Evidence for this pattern of storage, cryptic choice, and male behavior also exists in the flour beetle Tribolium castaneum. Some species, such as Egernia striolata, not only utilize sperm storage selection to improve fitness of their offspring, but to give them the upper hand in the event of sexual conflict.

== Mechanisms ==
=== Female muscular contractions ===
Muscle contraction as a means of moving spermatozoa through the reproductive system into and out of the storage structures has been examined in Diptera, Orthoptera, and Lepidoptera as well as in the species Rhodnius prolixus and the boll weevil. In R. prolixus, rhythmic peristaltic contractions of the oviduct cause contractions of the bursa copulatrix and spermatheca movement. This movement of the spermatheca results in spermatozoa migration into the spermathecal duct and into the spermatheca reservoir. In the boll weevil, contractions are also used to move sperm from the spermathecae so they can fertilize the egg. It has been observed in locusts, that the nervous system initiates female reproductive muscular contractions. In some species, such as R. prolixus, the contractions that move spermatozoa into sperm storage are initiated by a male secretion in the ejaculate. Male secretions, such as the glycoprotein ACP36D in Drosophila, can also play a role in preparing the female reproductive system for sperm storage. It causes changes in uterine shape allowing spermatozoa access to the sperm storage organs.

=== Female insect nervous system ===
The female insect nervous system affects many of the processes involved in sperm storage. The nervous system may signal for muscular contractions, fluid absorption, and hormone release, all of which aid in moving the sperm into the storage organs. When the nervous system of female fruit flies (Drosophila melanogaster) was replaced with a masculinized nervous system through genetic manipulation, sperm storage was affected suggesting that the female nervous system is unique and required to store sperm properly.

The nervous system is responsible for several fertilization methods. In the migratory locust (Locusta migratoria), the presence of an egg in the genital chamber results in an increase of spermathecal contractions. As a result, sperm is released to fertilize the egg. A neural loop (from the VIIIth ganglion through the N2B nerve to N2B2, N2B3, N2B4, and N2B6b nerves) is then activated to direct the sperm to fertilize the egg via muscular contractions. In the Caribbean fruit fly (Anastrepha suspensa), both the spermathecae and their ducts are innervated by an abdominal ganglion located under the first abdominal sternite. This location suggests that the sperm receptacle can compress and influence the amount of sperm taken in or released by the female fly.
