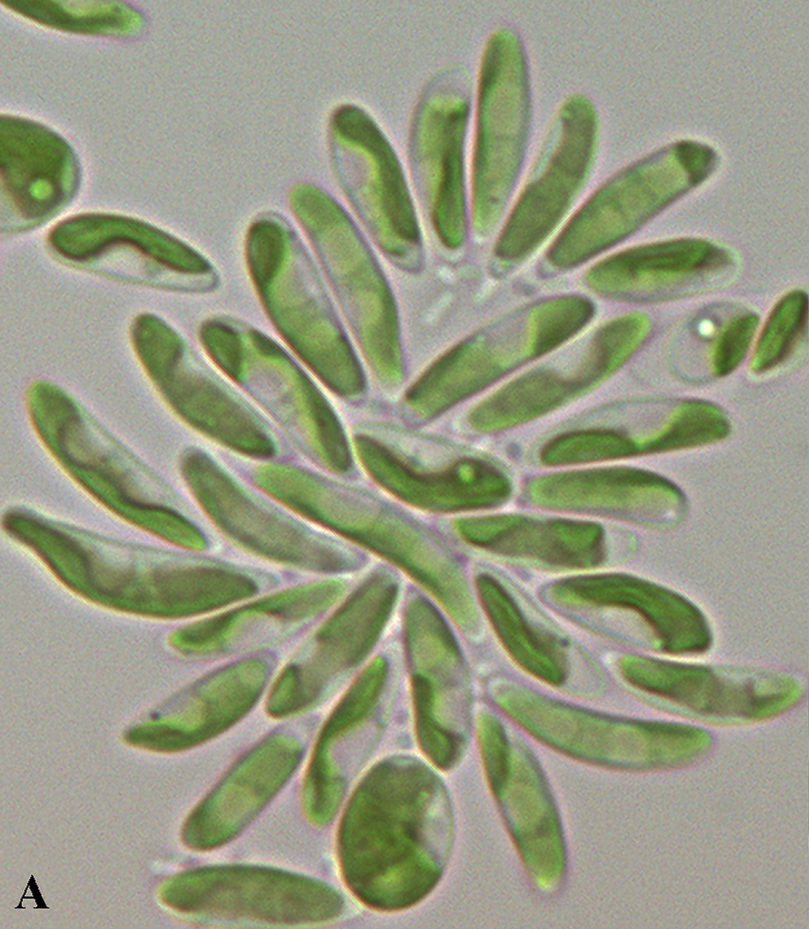
- Coccomyxa polymorpha

Scientific classification
- Kingdom: Plantae
- Division: Chlorophyta
- Class: Trebouxiophyceae
- Order: incertae sedis
- Family: Coccomyxaceae
- Genus: Coccomyxa; Schmidle, 1901

Type species
- Coccomyxa dispar Schmidle

Species
- See text

= Coccomyxa =

Genus of algae

Coccomyxa is a genus of green algae in the family Coccomyxaceae. This genus is defined by their small, elliptical to spherical shape, and the presence of a simple parietal chloroplast. These features, along with their occurrence in various lifestyles such as free-living, parasitic, or as photobionts, have been used to identify more than 40 species. Using additional morphological features, such as brown akinetes formation, allows for the differentiation between Coccomyxa and the genus Pseudococcomyxa, as they tend to share some morphological characteristics like the general cell shape and one-sided mucilage cap. Recent molecular analysis, however, indicates that the genus Pseudococcomyxa is contained within different Coccomyxa clades, signaling the fact that the two genera are the same. Coccomyxa has often been used as a model organism, and its genome is being completely sequenced. The genus is also an attractive candidate for biofuels.

== Etymology ==
Coccomyxa is a combination of two Greco-Latin roots, cocco- and -myxa. Cocco- is a Latinized form of the Greek word kokkos, meaning "berry", or "seed". This is in regards to shape, referencing that the Coccomyxa takes on an elliptical and globular structure. -myxa is a Greek term meaning "mucus", in reference to Coccomyxa's production of mucoid substances.

== Morphology ==
Coccomyxa species are relatively small in size, measuring at about 6-14 by 3-6 μm and green in colour due to the presence of chlorophyll a and b. These green algae are elliptical to globular. Their cell wall varies in thickness, from about 40-100 nm, and the cup-shaped chloroplast makes up about half of the volume of the cell. Starch grains are located around the thylakoids. The genus Coccomyxa has a simple parietal chloroplast, but lacks a pyrenoid and flagellated stages.

Coccomyxa are haplontic, meaning they spend a majority of their life cycles as haploids, and generally reproduce asexually. Reproduction occurs by the formation of 2 or 4 (sometimes up to 8) autospores.

== Habitat and ecology ==
Coccomyxa has a worldwide distribution, and are able to form biofilms, inhabiting both marine and freshwater environments. They can be dominant in certain ecosystems and display an impressive diversity in habitat, possessing lifestyles that range from free-living to parasitic. Coccomyxa has been recorded free-living in terrestrial biofilms, as soil algae, connected with mosses, planktonic in limnic ecosystems, in symbiotic associations with fungi and higher plants, and parasitic to marine mussels. There is, however, no current studies that show Coccomyxa free-living in marine environments.

Green algae have been shown to play a significant role in ecosystems. A species of Coccomyxa, Coccomyxa parasitica, has been noted as parasitizing the wild mussels from the Vigo estuary in Galicia, Spain. The aggregations of the green algae occur in the mantle, gill filaments, adductor muscle, visceral mass, and haemolymph of the species M. galloprovincialis. Species of Coccomyxa are photobiont partners in many lichens.

== Practical importance ==
Coccomyxa is often used as a model organism, as its entire genome sequence has been published. This allows for further research as Coccomyxa can serve as a frame of reference or for further experimentation. Additionally, a free living Coccomyxa species, Coccomyxa subellipsoidea C-169, was suggested to be used for biofuels, as their enzyme-digestable cell wall and lipid production gained traction for research use above other strains.

== Species list ==
- C. actinabiotis
- C. arvernensis
- C. astericola
- C. brevis
- C. chodatii
- C. confluens
- C. corbierei
- C. curvata
- C. dispar
- C. elongata
- C. flava
- C. galuniael
- C. glaronensis
- C. gloeobotrydiformis
- C. icmadophilae
- C. litoralis
- C. melkonianii
- C. mucigena
- C. naegeliana
- C. olivacea
- C. ophiura
- C. ovalis
- C. pallescens
- C. parasitica
- C. peltigerae
- C. peltigerae variolosae
- C. polymorpha
- C. rayssiae
- C. scabra
- C. solorinae
- C. solorinae bisporae
- C. solorinae saccatae
- C. solorinae-crocae
- C. subellipsoida
- C. subglobosa
- C. subsphaerica
- C. terrestris
- C. thallosa
- C. vinatzeri
- C. viridis
