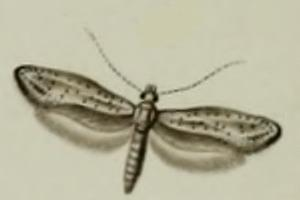
- Paradoxus osyridellus

Scientific classification
- Kingdom: Animalia
- Phylum: Arthropoda
- Class: Insecta
- Order: Lepidoptera
- Family: Yponomeutidae
- Subfamily: Yponomeutinae
- Genus: Paradoxus; Millière, 1869

Species
- See text

= Paradoxus =

Genus of moths

Paradoxus is a genus of moths of the family Yponomeutidae.

== Species ==
- Paradoxus caucasica - Friese, 1960
- Paradoxus osyridellus - Milliére, 1869
