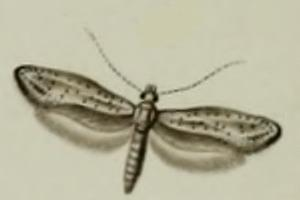

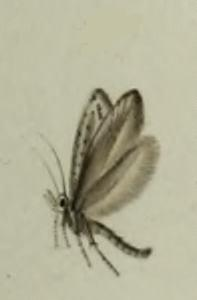

Scientific classification
- Kingdom: Animalia
- Phylum: Arthropoda
- Clade: Pancrustacea
- Class: Insecta
- Order: Lepidoptera
- Family: Yponomeutidae
- Genus: Paradoxus
- Species: P. osyridellus

Binomial name
- Paradoxus osyridellus Stainton, 1869

= Paradoxus osyridellus =

Species of moth

Paradoxus osyridellus is a moth of the family Yponomeutidae. It is found in France, Spain, Portugal, Croatia, Greece Mexico and on Sardinia.

The larvae feed on olives, injuring the tender shoots.

== Gallery ==
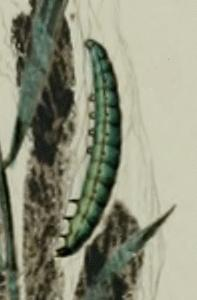
Larva

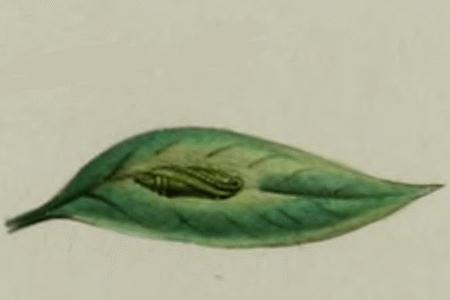
Pupa

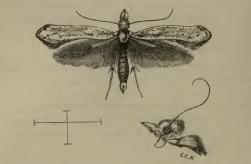
Adult
