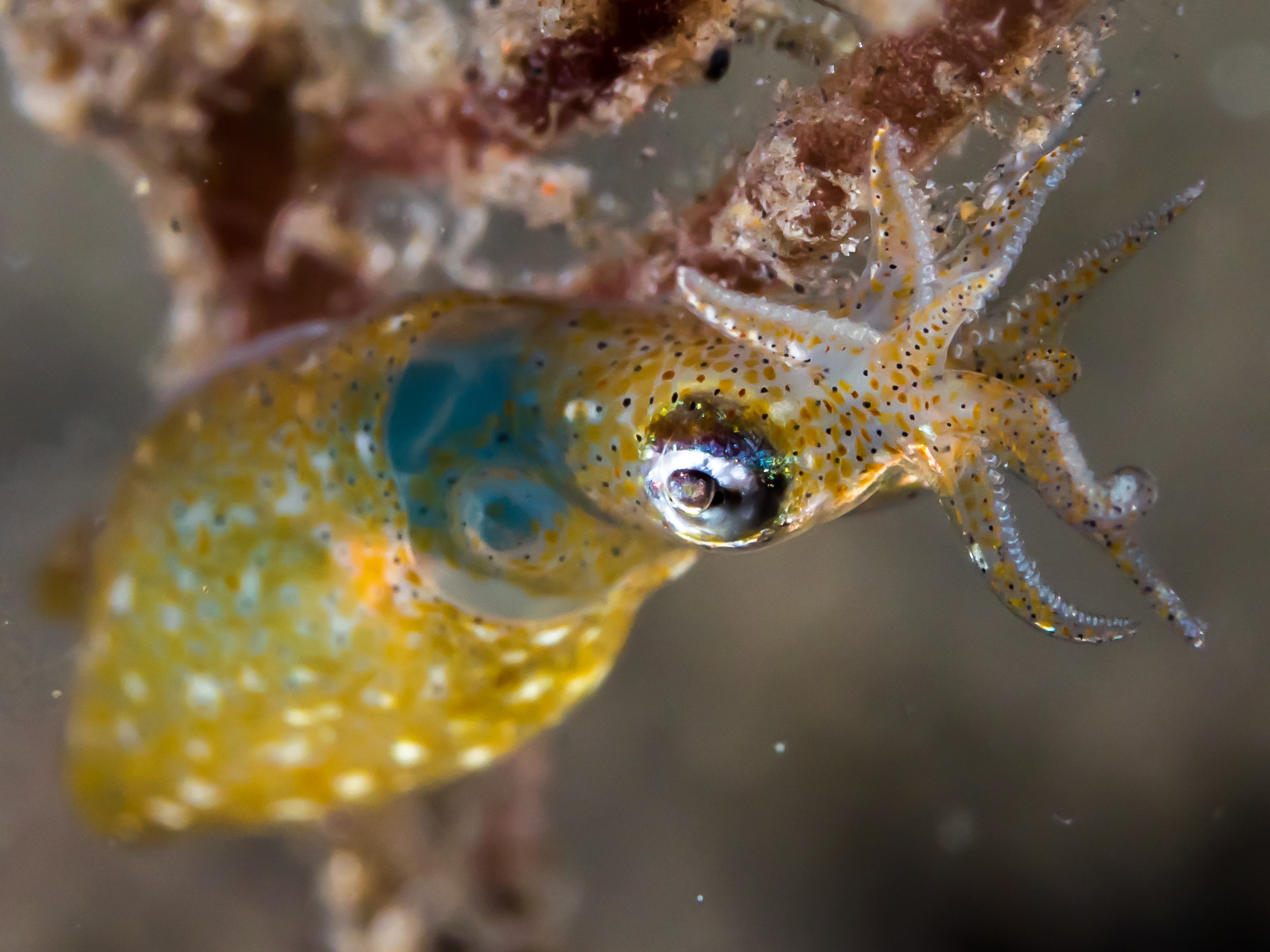
- Idiosepius pygmaeus

Scientific classification
- Kingdom: Animalia
- Phylum: Mollusca
- Class: Cephalopoda
- Superorder: Decapodiformes
- Order: Idiosepida
- Superfamily: Idiosepioidea; Appellöf, 1898
- Family: Idiosepiidae; Appellöf, 1898

= Idiosepiidae =

Family of molluscs

Idiosepiidae, also known as the pygmy squids, is a family of squids in the superorder Decapodiformes. They are the smallest known squids.

It is the only family in the monotypic order Idiosepida and the monotypic superfamily Idiosepioidea. Phylogenomic analyses have shown that species in the family Idiosepiidae are sister to all other Decapodiformes.

== Description ==
Idiosepiidae are the smallest known squids: males can grow to about 15 mm (0.6 in) and females to about 21 mm (0.8 in) in mantle length. The mantle is elongate, obovate to cigar-shaped, with its posterior margin bluntly pointed at the distal tip. Their internal chitinous shell is vestigial, and the dorsal surface of the mantle has a unique oval adhesive organ, which secretes a sticky substance and is used to attach itself to seaweed or seagrass blades. The head is prominent while the arms are short. In males, both ventral arms are differentiated, but they are also different from each other. Females are generally larger and achieve sexual maturity later than males.

== Distribution and ecology ==
Idiosepiidae have an Indo-west Pacific distribution, from South Africa in the west to Japan and Russia in the east. They appear to be short-lived and have multiple generations per year. In temperate climates their population declines at the end of the warm season. They generally live in shallow water among seagrass and mangroves. They often adhere themselves to substrate, enabling camouflage and concealment during the day. They are solitary. Mating is promiscuous with multiple matings. Young individuals are planktonic. They appear to be sit-and-wait predators. They feed mainly on small crustaceans like Latreutes acicularis.

== Genera ==
The following genera are recognised in the family Idiosepiidae:

- Idiosepius Steenstrup, 1881
- Kodama Reid, Sato, Jolly & Strugnell, 2023
- Xipholeptos Reid & Strugnell, 2018
