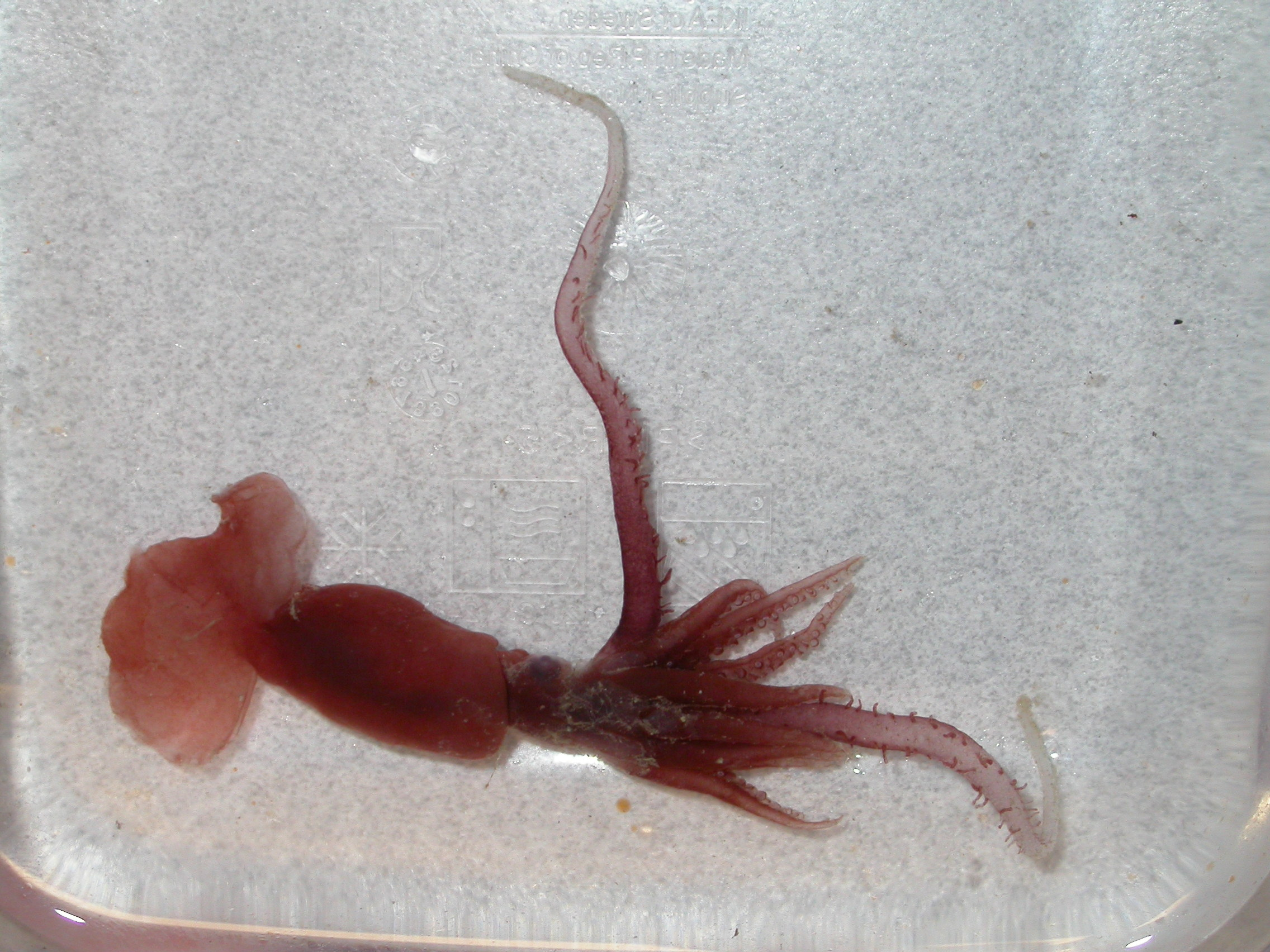
- The third known specimen of P. sloani, collected during the summer 2009 cruise of the NOAA ship Henry B. Bigelow

Conservation status
- Data Deficient (IUCN 3.1)

Scientific classification
- Kingdom: Animalia
- Phylum: Mollusca
- Class: Cephalopoda
- Order: Oegopsida
- Family: Promachoteuthidae
- Genus: Promachoteuthis
- Species: P. sloani

Binomial name
- Promachoteuthis sloani Young, Vecchione & Piatkowski, 2006

= Promachoteuthis sloani =

Species of squid

Promachoteuthis sloani is a species of squid from the northern Atlantic Ocean. It was known from only three dead specimens until 2024 when a live specimen was observed and photographed in the Nazca Ridge. Very little is understood of its biology. P. sloani is characterised by several morphological features: nuchal fusion is absent between the head and mantle, the arms generally bear 3–4 series of suckers, and papillae are present on the tentacles.

The holotype is an immature female of 58 mm mantle length (ML) in near-perfect condition. It was caught by R/V G.O. SARS in 2004 at 53°05′N 36°46′W. The paratype, an immature female, is larger at 102 mm ML. It was caught by R/V Walther Herwig in 1973 at 46°00′N 15°49′W. Both were trawled in nets that fished to depths greater than 2,650 m.
