= Yezoteuthis =

Yezoteuthis Temporal range: Campanian, 77 Ma

Scientific classification
- Kingdom: Animalia
- Phylum: Mollusca
- Class: Cephalopoda
- Order: Oegopsida
- Genus: †Yezoteuthis; Tanabe, Hikida & Iba, 2006
- Species: †Y. giganteus

Binomial name
- †Yezoteuthis giganteus Tanabe, Hikida & Iba, 2006

Extinct genus of squids

Yezoteuthis ("Yezo squid") is an extinct genus of very large oegopsid squid that inhabited the seas around Japan in the Late Cretaceous period. It contains a single species, Y. giganteus from the early Campanian Osousyunai Formation of the Yezo Group in Hokkaido. It is possibly the largest fossil coleoid ever described.

Yezoteuthis is known from a single upper jaw that shares close similarities with those of oegopsids, hence its assignment to that order. These jaws are very large, and a comparison to modern squid indicates that Yezoteuthis would have rivalled the extant giant squid (Architeuthis) in size, reaching about 1.7 metres (5.6 ft) in mantle length, and more than 5 metres (16 ft) in total length. Yezoteuthis was likely a major predator of its ecosystem and existed at a high trophic level.

A second set of oegopsid jaws closely resembling those of Yezoteuthis was described from the Yezo Group in 2023, but was found to be even larger and have different proportions of those from Yezoteuthis, indicating that it is a different species, with its genus also remaining uncertain. Yezoteuthis also coexisted with the slightly smaller but still very large oegopsid Haboroteuthis, although it is possible that Haboroteuthis may be conspecific with Yezoteuthis.
