= Promachoteuthis sulcus =

Conservation status
- Data Deficient (IUCN 3.1)

Scientific classification
- Kingdom: Animalia
- Phylum: Mollusca
- Class: Cephalopoda
- Order: Oegopsida
- Family: Promachoteuthidae
- Genus: Promachoteuthis
- Species: P. sulcus

Binomial name
- Promachoteuthis sulcus Young, Vecchione & Roper, 2007

Species of cephalopod

Promachoteuthis sulcus is a species of promachoteuthid squid. It is distinguished from related taxa on the basis of several morphological features: Nuchal fusion between the head and mantle, much larger size of arm-suckers compared to club-suckers, greater width of tentacle-base than arm-base, a recessed club-base, and the presence of an aboral tentacle-groove. A notable defining feature is the presence of appendages that resemble human teeth where its mouth is located. It is unknown what these are used for.

Promachoteuthis sulcus is known from a single specimen caught by the German research vessel R/V Walther Herwig in an open net off Tristan da Cunha, southern Atlantic Ocean (36°49′S 12°17′W), at a depth of 1,750–2,000 m (5,740–6,560 ft).
