= Promachoteuthis megaptera =

Conservation status
- Data Deficient (IUCN 3.1)

Scientific classification
- Kingdom: Animalia
- Phylum: Mollusca
- Class: Cephalopoda
- Order: Oegopsida
- Family: Promachoteuthidae
- Genus: Promachoteuthis
- Species: P. megaptera

Binomial name
- Promachoteuthis megaptera Hoyle, 1885

Species of squid

Promachoteuthis megaptera is a small, rare squid found in the Pacific Ocean near Japan.
