= Suckerin =

Type of copolymer-type protein that forms the teeth of cepahlopods

Identifiers
- Organism: Dosidicus gigas
- Symbol: Suckerin-1
- UniProt: A0A081DU69
Search for
- Structures: Swiss-model
- Domains: InterPro

Suckerins are a type of block copolymer protein that forms the teeth of sucker rings and beaks of cephalopods. These biopolymers form exhibit high elastic modulus and thermoplastic behavior.

== Properties ==
Suckerin proteins have a size range from 5-60kDA with an isoelectric point of pl 7–10.

== Applications ==
Suckerin has a structure similar to spider silk. In the future it could be used to make medical tools, specialty bandages, sutures and artificial ligaments. Additionally, it could be used for commercial and industrial products such as well as body armor, parachutes, sails and airplane components. Compared to other natural protein-based materials, suckerins offer advantages in terms of mechanical strength, the ability to form robust supramolecular structures, biocompatibility, excellent thermoplastic property and underwater adhesion, making them suitable for wound healing and various biomedical applications.
