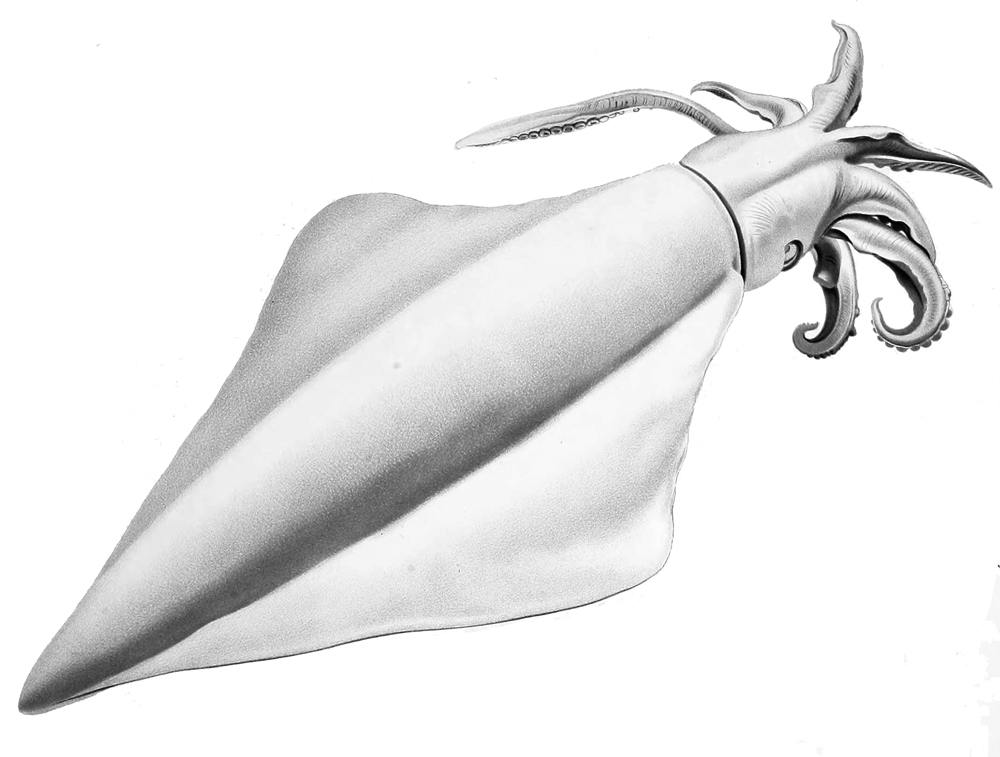

Conservation status
- Least Concern (IUCN 3.1)

Scientific classification
- Kingdom: Animalia
- Phylum: Mollusca
- Class: Cephalopoda
- Order: Oegopsida
- Family: Thysanoteuthidae
- Genus: Thysanoteuthis
- Species: T. rhombus

Binomial name
- Thysanoteuthis rhombus Troschel, 1857

Synonyms
- Cirrobrachium filiferum Hoyle, 1904; Cirrobranchium danae Joubin, 1933; Cirrobranchium filiferum Hoyle, 1904; Sepioteuthis major Gray, 1828; Thysanoteuthis danae (Joubin, 1933); Thysanoteuthis elegans Troschel, 1857; Thysanoteuthis nuchalis Pfeffer, 1912

= Thysanoteuthis rhombus =

Diamond squid

Species of cephalopod

Thysanoteuthis rhombus, also known as the diamond squid, diamondback squid, or rhomboid squid, is a large species of squid from the family Thysanoteuthidae which is found worldwide, throughout tropical and subtropical waters. T. rhombus is given its name for the appearance of the fins that run the length of the mantle. They are a fast growing species with a lifespan of approximately 1 year. The diamond squid is the only cephalopod species known to be monogamous. T. rhombus often preys on fish and other small cephalopods at varying water depths. This species is commercially fished in Japan, specifically in the Sea of Japan and Okinawa.

== Description ==
Thysanoteuthis rhombus are distinguishable by the presence of arms with two series of suckers, whereas the tentacular clubs have four. It lacks photophores. T. rhombus is named for its fins, which run in equal length along the mantle, giving the appearance of a rhombus. The species is able to grow up to 100 centimetres (39 in) in mantle length and a maximum weight of 30 kilograms (66 lb), although it averages around 20 kilograms (44 lb).

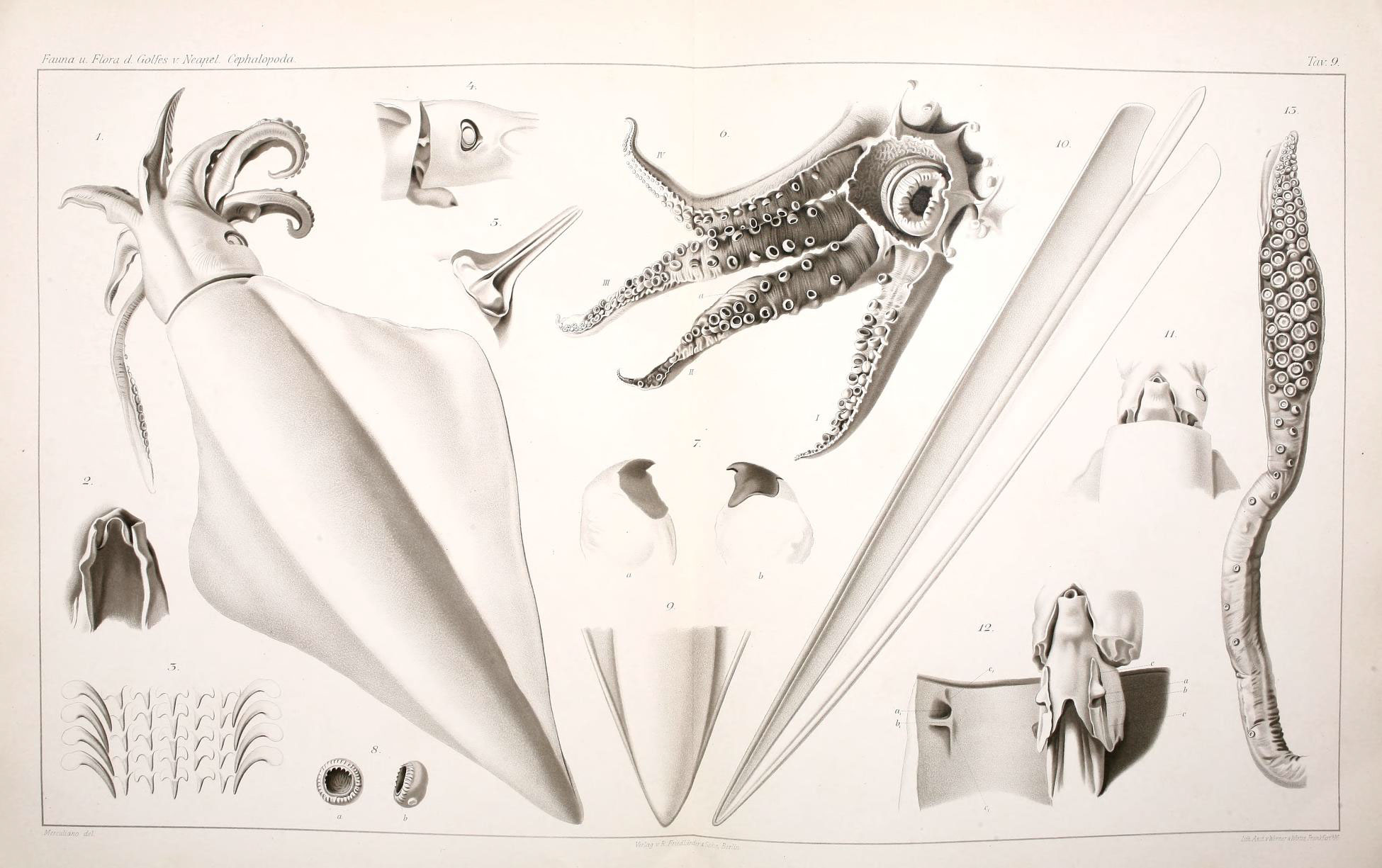
T. rhombus in the Gulf of Naples.

The lifespan of T. rhombus is 1 year. Males mature at a mantle length between 400–550 millimetres (16–22 in) (170 to 200 days of age) while females mature at a mantle length between 550–650 millimetres (22–26 in) (230 to 250 days).

== Biology ==
T. rhombus typically inhabits open ocean waters of the subtropical and tropical locations with temperatures of 20 °C (68 °F). T. rhombus is not an active swimmer and propels itself slowly using its triangular fins, although the species is able to make powerful contractions of its mantle to escape predation (jet propulsion). The diamond squid was found to be largely inactive or even die to sudden drops in temperatures, which went below 15 °C (59 °F) This species feeds during the daytime at deep water levels and during the night at shallow water levels (Diel vertical migration). T. rhombus are often found in pairs, but groups up to 20 have been recorded.

=== Ecology ===
==== Diet ====
In subsurface water levels, T. rhombus juveniles were found to feed on crustaceans, small cephalopods and fishes. As adults, the stomach contents of the Diamond squid were found to consist mostly of nonactive fishes at water depths of 400–650 metres (1,310–2,130 ft).

==== Predation ====
The predators that feed on T. rhombus include various species of ommastrephid squids, giant squid (Architeuthis dux), dolphinfish (Coryphaena hippurus), lancetfish (Alepisaurus sp.), tuna, swordfish (Xiphias gladius), snake mackerel (Gempylus serpens), and sharks. Other predators include cetaceans; oceanic dolphins such as rough-toothed dolphins (Steno bredanensis) and false killer whales (Pseudorca crassidens), along with sperm whales (Physeter macrocephalus), prey on diamond squid.

=== Reproduction ===
T. rhombus has a relatively low population density, which has led to a unique situation among squids, where male and female couples of the same size remain together from their juvenile stage until death; this species is monogamous.

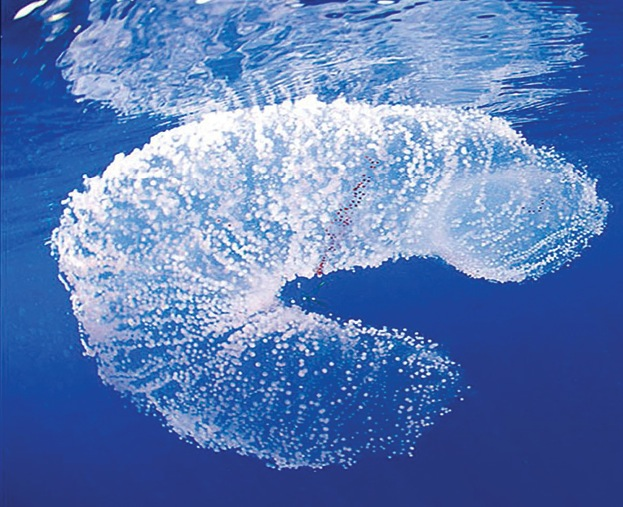
Thysanoteuthis rhombus egg mass (diameter ca. 1m) in the waters between Tenerife and La Gomera.

The pairing of males and females occurs at an immature stage where mantle length is less than 100 millimetres (3.9 in) and pairs remain monogamous. Mating occurs in a head-to-head position, in which the male uses his hectocotylus to attach to the female's buccal membrane to transfer his spermatophores. Spawning is year round in tropical waters and lasts for 2–3 months, but in temperate regions spawning is restricted to summer or early autumn periods and warmer currents. T. rhombus is known to be an intermittent spawner and is known to have multiple spawning in succession. During spawning, females will produce secretions of gel-like substance from nidamental glands, similar to the Japanese flying squid, that will enter the water and swell; this engorged secretion will then be molded by the female into a cylinder. Her oviductal glands will then begin to form two mucous threads, each with one row of eggs, which will fuse into a single cord containing a double row of eggs in the mantle cavity. The fused egg-cord or mass is expelled into the water through the funnel where the eggs are fertilized with spermatozoa that were attached to the female's buccal membrane, in her seminal receptacles. The fertilized egg cord is then wound onto the cylinder. A female can produce 8 to 12 egg-masses if properly utilizing its vitelline oocytes.

== Commercial value ==
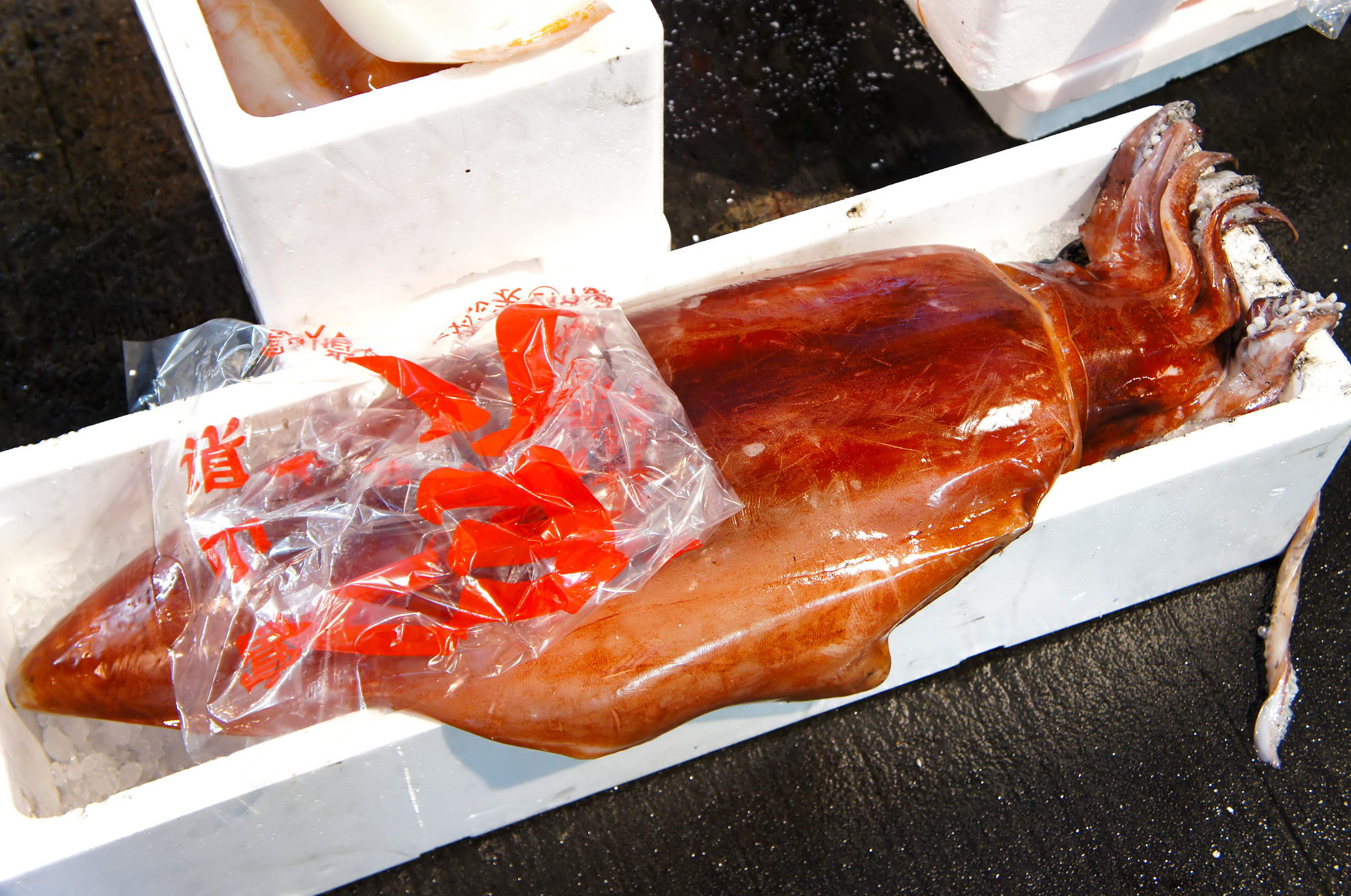
Being sold at Ota Market, Tokyo

T. rhombus is targeted by growing fisheries in near southern and central Japan due to its firm and flavorful flesh. The main fishing grounds are in the Sea of Japan, Okinawa Prefecture, and Kagoshima Prefecture; the majority (~90%) of captures are located in the Sea of Japan and Okinawa. The Sea of Japan fishery runs from July to February, while the fishery in Okinawa runs primarily between November and April. To capture the diamond squid in the Sea of Japan, inshore trap nets and free-floating angling gear called "taru-nagashi" are used. In Okinawa, free-floating angling gear called "Hata-nagashi" is used for capture.

"Taru-nagashi" is gear that consists of a vertical weighted long line with two or three artificial lures and with two or three rows of stainless steel hooks. At the other end of the line, an orange fluorescent buoy lays on its side on the surface until a squid hooks onto the line, which causes the buoy to stand up and alert the fisherman. The caught squid are pulled up by hand or by using a winch, so it is primarily used during the day. "Hata-nagashi" is gear that was adapted for the oceanographic conditions of Okinawa Prefecture. It has several artificial lures attached to a longer main line than those used in the Sea of Japan. The line is attached to several buoys and a flag at the surface. This gear lead to the increase of catches of T. rhombus.

== See also ==
- Cephalopod size
- Humboldt squid, another large species with its own dedicated fishery
