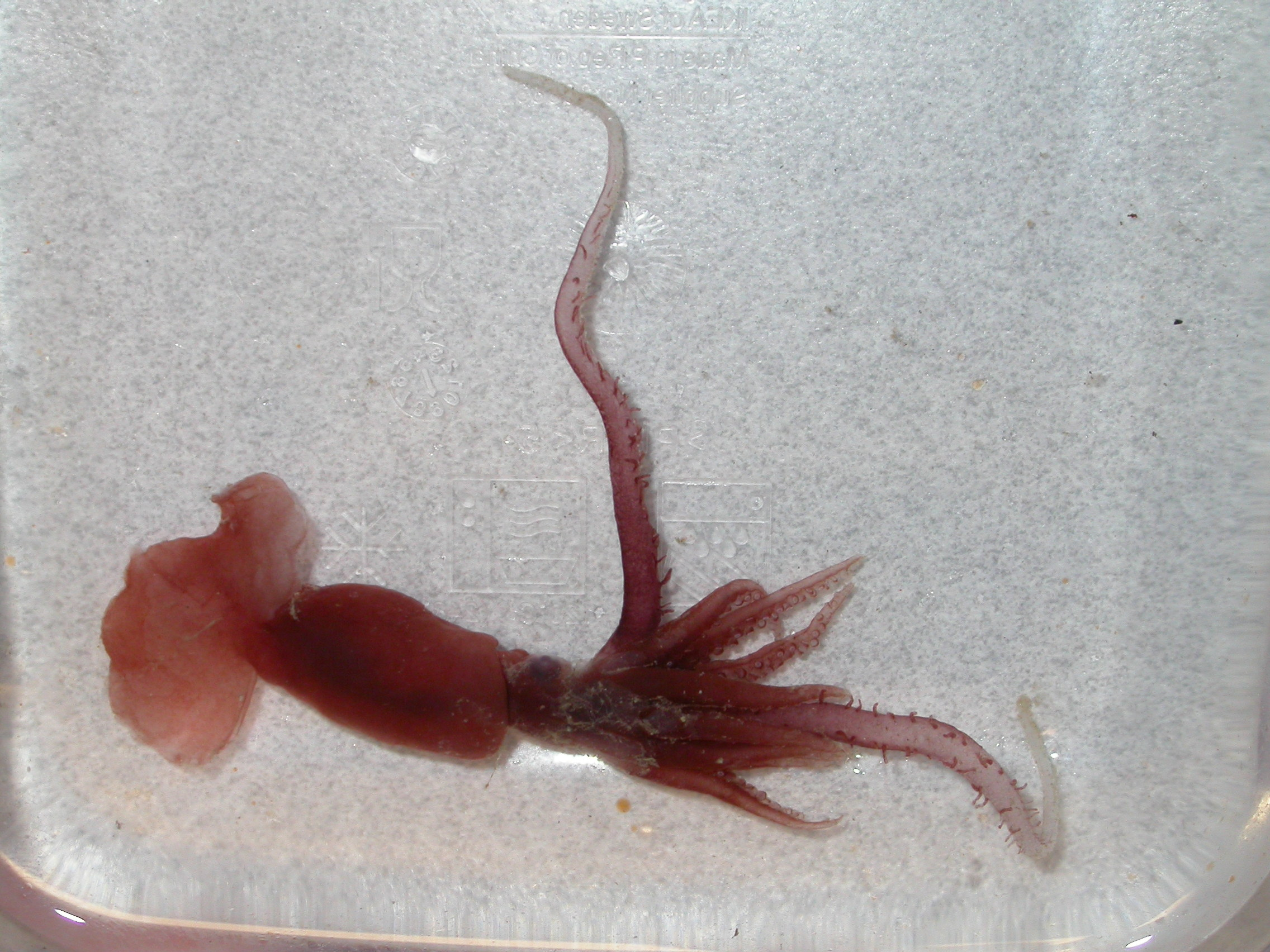
- Promachoteuthis sloani

Scientific classification
- Kingdom: Animalia
- Phylum: Mollusca
- Class: Cephalopoda
- Order: Oegopsida
- Superfamily: Chiroteuthoidea
- Family: Promachoteuthidae; Naef, 1912
- Genus: Promachoteuthis; Hoyle, 1885

Type species
- Promachoteuthis megaptera Hoyle, 1885

Species
- Promachoteuthis megaptera Promachoteuthis sloani Promachoteuthis sulcus

= Promachoteuthis =

Genus of squids

Promachoteuthis is a genus of small, weakly-muscled squid found at bathypelagic depths. Three species have been formally described, while another two await description. Promachoteuthis ranges in size from 10.5mm to 104mm. They can be found in waters as deep as 1550 to 3431 meters. Promachoteuthis possesses eight arms and two longer tentacles, each equipped with suckers.
