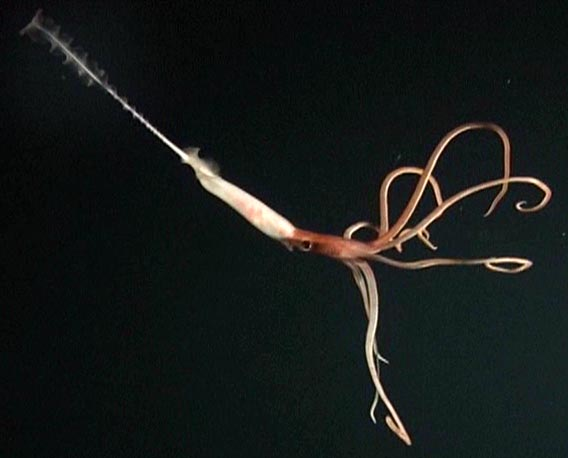

Conservation status
- Least Concern (IUCN 3.1)

Scientific classification
- Kingdom: Animalia
- Phylum: Mollusca
- Class: Cephalopoda
- Order: Oegopsida
- Superfamily: Chiroteuthoidea
- Family: Joubiniteuthidae; Naef, 1922
- Genus: Joubiniteuthis; Berry, 1920
- Species: J. portieri

Binomial name
- Joubiniteuthis portieri (Joubin, 1916)

Synonyms
- Chiroteuthis portieri Joubin, 1916; Valdemaria danae [Joubin, 1931)

= Joubiniteuthis =

Joubin's squid

Species of squid

Joubiniteuthis portieri, also known as Joubin's squid from the monotypic family Joubiniteuthidae and genus Joubiniteuthis. It is a rare, small squid which occurs in the mesopelagic to bathypelagic zones and which has a worldwide distribution in tropical and subtropical regions. It is a distinctive squid having long arms which have numerous small suckers in six rows. There is little known about its biology. It is thought that it stays in the depths of the ocean with its arms outstretched, waiting for small animals to ensnare after they have accidentally swum into the arms. This species is named after Louis Joubin, a French zoologist. It is known to reach a mantle length of 9 cm (3.5 in).

It is the closest relative of the bizarre, famous bigfin squids (genus Magnapinna). The Joubin's squid has been sighted most recently by Schmidt Ocean Institute, but was first found at the northwest Hawaiian islands on a 2003 NOAA (National Oceanic and Atmospheric Administration) expedition which was first believed to be one of if not the best pieces of footage of the squid in its natural habitat.
