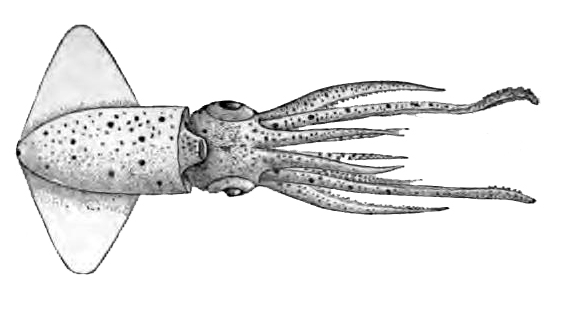

Conservation status
- Least Concern (IUCN 3.1)

Scientific classification
- Kingdom: Animalia
- Phylum: Mollusca
- Class: Cephalopoda
- Order: Oegopsida
- Superfamily: Enoploteuthoidea
- Family: Ancistrocheiridae; Pfeffer, 1912
- Genus: Ancistrocheirus; Gray, 1849
- Species: A. lesueurii

Binomial name
- Ancistrocheirus lesueurii (D'Orbigny, 1842)

Synonyms
- Abralia megalops Verrill, 1882; Ancistroteuthis lesueurii (d'Orbigny, 1842); Enoploteuthis lesueurii d'Orbigny, 1842; Enoploteuthis pallida Pfeffer, 1884; Enoploteuthis polyonyx Troschel, 1857; Loligo alessandrinii Vérany, 1847; Onychia caribaea Steenstrup, 1880; Onychoteuthis lesueurii Férussac, 1835; Thelidioteuthis alessandrinii (Vérany, 1847); Ancistrocheirus alessandrinii (Verany, 1851)

= Ancistrocheirus =

Sharpear enope squid

Genus of squids

Ancistrocheirus lesueurii, the sharpear enope squid, is the only species in the genus Ancistrocheirus and family Ancistrocheiridae. With a mantle length of 25 cm (9.8 in), this moderately sized squid may be found throughout the tropical and subtropical oceans. They tend to be found at mesopelagic depths (200–1,000 m (660–3,280 ft) down).

Although only one species is recognized, some have suggested more than one species may exist due to differences in the paralarval morphology. Paralarva is the first free-living stage for cephalopods.

== Characteristics ==
The buccal crown of the sharpear enope squid is heavily pigmented. The squid has no vesicles. There are hooks on all its arms. The suckers are absent from its manus and the squid's dactylus is reduced.

=== Photophores ===
Photophores occur throughout its body. Large photophores are present on its head, funnel, base of arms, and tentacular stalk. Other photophores are present on the ventral surface of its mantle (usually 22), with numerous very small photophores on its head, funnel, base of arms II and tentacular stalk. Mature males have large photophores on tips of arms IV opposite the mouth. Mature females have photophores on tips of their dorsal six arms. The number of large photopores on the squid's mantle increases as it matures.

== Ecology ==
They are eaten by the sperm whale in Southeast Asia and the Galapagos waters
