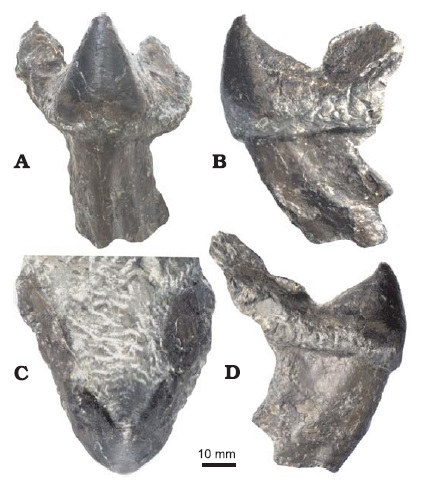
- Haboroteuthis poseidon, holotype, a lower jaw. Frontal (A), left lateral (B), dorsal (C), and right lateral (D) views

Scientific classification
- Domain: Eukaryota
- Kingdom: Animalia
- Phylum: Mollusca
- Class: Cephalopoda
- Order: Teuthida
- (unranked): incertae sedis
- Genus: †Haboroteuthis; Kazushige Tanabe, Akihiro Misaki, and Takao Ubukata 2015

= Haboroteuthis =

Haboroteuthis Temporal range: Santonian

Extinct genus of squids

Haboroteuthis is an extinct genus of squid that lived during the Cretaceous period. The only species that has been classified in the genus is H. poseidon.
