= Batoteuthis =

Bush-club squid

Conservation status
- Least Concern (IUCN 3.1)

Scientific classification
- Kingdom: Animalia
- Phylum: Mollusca
- Class: Cephalopoda
- Order: Oegopsida
- Superfamily: Chiroteuthoidea
- Family: Batoteuthidae; Young & Roper, 1968
- Genus: Batoteuthis; Young & Roper, 1968
- Species: B. skolops

Binomial name
- Batoteuthis skolops Young & Roper, 1968

Genus of squids

Batoteuthis skolops, the bush-club squid, is the single rare species in genus Batoteuthis, which is the only genus in family Batoteuthidae. The squid is found in Antarctic waters, and reaches a mantle length of at least 350 mm (14 in). Some features of this creature are a small head, a long tail and a very peculiar tentacle, with six series of suckers on the club.

The genus contains bioluminescent species.

== Distribution ==
B. skolops occurs in the Southern Ocean. Its range may be circumpolar with a strict Antarctic distribution and it may live in bathypelagic depths.

== Ecology ==
This squid is eaten by several predators in the Southern Ocean, like albatrosses and sperm whales.

Their diet is unknown, but ^{15}N ratios showed high values in their tissues which point towards either a high trophic level, or living in great depths (or both).
