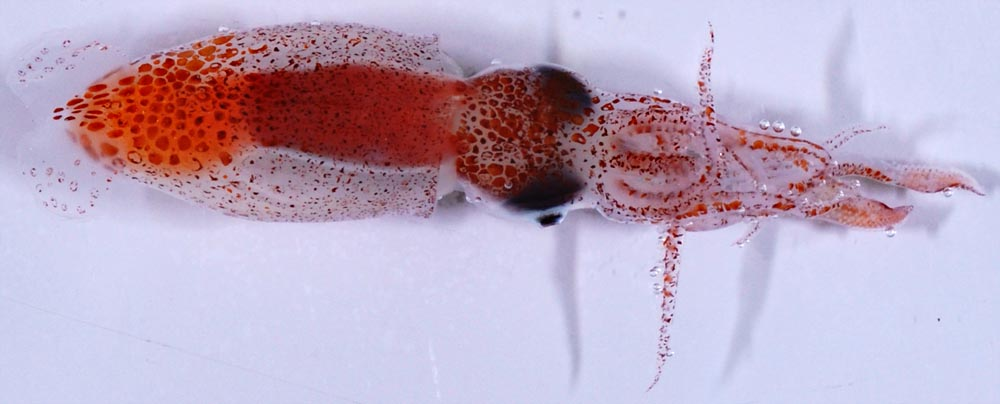
- Psychroteuthis glacialis paralarva (<2 cm ML) from the Ross Sea of Antarctica
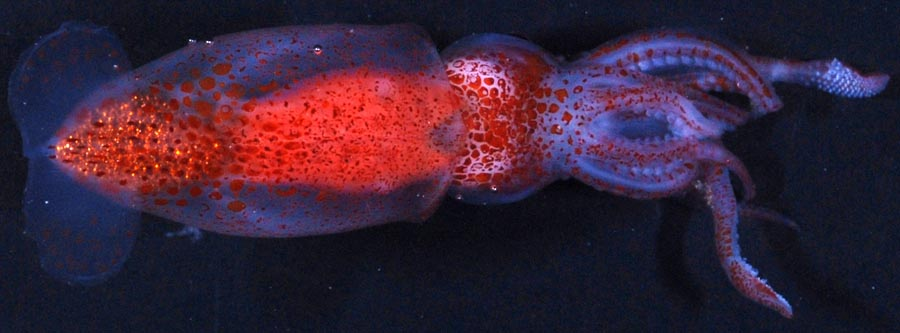
- Another view of the same specimen

Conservation status
- Least Concern (IUCN 3.1)

Scientific classification
- Kingdom: Animalia
- Phylum: Mollusca
- Class: Cephalopoda
- Order: Oegopsida
- Family: Psychroteuthidae; Thiele, 1920
- Genus: Psychroteuthis; Thiele, 1920
- Species: P. glacialis

Binomial name
- Psychroteuthis glacialis Thiele, 1920

= Psychroteuthis glacialis =

Glacial squid

Species of squid

Psychroteuthis glacialis, the glacial squid, is the only known species in the monotypic genus Psychroteuthis, in the family Psychroteuthidae. While only one species has been confirmed, two undescribed species also probably exist. The species occurs in coastal waters near Antarctica and South America. It grows to a mantle length of 44 cm (1.44 ft).

== Ecology ==
P. glacialis is known to feed on many crustaceans, fish, lanternfish, Antarctic krill, and Antarctic silverfish, and has been known to practice cannibalism. Animals known to routinely feed on glacial squid include the Antarctic petrel, light-mantled albatross, Ross seal, southern elephant seal, Weddell seal, Patagonian toothfish, wandering albatross, grey-headed albatross, the Adélie penguin, and the emperor penguin.

Because of its central position in the food chain P. glacialis has been identified as an indicator species for bioaccumulation in its environment.

== Distribution ==
The squid inhabits the pelagic zone of the southern Ocean. It is found in depths of 300–1,000 m (980–3,280 ft).
