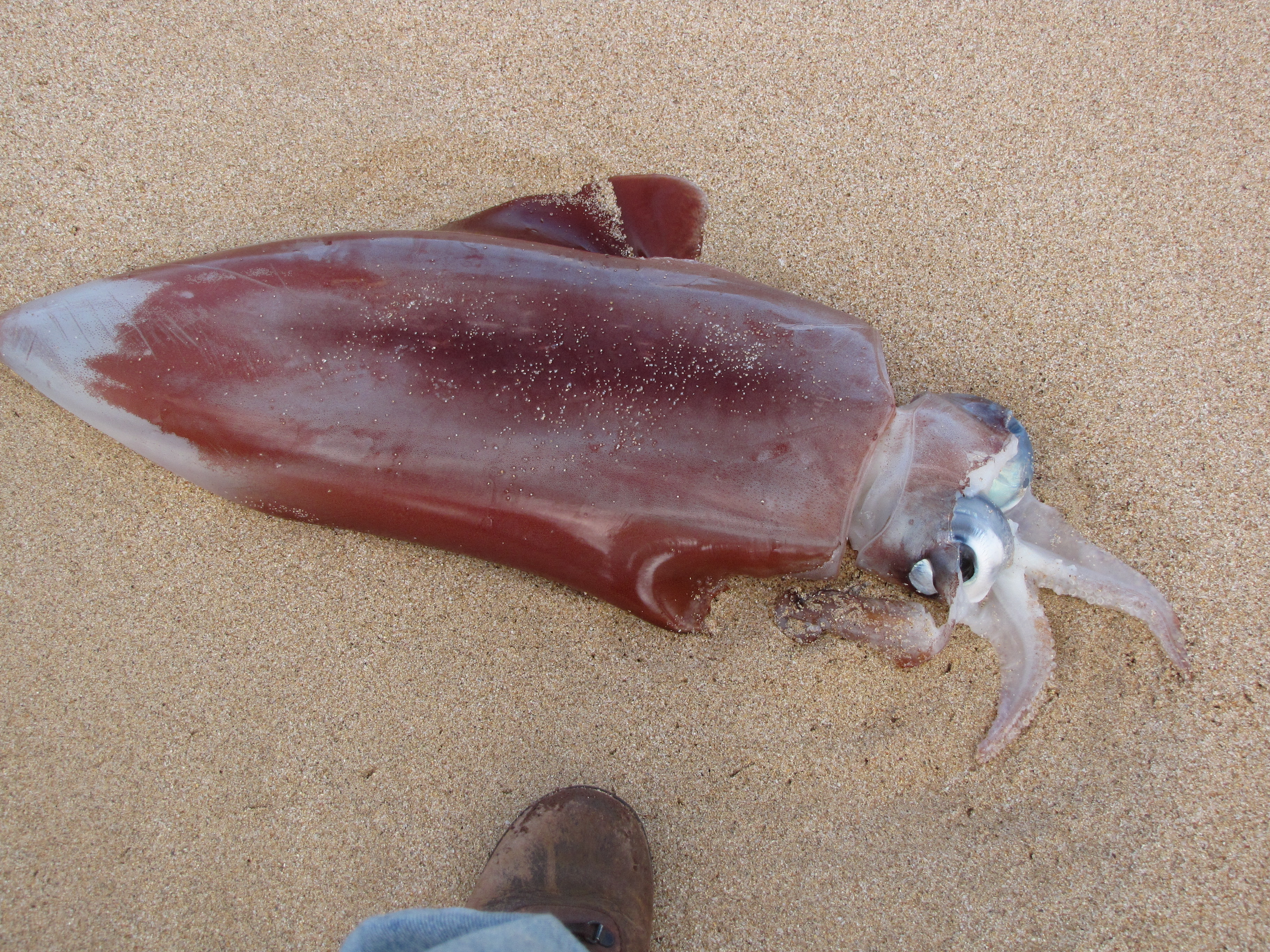
- Thysanoteuthis rhombus

Scientific classification
- Kingdom: Animalia
- Phylum: Mollusca
- Class: Cephalopoda
- Order: Oegopsida
- Superfamily: Cranchioidea
- Family: Thysanoteuthidae; Keferstein, 1866
- Genus: Thysanoteuthis; Troschel, 1857

Type species
- Thysanoteuthis rhombus Troschel, 1857

Synonyms
- Cirrobrachium Hoyle, 1904

= Thysanoteuthis =

Genus of squids

Thysanoteuthis is a genus of large squid, with the type species Thysanoteuthis rhombus being the best known.

The World Register of Marine Species accepts the following species:

- Thysanoteuthis filiferum (Hoyle, 1904)
- Thysanoteuthis major (J. E. Gray, 1828)
- Thysanoteuthis rhombus Troschel, 1857
