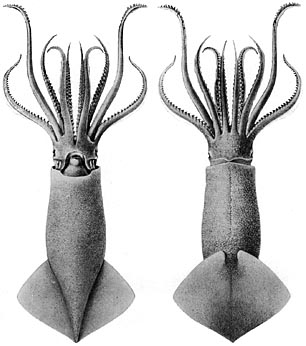
- Moroteuthis ingens

Scientific classification
- Kingdom: Animalia
- Phylum: Mollusca
- Class: Cephalopoda
- Superorder: Decapodiformes
- Order: Oegopsida; Orbigny, 1845

Families
- See text

Synonyms
- Decabranchia; Decapoda Leach, 1817

= Oegopsida =

Oegopsida Temporal range: Cenomanian – recent

Order of squids

Oegopsida is one of the four orders of squid in the superorder Decapodiformes, in the class Cephalopoda. Together with the Myopsina, it was formerly considered to be a suborder of the order Teuthida, in which case it was known as Oegopsina. This reclassification is due to Oegopsina and Myopsina not being demonstrated to form a clade.

The Oegopsida are an often pelagic squid, with some nerito-oceanic species associated with sea mounts. They consist of 24 families and 69 genera. They have these characters in common: the head is without tentacle pockets, eyes lack a corneal covering, arms and tentacle clubs may have hooks, the buccal supports are without suckers, and oviducts in females are paired.

Two families, the Bathyteuthidae and Chtenopterygidae, which have features characteristic of the Myopsida while retaining others common to the Oegopsina, were formerly placed in the family, but are now placed in their own order Bathyteuthida.

The Oegopsida differ from the coastal Myopsida, characterised by the genus Loligo, which have corneal coverings over the eyes and tentacle pockets, but lack hooks, have no suckers on the buccal supports, and a single oviduct.

Oegopsid squid are the only decapods that lack a pocket for the tentacles. Otherwise, they share different characters with different decapod groups. Like the Bathyteuthida and Myopsida, the Oegopsida have a brachial canal, which is absent in other forms. As with the Spirulidae and Idiosepiidae, the Oegopsida lack suckers on the buccal supports, and like the Bathyteuthida, Idiosepiidae, and Spirulidae, they have no circular muscle on the suckers.

== Evolution ==
The earliest fossils of Oegopsida are jaw fragments from the Late Cretaceous. Prior to 2025, the earliest of these were known from the Santonian or early Campanian of the Yezo Group in Hokkaido, Japan. These jaw fragments are extremely large, suggesting that oegopsids could already evolve very large body sizes early on. One of these fossils was described as the genus Yezoteuthis, which has been estimated to rival the modern giant squid in size. Another jaw fragment described in 2023 was found to be twice as long as a giant squid's jaws.

In 2025, numerous other fossil beaks, comprising many newly-described genera and families, were identified from the Yezo Group, dating back to at least the earliest Cenomanian. This confirms that oegopsids were already a dominant component of Cretaceous seas and had diverged from the myopsids by this time. However, Yezoteuthis, the earliest described fossil oegopsid, was found to be a squid of uncertain affinities.

== Taxonomy ==
Fernández-Álvarez et al., 2021 proposed a classification scheme of Oegopsids using superfamilies, which has been accepted by WoRMS. Their schema is elaborated below:

=== Architeuthoidea ===
Superfamily defined by the possession of buccal connectives which attach to the dorsal margins of ventral arms; without photophores; funnel–mantle locking apparatus straight, reaching the anterior mantle margin; fins without anterior lobes, with anterior fin attachment to mantle rather than gladius; tentacles with numerous carpal suckers; and characters of the mitochondrial gene. It encompasses the families Architeuthidae and Neoteuthidae.

=== Cranchioidea ===
Superfamily defined by modifications of the funnel–mantle locking apparatus; funnel–mantle locking apparatus reaching the anterior margin of the mantle; with two series of suckers in the arms; tentacle manus suckers usually in four series; and characters of the mitochondrial gene. It encompasses the families Cranchiidae, Ommastrephidae, and Thysanoteuthidae,

=== Chiroteuthoidea ===
Superfamily defined by having ammoniacal and weakly muscled bodies; the possession of a secondary adult tentacular club but with primary tentacle club in early stages, with protective membranes on clubs symmetrical or subsymmetrical, without carpal locking apparatus, without keel, without terminal pad; buccal connectives attaching ventrally to ventral arms; funnel–mantle locking apparatus usually oval, although sometimes modified by projections (tragus and/or antitragus), reaching the anterior margin of the mantle; fins usually terminal; may have a long tail supported by the secondary conus of the gladius during some stages of development. It encompasses the families Batoteuthidae, Chiroteuthidae, Joubiniteuthidae, Magnapinnidae, Mastigoteuthidae, and Promachoteuthidae.

=== Cycloteuthoidea ===
Superfamily defined by the buccal connectives attaching to the ventral borders of ventral arms; with two series of arm suckers; tentacles with carpal locking apparatus and a broad dorsal keel; manus suckers usually with a large stalk, with three or four series of suckers on the dactylus; terminal pad with dispersed suckers at the end of the tentacle club; gladius with a secondary conus or without a conus. It encompasses the families Brachioteuthidae and Cycloteuthidae.

=== Enoploteuthoidea ===
Superfamily defined by possessing eight or the remnants of eight buccal supports, the ventral supports attached to the dorsal margins of ventral arms; with photophores; two series of arms suckers usually with hooks; four series of tentacle suckers in young stages, sometimes reduced in adults; spermatangia usually attached to specialized tissue in the nuchal region. It encompasses the families Ancistrocheiridae, Enoploteuthidae, Lampadioteuthidae, Lycoteuthidae, and Pyroteuthidae.

=== Pholidoteuthoidea ===
This superfamily is monotypic, containing only Pholidoteuthidae, with two species of Pholidoteuthis. These squid are relatively large, with buccal connectives attached to the ventral borders of ventral arms; two series of arm suckers; tentacles with long tentacle clubs, carpal locking apparatuses poorly developed or absent; small flaps with short membranes present near the base of lateral tentacle suckers; club suckers transversally compressed, dactylus poorly defined, with terminal pad; dermal cushions or papillose tubercules present in skin; funnel–mantle locking apparatus straight, reaching the anterior margin of the mantle; without photophores; with primary or secondary conus; digestive gland far posterior to the nuchal cartilage; without hectocotylization.

=== Octopoteuthoidea ===
Superfamily defined by weakly or strongly muscled ammoniacal bodies with buccal connectives attached to the ventral borders of ventral arms; with two series of arm suckers, some or all of which may be modified into hooks; adults without tentacles; the funnel–mantle locking apparatus straight, reaching the anterior margin of the mantle in some species; with secondary conus in the gladius; paralarval tentacle club characteristic, with small compact clubs with a few small and large suckers arranged in two series; and a characteristic mitogenome lacking the oegopsid duplicated genes. It encompasses the families Lepidoteuthidae and Octopoteuthidae.

=== incertae sedis ===
The families Gonatidae, Histioteuthidae, Onychoteuthidae, and Psychroteuthidae have an indeterminate position within the order (incertae sedis) due to weak support for their position relative to the other oegopsid families. Other taxa considered to be part of this order but considered incertae sedis are Parateuthis, †Haboroteuthidae, Mobydickidae, †Pachypteroteuthidae, †Paleothysanoteuthidae, and †Scuthoteuthidae.

=== Phylogeny ===
The following cladogram is based on a maximum likelihood phylogenetic tree from a 2021 study analyzing the mitogenomes and nuclear markers of Oegopsida:

- Oegopsida
  - Cranchioidea
    ⊞
    ⊟
    - - Ommastrephidae
        - - Todaropsis eblanae
          - Illex coindetii
        - - - Dosidicus gigas
            - Sthenoteuthis pteropus
          - - Todarodes filippovae
            - Todarodes sagittatus
      - Thysanoteuthidae
        Thysanoteuthis rhombus
    - Cranchiidae
      - Leachia cf. atlantica
      - - - - Teuthowenia pellucida
            - Bathothauma lyromma
          - - Helicocranchia sp.
            - Taonius pavo
        - - Megalocranchia cf. oceanica
          - Egea inermis
  - - - - - - Enoploteuthoidea
              ⊞
              ⊟
              - - Enoploteuthidae
                  Abralia veranyi
                - Ancistrocheiridae
                  Ancistrocheirus sp.
              - - - Lycoteuthidae
                    Selenoteuthis scintillans
                  - Pyroteuthidae
                    Pyroteuthis margaritifera
                - Lycoteuthidae
                  Lampadioteuthis megaleia
            - - - Chiroteuthoidea
                  ⊞
                  ⊟
                  - Chiroteuthidae
                    - Chiroteuthis veranii
                    - Grimalditeuthis bonplandi
                  - - Mastigoteuthidae
                      Echinoteuthis atlantica
                    - - Magnapinnidae
                        Magnapinna sp.
                      - Joubiniteuthidae
                        Joubiniteuthis portieri
                - Pholidoteuthoidea Pholidoteuthidae
                  Pholidoteuthis massyae
              - Octopoteuthoidea
                ⊞
                ⊟
                - Octopoteuthidae
                  Octopoteuthis sicula
                - Lepidoteuthidae
                  Lepidoteuthis grimaldii
          - Cycloteuthoidea
            ⊞
            ⊟
            - Cycloteuthidae
              - Discoteuthis laciniosa
              - Cycloteuthis sirventi
            - Brachioteuthidae
              Brachioteuthis beanii
        - Architeuthoidea
          ⊞
          ⊟
          - Neoteuthidae
            Neoteuthis thielei
          - Architeuthidae
            Architeuthis dux
      - - Histioteuthidae
          Stigmatoteuthis arcturi
        - Onychoteuthidae
          Ancistroteuthis lichtensteini
    - Gonatidae
      Gonatus fabricii
- Bathyteuthoidea
  - Chtenopteryx canariensis
  - Bathyteuthis inopinata
