= Cephalopod beak =

Body part of cephalopods

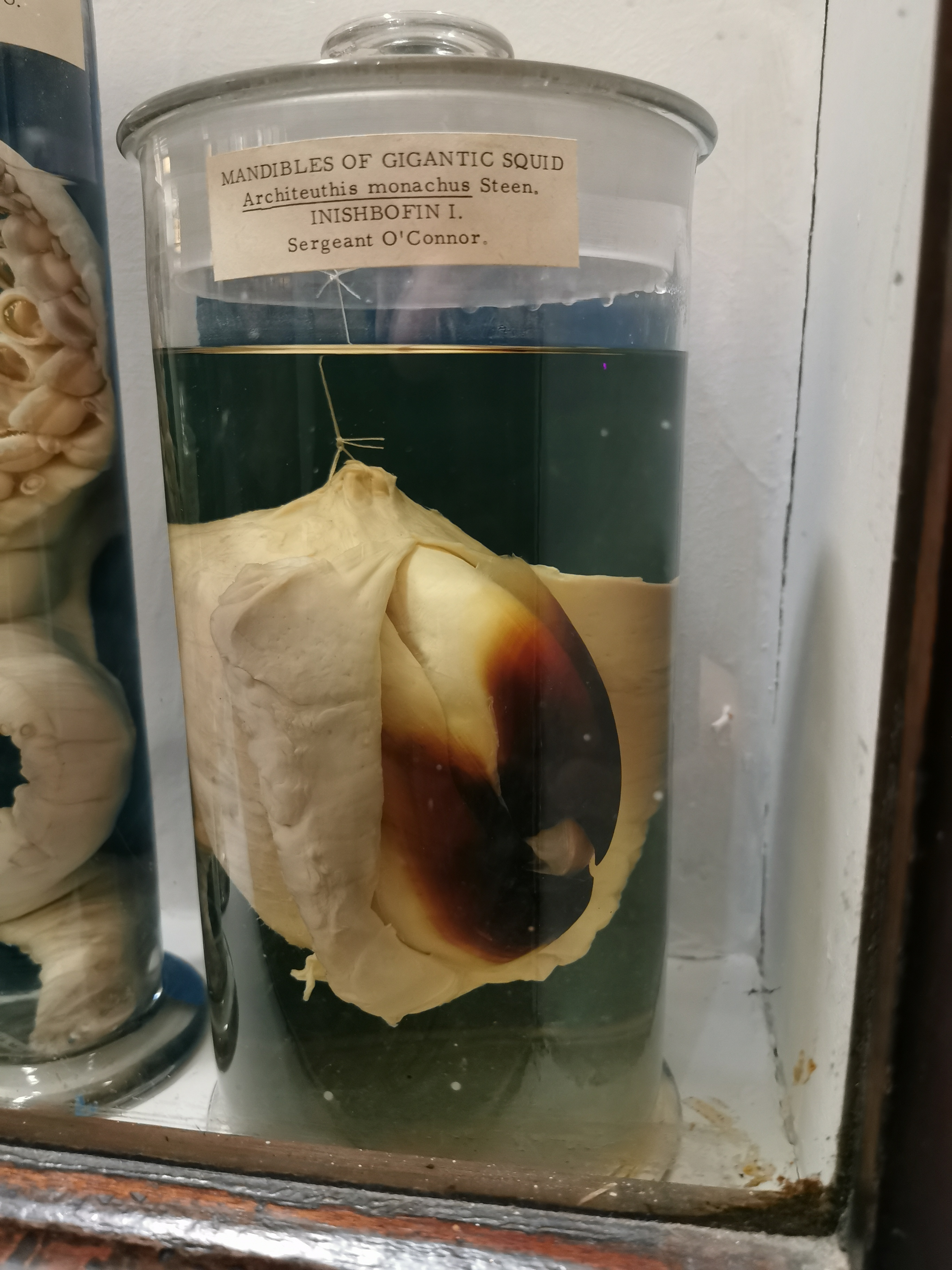
The beak of a giant squid

All extant cephalopods have a two-part beak, or rostrum, situated in the buccal mass (mouthparts) and surrounded by the muscular head appendages. The dorsal (upper) mandible fits into the ventral (lower) mandible and together they function in a scissor-like fashion. The beak may also be referred to as the mandibles or jaws.

Fossilised remains of beaks are known from a number of cephalopod groups, both extant and extinct, including squids, octopuses, belemnites, and vampyromorphs. Aptychi - paired plate-like structures found in ammonites - may also have been jaw elements.

== Composition ==
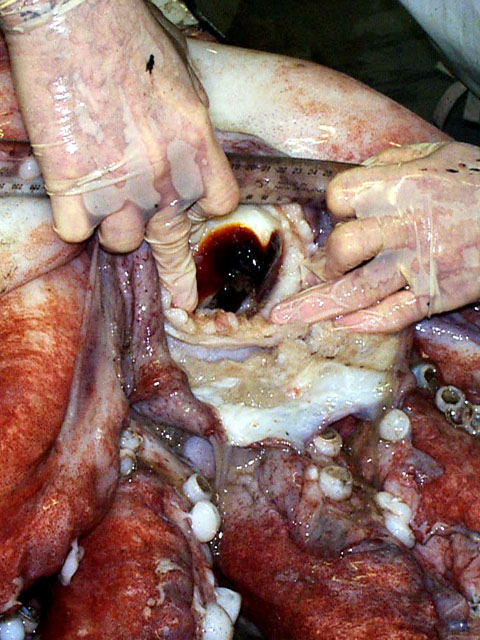
The beak of a giant squid, surrounded by the buccal mass and limbs

Composed primarily of chitin and cross-linked proteins, beaks are more or less indigestible and are often the only identifiable cephalopod remains found in the stomachs of predatory species such as sperm whales. Cephalopod beaks gradually become less stiff as one moves from the tip to the base, a gradient that results from differing chemical composition. In hydrated beaks of the Humboldt squid (Dosidicus gigas) this stiffness gradient spans two orders of magnitude.

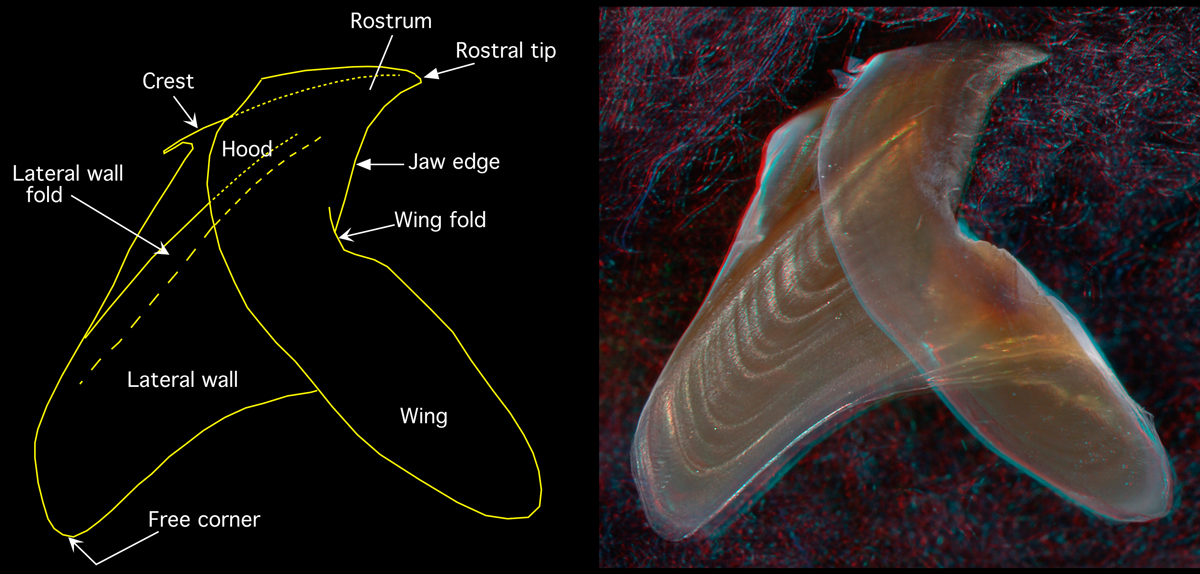
Side view of the lower beak of Chiroteuthis picteti (3.6 mm LRL, 160 mm ML (estimate))
3D red cyan glasses are recommended to view this image correctly.

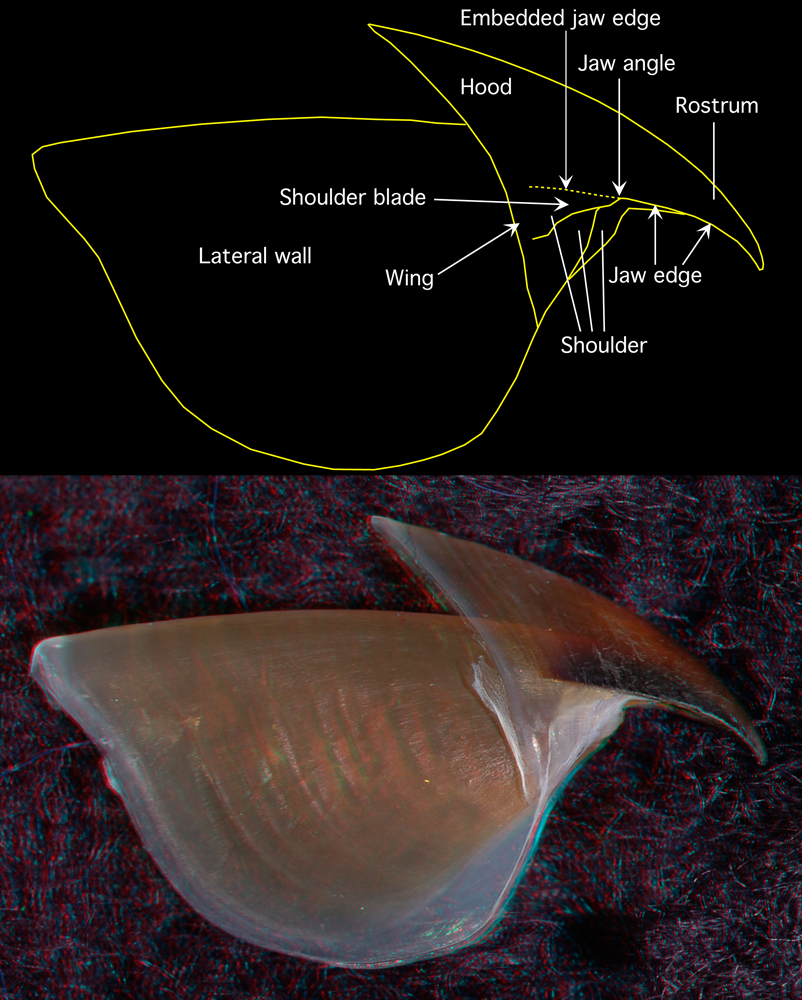
Side view of the upper beak from the same specimen (2.7 mm URL)

== Measurements ==
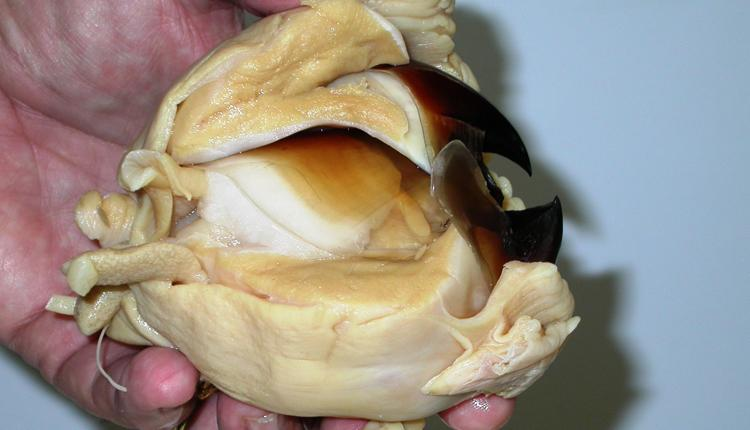
Giant squid beak and associated muscles with hand for scale

The abbreviations LRL and URL are commonly used in teuthology to refer to lower rostral length and upper rostral length, respectively. These are the standard measures of beak-size in Decapodiformes; hood length is preferred for Octopodiformes. They can be used to estimate the mantle length and total body weight of the original animal as well as the total ingested biomass of the species.

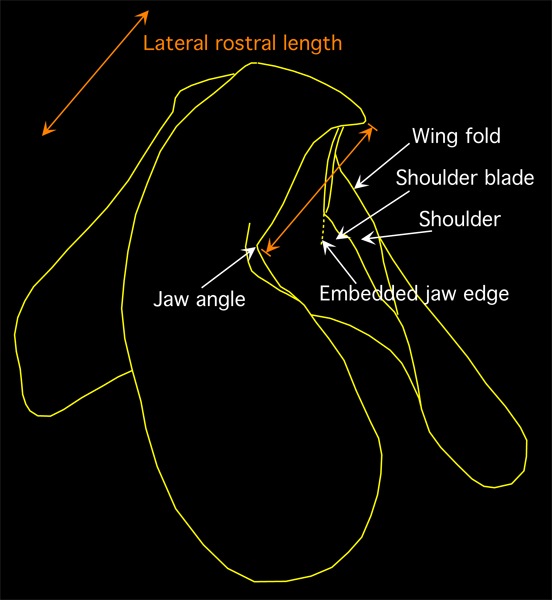
Lower rostral length

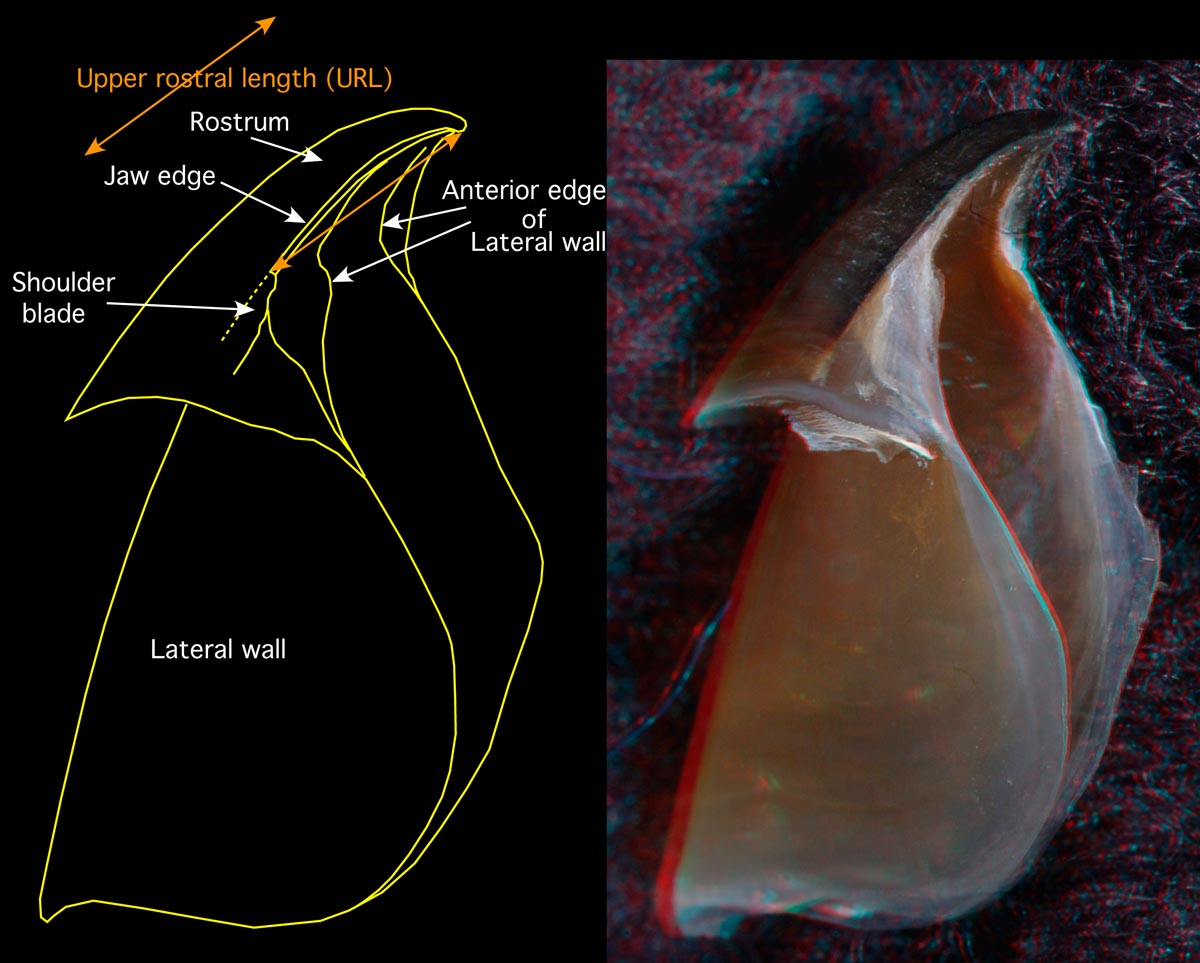
Upper rostral length
