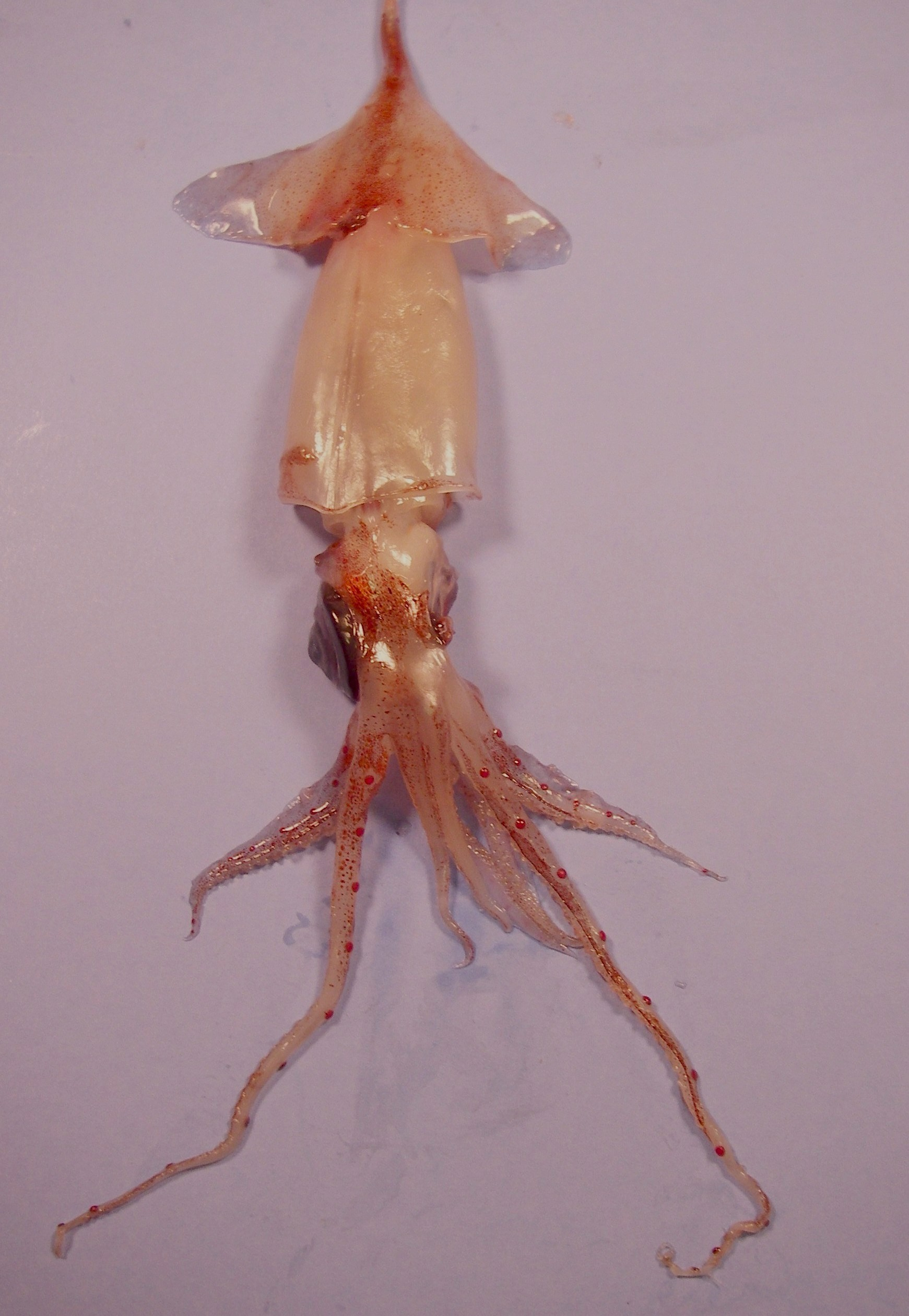

Scientific classification
- Kingdom: Animalia
- Phylum: Mollusca
- Class: Cephalopoda
- Order: Oegopsida
- Family: Lycoteuthidae
- Subfamily: Lycoteuthinae; Pfeffer, 1908

Type genus
- Lycoteuthis Pfeffer, 1900

= Lycoteuthinae =

Subfamily of squids

Lycoteuthinae is a subfamily of squid from the family Lycoteuthidae. They are found in tropical and subtropical waters. They are characterised by the possession of oval photophores on the tentacles, eyeballs and viscera in all species and on the arms, head, mantle and fins in some. Some species also show strong sexual dimorphism. The subfamily contains all of the species classified under Lycoteuthidae, except for Lampadioteuthis megaleia which differs from the Lycoteuthins by the bearing of a hectocotylised arm in males.

== Genera and species ==
The taxa within the subfamily Lycoteuthinae are:

- Lycoteuthis Pfeffer, 1900
  - Lycoteuthis lorigera (Steenstrup, 1875)
  - Lycoteuthis springeri (Voss, 1956)
- Nematolampas Berry, 1913
  - Nematolampas regalis Berry, 1913
  - Nematolampas venezuelensis Arocha, 2003
- Selenoteuthis
  - Selenoteuthis scintillans Voss, 1959
