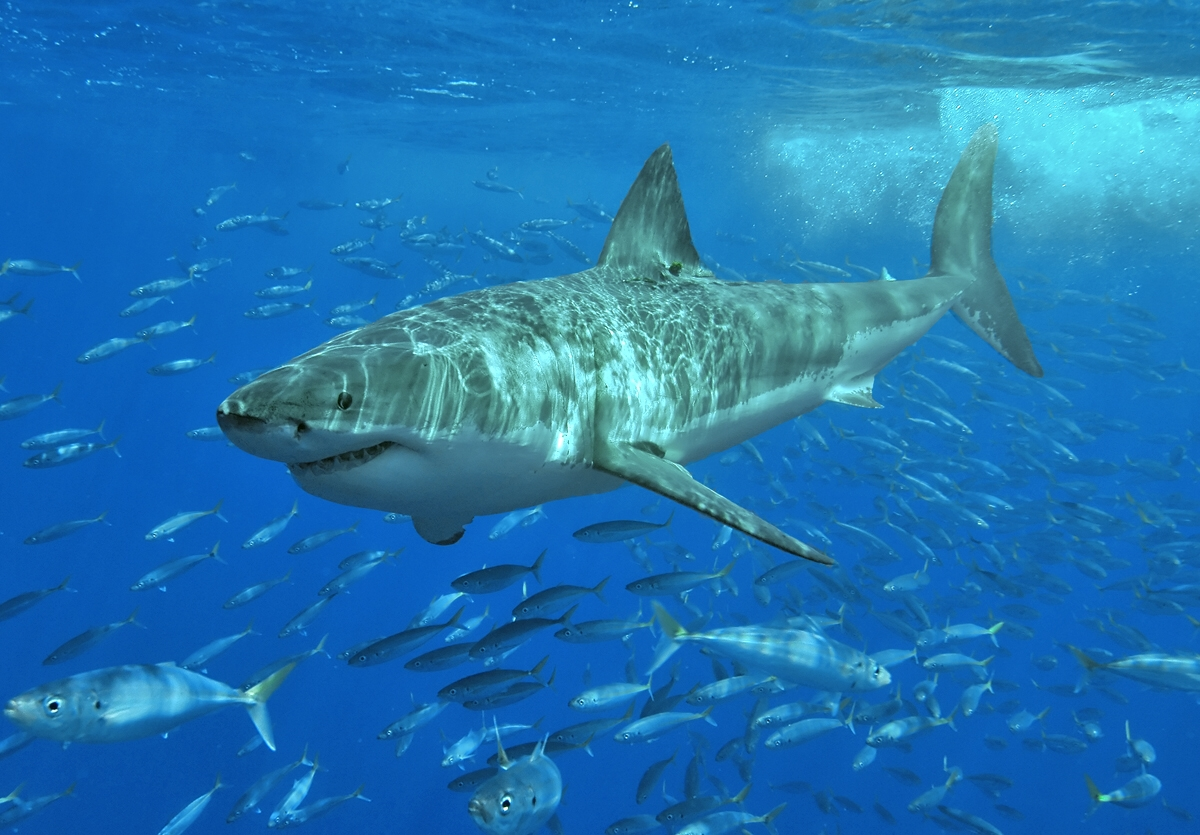
- Male off Isla Guadalupe, Mexico
- Size comparisons with human

Conservation status
- Vulnerable (IUCN 3.1) (Global)

- Critically Endangered (IUCN 3.1) (Europe and the Mediterranean)

Scientific classification
- Kingdom: Animalia
- Phylum: Chordata
- Class: Chondrichthyes
- Subclass: Elasmobranchii
- Division: Selachii
- Order: Lamniformes
- Family: Lamnidae
- Genus: Carcharodon
- Species: C. carcharias

Binomial name
- Carcharodon carcharias (Linnaeus, 1758)
- Range based on the IUCN (2018) Extant (Resident) Possibly extant

Synonyms
- List: Squalus carcharias Linnaeus, 1758; Carcharodon carcharias (Linnaeus, 1758); Squalus caninus Osbeck, 1765; Carcharias lamia Rafinesque, 1810; Carcharias verus Cloquet, 1817; Squalus vulgaris Richardson, 1836; Carcharias vulgaris (Richardson, 1836); Carcharodon smithii Agassiz, 1838; Carcharodon smithi Bonaparte, 1838; Carcharodon rondeletii Müller & Henle, 1839; Carcharodon capensis Smith, 1839; Carcharias atwoodi Storer, 1848; Carcharias maso Morris, 1898; Carcharodon albimors Whitley, 1939

= Great white shark =

Great white shark Temporal range: Early Pliocene – Recent 5–0 Ma

Species of large lamniform shark

The great white shark (Carcharodon carcharias), also known as the white shark, white pointer, or great white, is a large shark. It is closely related to the mako sharks, the porbeagle, and the salmon shark. It is a robustly built species with a grayish upperside and a white underside. The white shark is one of the largest living shark and fish species, though it is still smaller than the whale shark and basking shark. It has about 300 triangular, serrated teeth that are continuously replaced. Its massive, fatty liver can reach over a quarter of its body weight, providing buoyancy and storing energy. The species is partially warm-blooded, an adaptation that allows it to remain active in colder waters.

White sharks inhabit tropical and temperate ocean waters around the world and can be found both near coasts and in the open ocean. Populations are most concentrated at the Pacific and Atlantic of North America and in the waters of southern Africa and Oceania. They are a highly migratory species, traveling between the coast and the open ocean and even between continents. The white shark preys on marine mammals such as seals and dolphins, as well as squid and fish, including other sharks. It also scavenges whale carcasses. Though normally an apex predator, the species is sometimes preyed on by orcas. White sharks are generally solitary, but may gather in aggregations, particularly at feeding sites. They may communicate and establish dominance hierarchies with body language. The species reproduces with pups hatching from eggs inside the female before being born live. Juvenile white sharks typically inhabit shallower water and are limited to feeding on smaller prey.

The white shark has a fearsome reputation among the public. It is featured in the 1974 novel Jaws and its 1975 film adaptation, both of which portray it as a ferocious man-eater. In reality, white sharks normally do not prey on humans, and the majority of bites are due to curiosity or possibly mistaken identity. Many attempts have been made to keep the species in captivity, but specimens either ended up dying or being released. White shark aggregations have attracted tourists who may view them from boats or from inside shark cages.

The International Union for Conservation of Nature lists the white shark as a vulnerable species globally and critically endangered regionally in European and Mediterranean waters. Major threats have included accidental catching by commercial fisheries, recreational fishing, and entanglement in protective nets near beaches. Several governments have enacted protections for the species, including bans on catching and killing it.

== Etymology and naming ==
The most common English names for the species include great white shark, white shark, and the Australian English variant white pointer. These names refer to its white underside, which is noticeable in dead sharks lying upside down. Colloquial use favors the name 'great white shark' or simply 'great white', with 'great' perhaps emphasizing the size and power of the species. Scientists typically use 'white shark' or 'the white shark' as no "lesser white shark" exists for comparison, though some use 'white shark' to refer to all members of the Lamnidae.

The scientific generic name, Carcharodon, combines two Greek words. The prefix carchar- is derived from κάρχαρος (kárkharos), which means "sharp". The suffix -odon derives from ὀδών (odṓn), which translates to "tooth". The specific name carcharias is from the καρχαρίας (karkharías), the Ancient Greek word for shark. The white shark was one of the species originally described by Carl Linnaeus in his 1758 10th edition of Systema Naturae and assigned the scientific name Squalus carcharias, Squalus being the genus in which he placed all sharks. By the 1810s, the shark was recognized as needing to be placed in a new genus, but not until 1838 did Sir Andrew Smith coin the name Carcharodon as the new genus.

A few attempts have been made to describe and classify the white shark before Linnaeus. One of the earliest mentions of it in literature as a distinct type of animal appears in a 1553 book by Pierre Belon. (Note: De aquatilibus duo, cum eiconibus ad vivam ipsorum effigiem quoad ejus fieri potuit, ad amplissimum cardinalem Castilioneum) In it, he illustrated and described the shark under the name Canis carcharias based on the ragged nature of its teeth and its perceived similarities with dogs. (Note: During Belon's time, sharks were called "sea dogs".) Guillaume Rondelet would give it the name Lamia—after the child-eating monster from Greek Mythology—in his 1554 book Libri de Piscibus Marinis. The book identified it as the fish that swallowed the prophet Jonah in biblical texts.

== Taxonomy and evolution ==
- - Sand tiger shark
  - - Basking shark
    - - - Porbeagle
        - Salmon shark
      - - Great white shark
        - - Shortfin mako
          - Longfin mako

Evolutionary relationship between the great white shark and other sharks within the order Lamniformes based on genetic and anatomical data

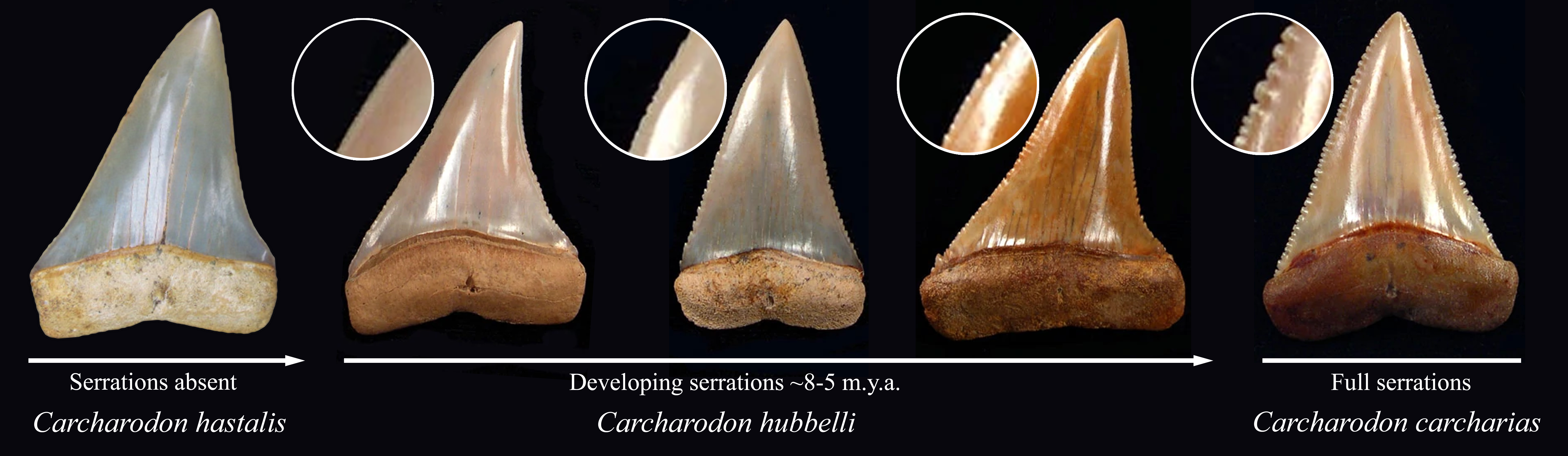
Evolution from C. hastalis to C. carcharias

The white shark is the sole living species in the genus Carcharodon and is one of five living species of the family Lamnidae. The other four members of this family are the mako sharks, porbeagle, and salmon shark. The family belongs to the Lamniformes, the order of mackerel sharks.

The white shark first appears in the fossil record in the Pacific basin around 6–5 mya, between the late Miocene and early Pliocene. Like all sharks, the white shark's skeleton is made primarily of soft cartilage that does not preserve well. As a result, the overwhelming majority of fossils are teeth. Nevertheless, paleontologists have traced the emergence of the white shark and its immediate ancestry to a large extinct shark known as Carcharodon hastalis. This species had teeth similar to the modern white shark's, except for the cutting edges, which lacked serrations. C. hastalis occupied a similar position in the food web to modern white sharks and was probably mostly fish-eating, with some marine mammals in its diet, though its lack of serrations made it a less efficient predator of them.

Around 8–6 mya, a Pacific population of C. hastalis evolved into C. hubbelli. This divergent lineage was characterized by a gradual development of serrations over the next few million years. Teeth from the same time period may exhibit significant variation in shape and their serrations, which may be indicative of persistent interbreeding with C. hastalis for at least some time. White sharks descended from C. hubbelli and dispersed globally by the end of the Pliocene, replacing the much larger shark, megalodon.

=== Populations and genetic history ===
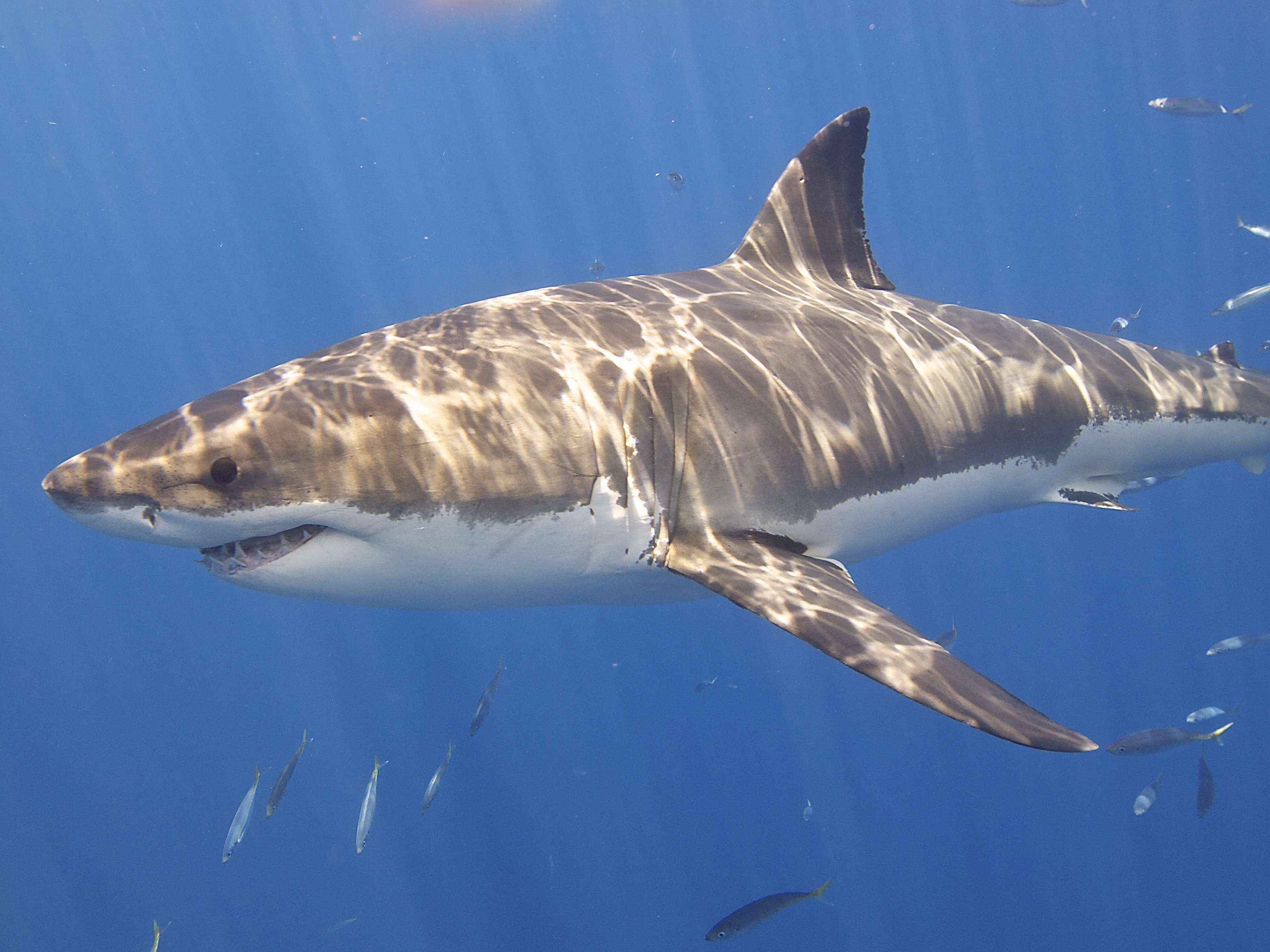
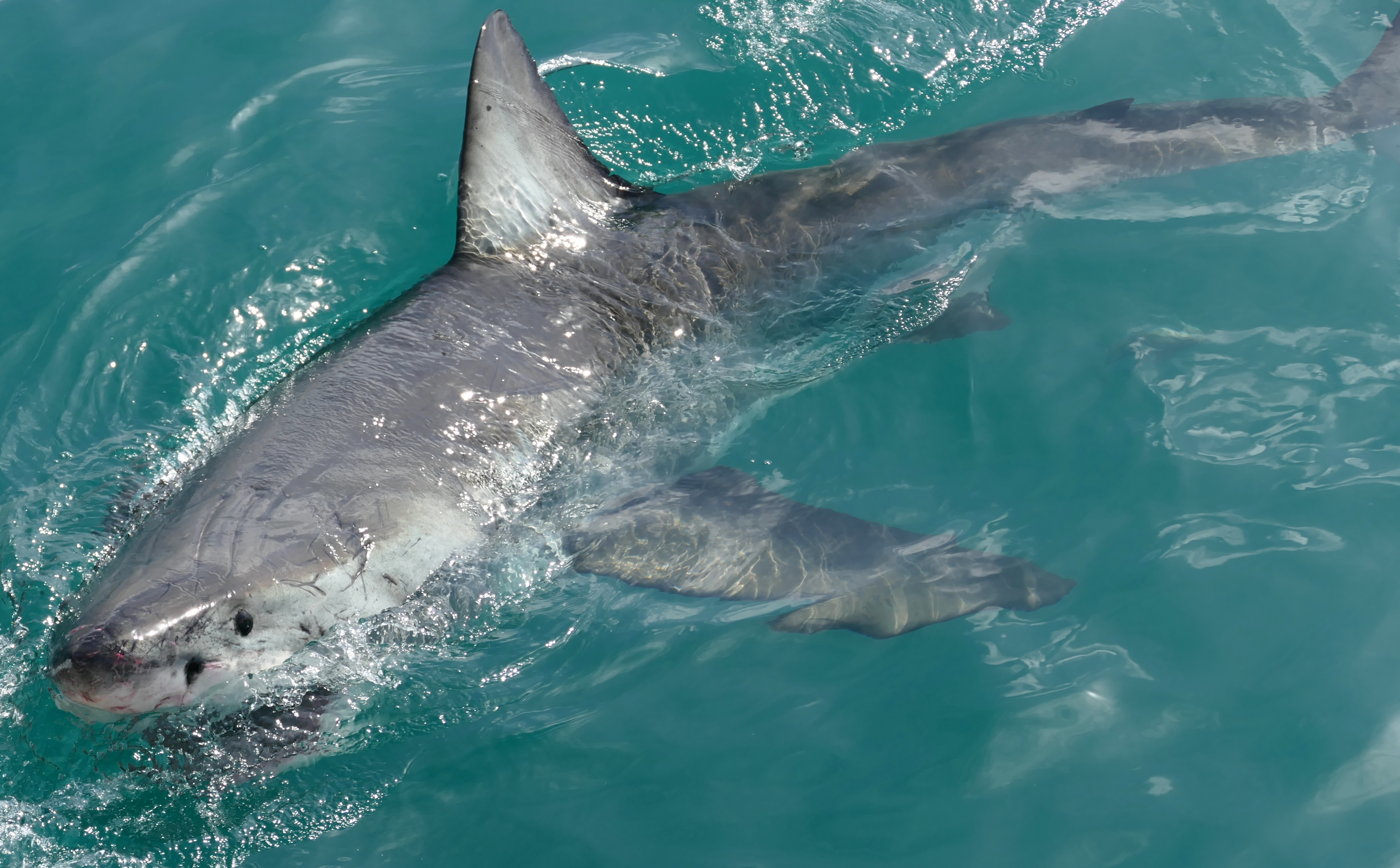
White sharks from Guadalupe Island (left) and South Africa (right). Genetic evidence suggests these two sharks belong to separate divergent lineages.

The white shark's genome has remained relatively stable in its evolution. As a species, it does not behave as a unified metapopulation at the global scale. Instead, populations within the major ocean basins show distinct genetic lineages that diverged from each other at least thousands of years ago. A 2020 mitochondrial DNA (mDNA) (mother-inherited) study concluded that Mediterranean sharks show closer affinity with Australia/New Zealand and Northeastern Pacific sharks than with sharks from South Africa and the Northwestern Atlantic. The researchers suggested that, over 3 mya, sharks from the former region swam to South Africa and north in response to Pleistocene climatic cycles and ended up in the Mediterranean. A 2024 study cautioned that mDNA is "informative about the species' deep history but are of very limited use for estimating recent connectivity". Using nuclear DNA (both mother- and father-inherited), the study concluded that white shark populations can be divided into three major branches or clades: North Atlantic (represented by the US East Coast and Mediterranean), Indo-Pacific (represented by Australia, New Zealand and South Africa), and North Pacific (represented by California, Baja California, and East Asia). These diverged relatively recently, around 100,000–200,000 years ago, in response to lowered sea levels.

A 2025 study affirmed the existence of these three clades but found that they diverged around 7,000 years ago following a decline in the global white shark population, which started 800,000 years ago. Analysis of the Y chromosome (father-inherited) likewise found no clear geographic structure, consistent with recent fragmentation. Datings by the 2024 study coincide with the penultimate glaciation, which may have restricted cross-oceanic movements through sea level fall. Separation probably remains enforced by thermal barriers, namely the cold Benguela upwelling separating South Africa from the Atlantic (which is known to deter white sharks) and the warm equatorial waters separating the North and South Pacific (a known soft barrier for many sharks and rays).

== Appearance and anatomy ==
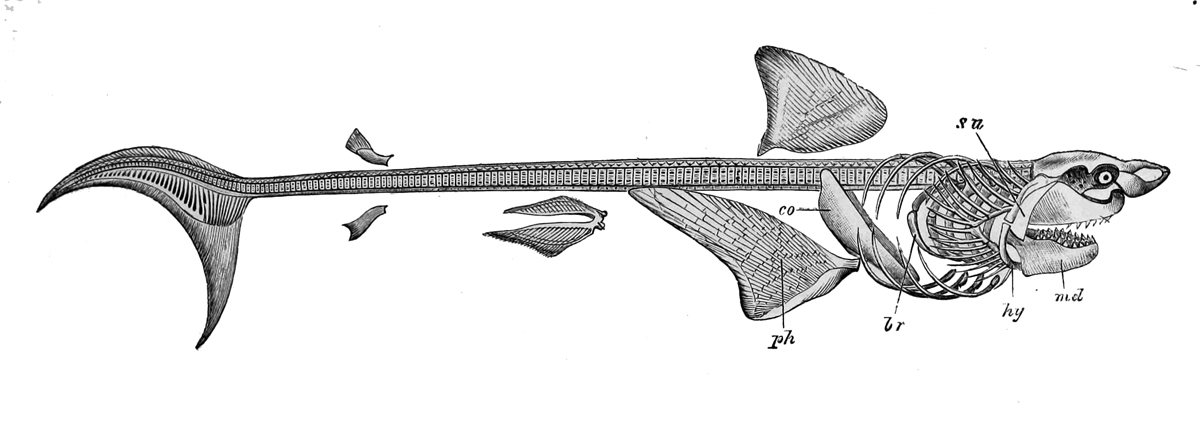
White shark skeleton

The white shark has a stocky, torpedo-shaped body with a short, cone-shaped snout. Its long gill slits do not reach around the head. It has a large triangular first dorsal fin, which partly lines up with the pectoral fins, and a tiny second dorsal fin. The tail fin has two lobes of similar size and a single ridge or keel, and the anal fin is tiny. The white shark has a countershaded coloration for camouflage; being dark on top, usually blue-gray or gray-brown, with a white underside. It also has black tips on the underside of the pectoral fins. There is evidence that the species can change pigments, adding dark pigment or melanin to blotches of white over the course of months. The skin is covered in dermal denticles (tooth-like scales), which are proportionally smaller than in other sharks and have a three-to-five-ridged surface, with each ridge having tips that point backwards.

=== Size ===
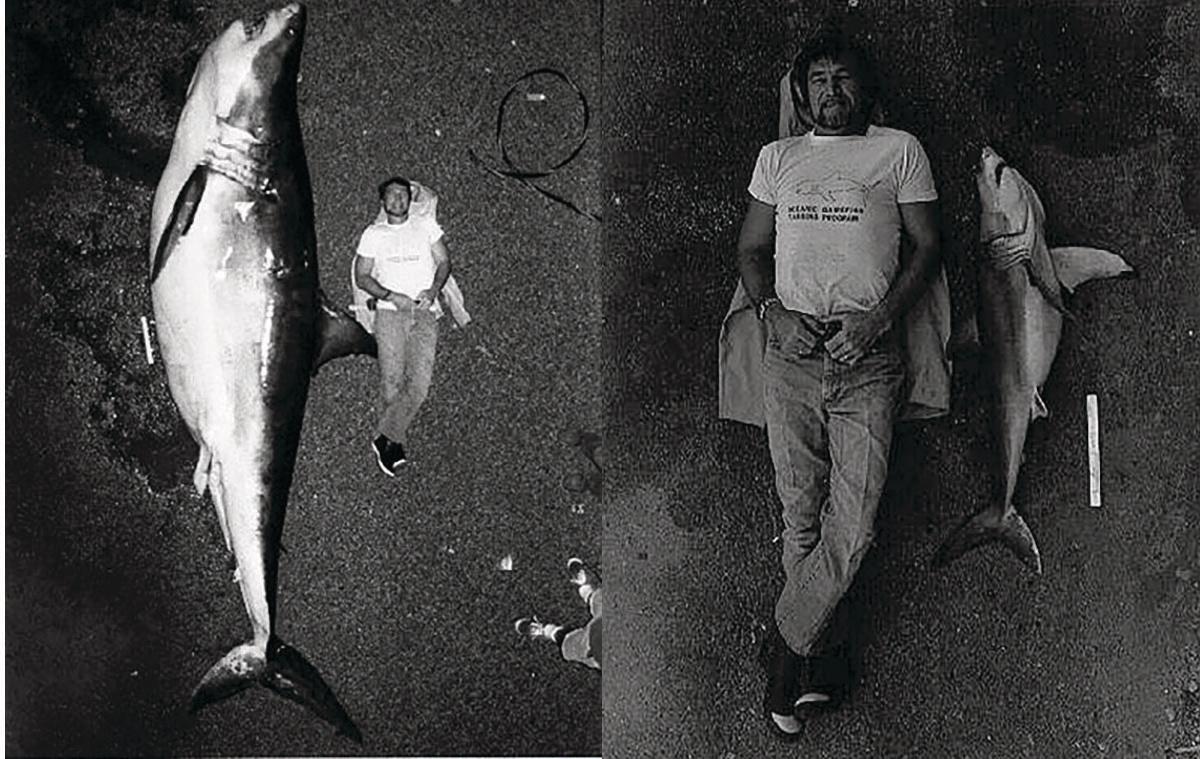
Sizes of two white sharks sampled during a NOAA fisheries survey

The white shark is one of the largest living sharks and fish but is smaller than the whale shark and basking shark. Female white sharks are mature at 4.6–4.9 m (15–16 ft) while males are mature at 3.4–4.0 m (11–13 ft). Females weigh 1,000–1,900 kg (2,200–4,200 lb) while males weigh 680–1,000 kg (1,500–2,200 lb).

The maximum size of the white shark has been debated. Its reputation has led to exaggerated and discredited claims of specimens reaching over 11 m (36 ft) during the 19th and 20th centuries. A 2014 study of catch records in the northwest Pacific found the longest reliably measured shark to be 6.02 m (19.8 ft) and the heaviest to be 2,530 kg (5,580 lb). Prior to this, shark expert John Ernest Randall wrote that the largest white shark reliably measured was a 5.94 m (19.5 ft) specimen reported from Ledge Point, Western Australia, in 1984. Randall argued that the species can likely grow larger than 6 m (20 ft) in length. A female specimen caught in the Mediterranean in 1956 and displayed in Lausanne, Switzerland measured 5.83 m (19.1 ft) long (with upper tail lobe stretched along midline) and had an estimated weight of 2,000 kg (4,410 lb), making it the largest preserved specimen.

=== Teeth and jaws ===
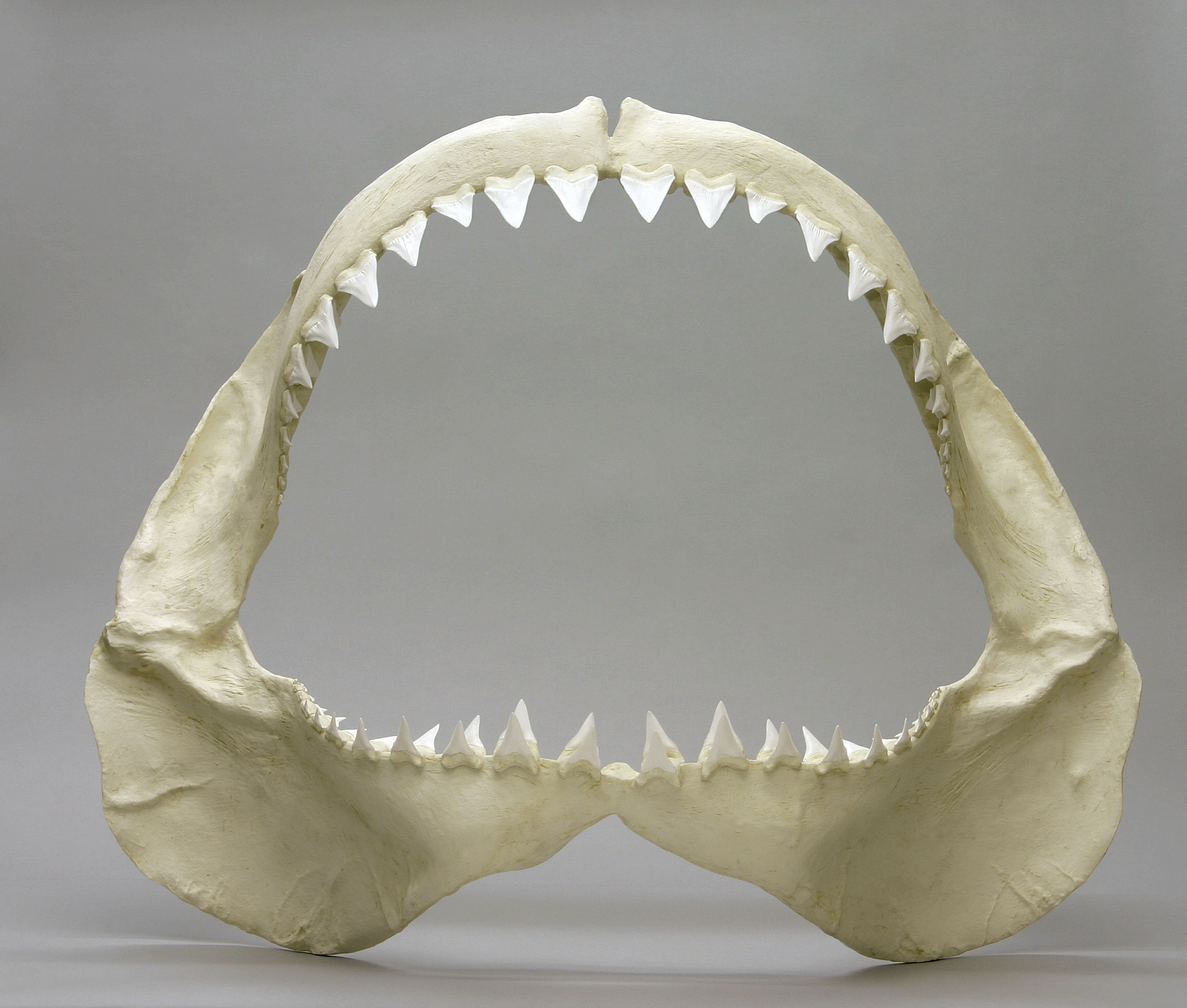
White shark jaws

The triangular teeth can reach 7.5 cm (3.0 in). In juveniles, they are elongated and pointy but become broader and more serrated as they develop into adults. This reflects a shift from a diet mainly of fish to the incorporation of marine mammals. The front teeth are adapted for penetrating prey while the rear teeth, flattened at the sides and bent backwards, are designed for tearing. A total of around 300 teeth are arranged in rows like a conveyor belt, with teeth at the back moving to replace those at the front.

The jaws are separate from the skull and are connected to the body entirely by muscles and tendons, allowing them to extend forward. A 2008 study using a computer scan of a 2.5 m (8.2 ft) long and 240 kg (530 lb) juvenile white shark determined that the specimen could exert a bite force of 1,602 newtons (360 lbf) in the front and 3,131 newtons (704 lbf) in the back. From this, the researchers calculated that a specimen 6.4 m (21 ft) long and weighing 3,324 kg (7,328 lb) could exert a bite force of 9,320 newtons (2,100 lbf) in the front and 18,216 newtons (4,095 lbf) in the back. The jaws are strengthened by mineralized cartilage; this is lacking in young white sharks, which have to eat softer food.

=== Senses ===
As with other sharks, white sharks use five senses when hunting: eyesight, hearing, smell (olfaction), electroreception (via pits called Ampullae of Lorenzini), and water flow detection (via a lateral line). Analysis of the brain and cranial nerves suggests that sight and smell are the most developed. The eyes of the white shark can appear solid black but have blue irises, and the pupil is more horizontal than in other sharks. The eyes have more cones than rods, indicating daytime vision. They lack nictitating membranes (a transparent third eyelid) but possess well-developed muscles that allow them to roll around to keep track of prey and roll back to avoid attacks. The white shark has a relatively large olfactory bulb, an adaptation for detecting scents across the open ocean. A vomeronasal organ, located in the roof of the mouth, also appears to play a role in smell.

=== Internal physiology ===
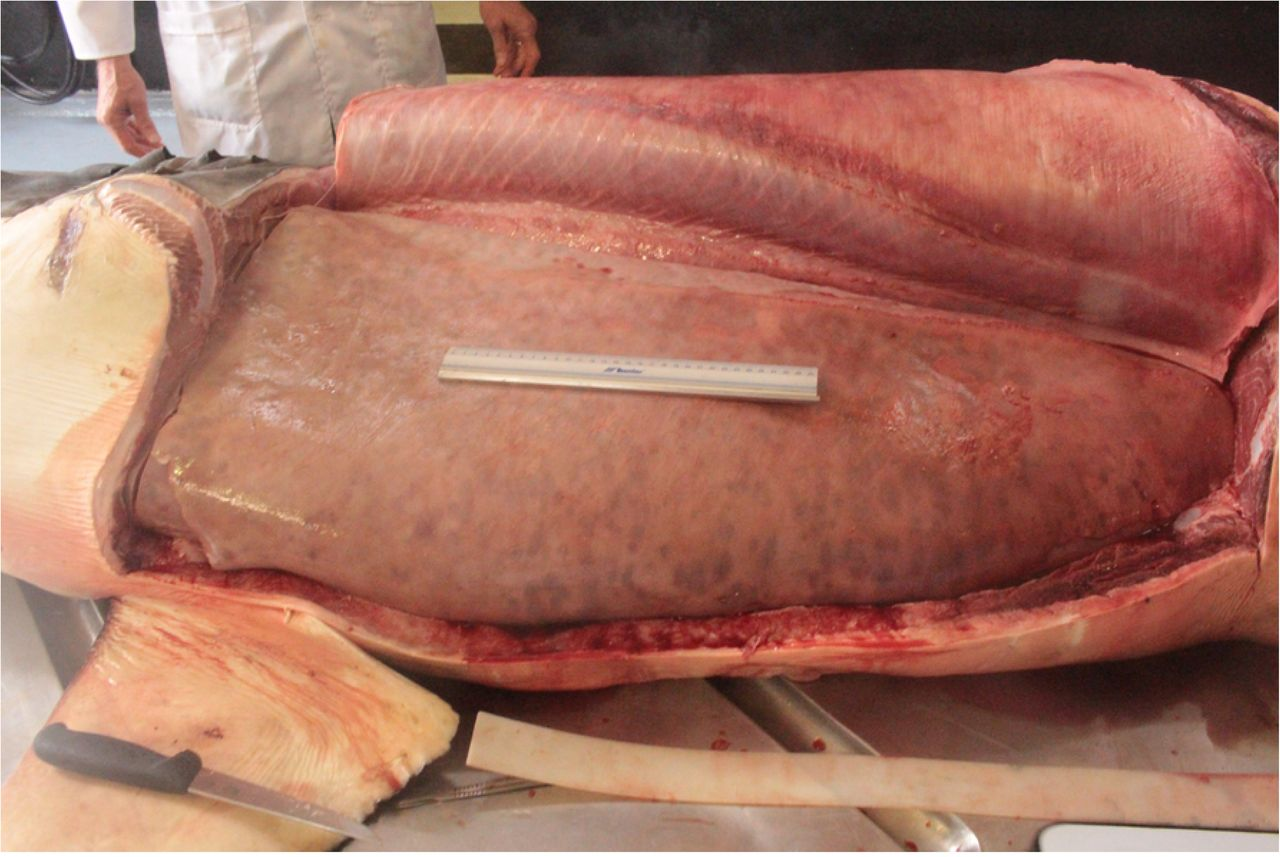
Liver of a white shark

The white shark is an obligate ram ventilator; to breathe, it must swim constantly so water flows through its gills. Over 95% of the shark's musculature is white, fast-twitch muscles, which allows it to move in quick sprints, particularly when ambushing prey. The remaining dark, slow-twitch muscles carry oxygen to power the shark while at cruising speed.

The white shark has a large, double-lobed liver that can be almost 30% of its body weight and stores lipids, fatty acids, and oils. The liver helps keep the shark from sinking, as the oil is six times more buoyant than the surrounding water. The lipids and fatty acids provide the shark with energy for travel and are important for reproduction and growth. One study concluded that a white shark liver is more energy-rich than whale blubber. White sharks appear to have strong immune systems and can tolerate high amounts of toxic heavy metals like mercury and arsenic in their blood, more so than many other vertebrates. They are also documented to heal relatively quickly from even severe wounds, and the species's genome shows "positive selection in key genes involved in the wound-healing process".

White sharks use a system of blood vessels to warm up portions of their body (regional endothermy), which allows them to be active and hunt in cool waters. In this complex blood vessel system, known as a rete mirabile, warm blood generated from the dark muscles is constantly supplied to other parts of the body. Heat is transported between blood vessels flowing in opposite directions (countercurrent exchange) and is retained within the body rather than exiting via the gills. Warm blood can also be redirected from the liver to the body core. In addition, the species has an enlarged, thickened heart, and its blood contains more red blood cells and oxygen-carrying hemoglobin than most mammals and birds. One study found that stomach temperatures ranged from 24.7–26.8 °C (76–80 °F) in waters 12.9–16.1 °C (55–61 °F).

== Distribution and habitat ==
Shark being baited in Guadalupe Island Biosphere Reserve, Mexico

White sharks range from tropical to temperate and even colder waters around the world with major populations in northwestern and northeastern Pacific, western North Atlantic, the Mediterranean, southern African waters and Oceania. It is also present near the coasts of South America but appears to be uncommon. Shark expert Greg Skomal lists the Farallon Islands, California; Guadalupe Island, Mexico; Cape Cod, Massachusetts; Western Cape, South Africa; Neptune Islands, Australia; and both Stewart Island and the Chatham Islands, New Zealand, as major coastal feeding aggregations. Researchers have also identified an offshore feeding aggregation between western North America and Hawaii dubbed the White Shark Café.

White sharks can be found both along the coast and in the open ocean. They are typically close to the surface but may dive to depths of up to 1,300 m (4,300 ft). Deeper dives are more common in the open ocean. Coastal habitats used include nearshore archipelagos, offshore reefs, banks and shoals, and headlands. A 2018 study indicated that white sharks will congregate in patches of warm water in the open ocean. Juvenile white sharks are more limited to shallow coastal waters with temperatures between 14 and 24 °C (57 and 75 °F). Increased sightings of young sharks in areas where they were not previously common, such as Monterey Bay on the central California coast, suggest climate change may be forcing juveniles closer to the poles.

=== Migrations ===
White sharks go on vast migrations in response to food availability and temperature changes, as well as possibly to mate. One individual that was tagged off the South African coast swam to the southern coast of Australia and back within a year. Another white shark from South Africa was tracked swimming to Australia's northwestern coast and back, a journey of 20,000 km (12,000 mi; 11,000 nmi) in under nine months. In May 2024, a satellite tag was recovered from an Indonesian fisherman, which was determined to have come from a subadult female white shark tagged off the South African coast in May 2012, which swam to and was killed off the Indonesian coast in November 2016. In the northeastern Pacific, white sharks travel between the coastal US and Mexico and the Hawaiian Archipelago; they feed along the coast during fall and winter and farther out to sea during spring and summer. In the western North Atlantic, white sharks congregate between the Gulf of Maine and Cape Hatteras during spring and summer, and shift farther south toward Florida and into the Gulf of Mexico during the fall and winter. In fall, winter, and spring, some sharks disperse widely across the ocean, reaching as far east as the Azores.

== Behavior and ecology ==
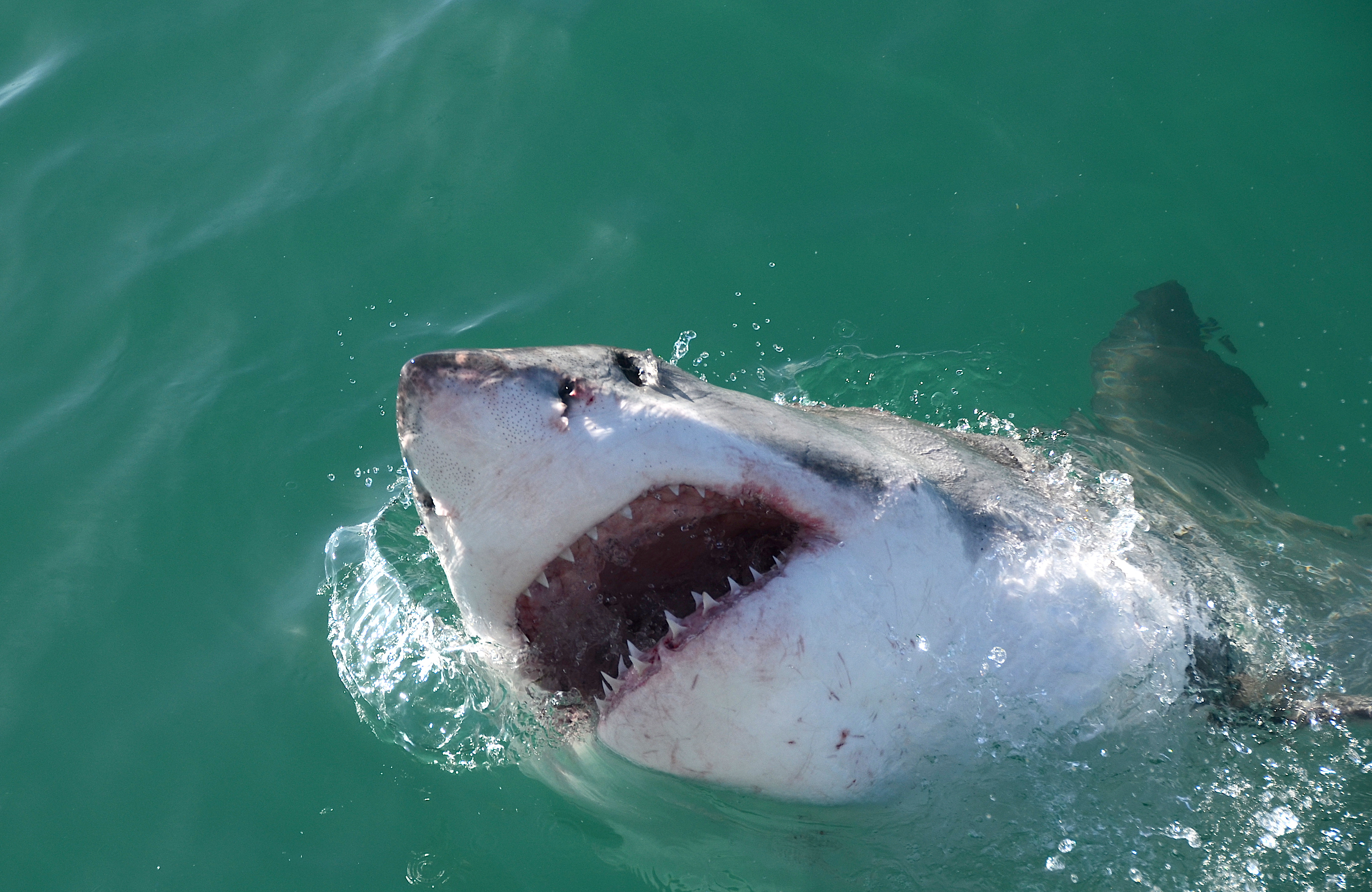
White shark surfacing at Dyer Island

White sharks are estimated to swim 2.88–4.86 km/h (1.79–3.02 mph) but can sprint up to 24.12 km/h (14.99 mph). (Note: There are higher estimates, but these have been described as having a high margin of error.) One individual was recorded cruising at a sustained speed of 4.7 km/h (2.9 mph) while migrating, which is fast for a shark and more similar to fast-swimming tuna. White sharks display various surface behaviors. These include spyhopping (poking head out of the surface) to observe an object above the water, as well as 'repetitive aerial gaping' where a spyhopping shark repeatedly gapes its mouth while belly-up, possibly as a sign of frustration after missing a bait. How they sleep is not well understood. At night, one individual was recorded swimming slowly in one direction along a current with its mouth open.

The white shark is generally considered to be a solitary species, though aggregations do occur. A 2016 study of sharks around Mossel Bay, South Africa, concluded that white shark associations are generally random with few social interactions. By contrast, a 2019 study found that sharks around Neptune Islands gathered in non-random aggregations. Similarly, a 2022 study of white sharks at Guadalupe Island suggested that individuals may associate so that they can learn from others where to find prey or carcasses to scavenge. White shark aggregations can consist of individuals of a specific age and sex. At Neptune Islands, sightings of subadult females peak during April and May, subadult males in February and again in September, adult females in June, and adult males in September.

=== Diet and feeding ===
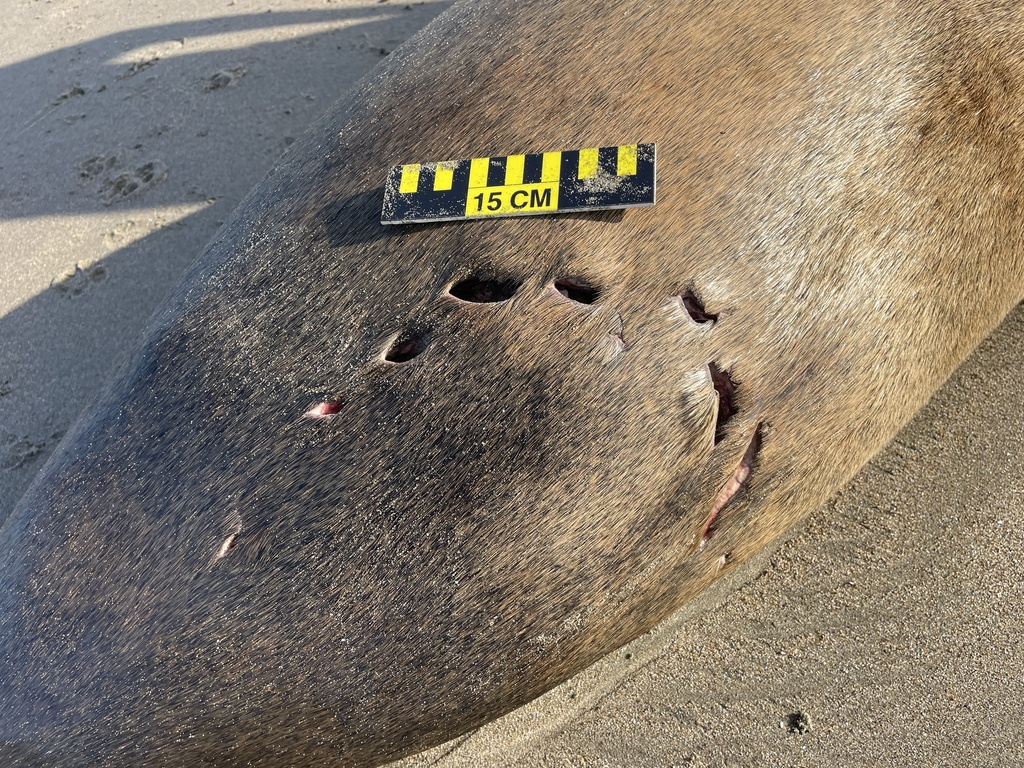
White shark bite mark on a California sea lion

The white shark is an apex predator that opportunistically feeds on fish, cephalopods (like squid), marine mammals, sea birds, and sea turtles. Diet differs based on size and age; individuals over 3 m (10 ft) can feed on marine mammals, while juveniles are limited to smaller prey like fish and cephalopods. White sharks prefer prey with high fat content, but even large individuals are recorded to eat low-fat foods. Marine mammals preyed on include seals and cetaceans (like dolphins). White sharks are also recorded to bite sea otters but do not usually consume them. The seasonal availability of seals drives white shark migration to certain locations. Targeted species include gray seals, harbor seals, northern elephant seals, California sea lions, Cape fur seals and New Zealand fur seals. White sharks mainly hunt seals by ambush and normally target newly weaned young, as they have thick blubber but are still small and inexperienced. Adults are more difficult to overpower and can injure the shark with their teeth and claws; bull elephant seals are particularly formidable, being as massive as adult white sharks. Some species will harass the shark to drive it away.

Observations off California show that white sharks typically ambush seals from below, seizing them near the surface and dragging them under. The strike location often depends on the prey's anatomy: earless seals (like elephant seals) are usually struck near the head or hind flippers, while eared seals (like sea lions) are grabbed behind the torso. With their large fore-flippers, eared seals are usually able to prevent the first bite from being secure, but are still weakened and vulnerable to being recaptured. Prey is released after it dies of blood loss, and the shark feeds on the carcass after it floats to the surface. In 1984, Timothy Tricas and John McCosker suggested that white sharks bite seals, release them, and then wait for them to bleed to death before eating based on observations at Dangerous Reef, South Australia. Others have found no evidence for this hypothesis, but the strategy is possibly employed on bull elephant seals. Off South Africa, ambushes on Cape fur seals usually involve the shark leaping or breaching out of the water. To breach, a shark starts at around 20 m (66 ft) below the surface and ascends quickly towards its target while tilting its body vertically. Sharks may breach partially or entirely out of the water at different angles, clearing up to around 3 m (10 ft) when airborne. Missed seals may be chased after; such pursuits involve the prey using its speed and agility to escape as the shark employs various maneuvers to catch them. The longer the chase, the less likely the shark is to succeed. Sharks commonly consume fur seals quickly after they are killed. White sharks in Cape Cod hunt seals in shallow water, relying on the murkiness of the water for concealment and striking them from the sides.

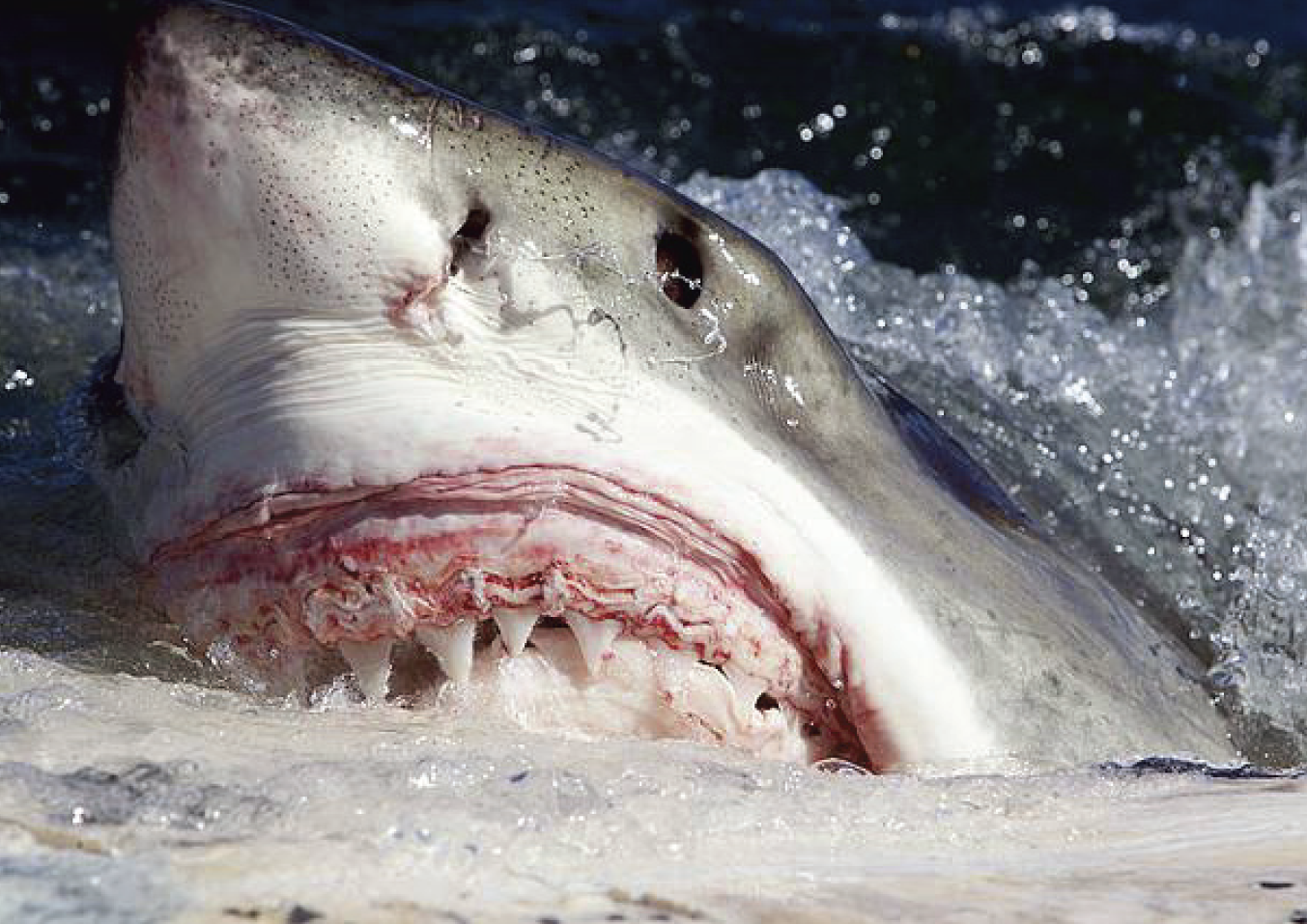
A shark scavenging on a whale carcass in False Bay, South Africa

Cetacean species recorded as prey include small toothed whales like bottlenose dolphins, common dolphins, Indo-Pacific humpback dolphins, striped dolphins, Risso's dolphins, and harbor porpoises. Bite wounds from white sharks have also been documented on species as large as beaked whales. White sharks typically attack toothed whales from behind—beyond the prey's echolocation—and target the tail, underside, or dorsal area. There are two records of white sharks managing to kill small humpback whales which were weakened by net entanglement. One case involved two sharks employing strategic bites while in the other a single shark managed to drown its victim. White sharks are more likely to scavenge large whales than hunt them. When a carcass is available, multiple sharks will gorge themselves, ripping off chunks by shaking their heads side-to-side. They may spit out pieces, possibly judging them to be too low in energy, using their teeth to detect pressure and assess the fat content. The sharks do not appear to act aggressively towards each other, but accidental bites can occur. They eventually become lethargic from overconsumption; they can no longer lift their heads out of the water, nor can they get in a good bite as they bump into the dead whale.

White sharks feed on numerous fish species, including other sharks. One 2023 study found that juvenile and subadult white sharks off the east coast of Australia fed primarily on ray-finned fishes, particularly flathead grey mullets, Japanese scads, and various species of porgies, mackerels, and tuna. Off California, white sharks will eat cabezons, white seabasses, lingcod, halibut, leopard sharks, smooth-hounds, spiny dogfishes, school sharks, stingrays, bat rays, and skates. In the Mediterranean, they consume Atlantic bluefin tunas, bullet tunas, Atlantic bonitos, swordfishes, blue sharks, shortfin makos, and stingrays. An ocean sunfish was also recorded in a white shark's stomach. Off the northeastern US, juveniles commonly eat bottom-dwelling fish like hake, while off South Africa, they often prey on dusky sharks. The remains of an adult whale shark were found in a white shark, though whether this was active hunting or scavenging could not be determined.

They are also recorded to consume cephalopods, as evidenced by beaks found in their stomachs. Off South Africa, white sharks under 2.5 m (8.2 ft) were found with remains of coastal and bottom-dwelling species like certain octopus species, as well as species of the genera Sepia and Loligo, while larger sharks seem to prefer more open-ocean species like those of the genera Ancistrocheirus, Octopoteuthis, Lycoteuthis, Ornithoteuthis, Chiroteuthis, and Argonauta. Near Guadalupe, white sharks have been documented with scars that appear to have been caused by neon flying squids, jumbo squids, and giant squids. Both fish and cephalopods may be important food sources at the White Shark Café.

Other animals recorded as prey include sea turtles. The shells of green sea turtles and loggerhead sea turtles have been found in white shark stomachs in the Mediterranean, and bites have been recorded on leatherback sea turtles off central California. Around Seal Island, South Africa, white sharks are recorded to attack and kill seabirds like Cape cormorants, white-breasted cormorants, kelp gulls, Cape gannets, brown skuas, sooty shearwaters, and African penguins but rarely consume them.

=== Social communication ===
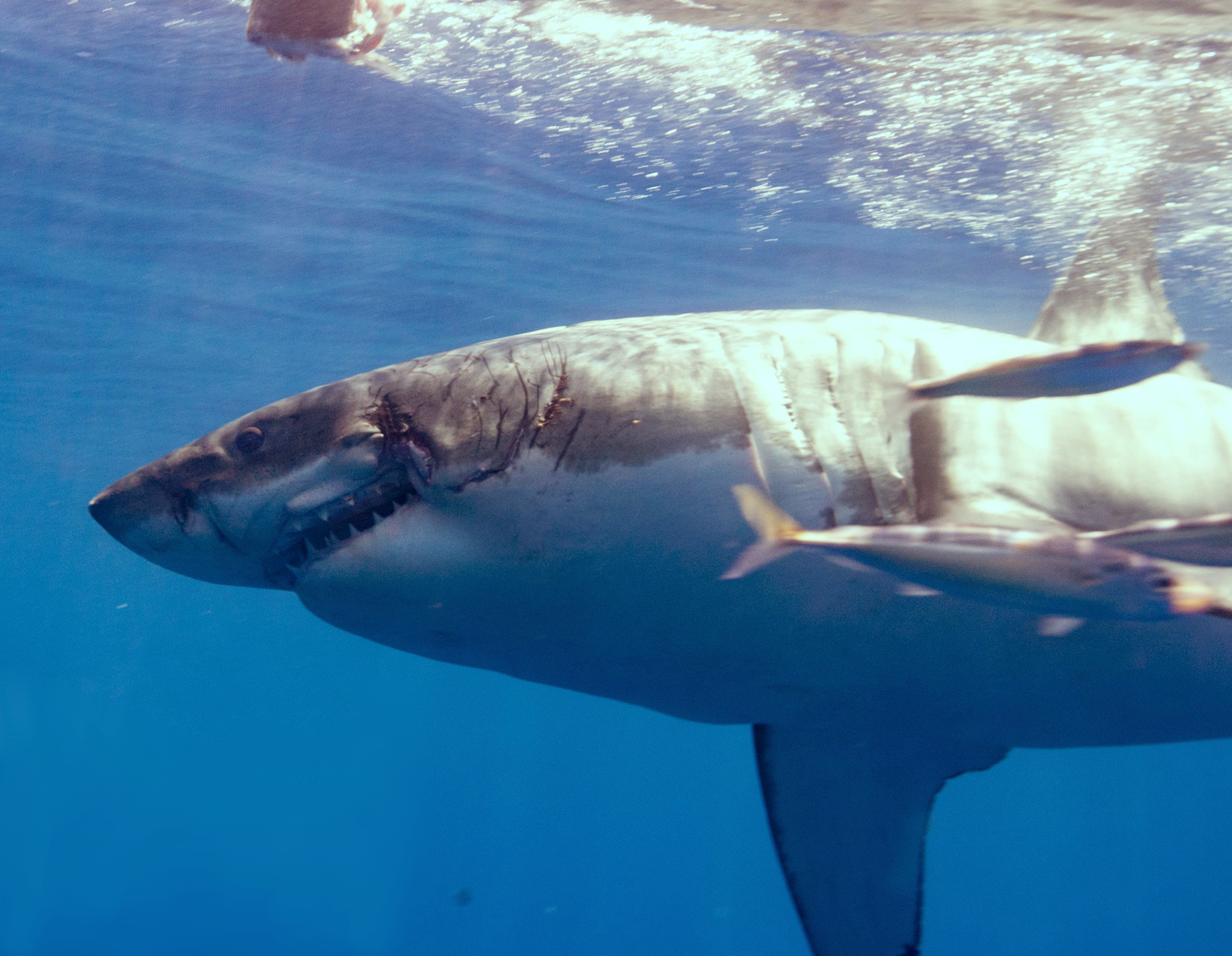
White shark at Guadalupe with wounds caused by another shark

White sharks communicate with each other through a complex array of body language. Most behaviors have been observed at aggregations around seal rookeries shortly after peak hunting periods, where sharks engage in extensive socializing. At least 20 unique forms of body language are known, most of which consist of two sharks swimming in passing, parallel, or circular patterns to ritualistically examine one another.

Occasionally, one shark will openly show off its body in a lateral display to the other. It is hypothesized that the main purpose of these interactions is to establish social rank by size to avoid competition. Observations by Sperone and colleagues in 2010 found display behaviors to be more common between individuals of similar size where differences are not immediately obvious. There is no evidence that sex is a significant factor in behavioral patterns. With dominance established, the smaller shark then acts submissively towards the larger shark by yielding during subsequent encounters or simply avoiding confrontation. Body language is less frequent in California and Australia compared to Dyer Island in South Africa. It is thought that this is because the former locations are less densely populated, and so sharks there are more familiar with each other's hierarchy.

Direct violence is extremely rare, as individuals typically end conflicts through peaceful means. Splash fights appear to be the most common way of resolving ownership disputes over prey. Here, one shark slaps the surface with its tail to splash water at the competing shark. The competitor either withdraws or responds with a tail splash of its own. Usually, one or two splashes are exchanged per shark, though individuals will sometimes persist with more. The contest is "won" by the shark that compels the other to concede via the most tenacious splashing, which appears to signal strength and vigor. Larger body size does not always secure superior signal strength; on occasion, the smaller shark emerges victorious. White sharks have also been observed employing tail splashing to intimidate tiger sharks around a whale carcass and even against boats and shark cages, which were likely perceived as competitors.

=== Reproduction and growth ===
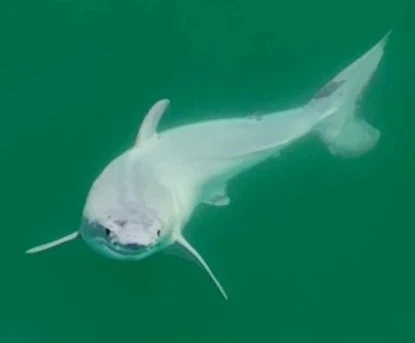
Newborn white shark near Carpinteria

Little is known of the reproductive behavior of the white shark. There are two anecdotal accounts of the species possibly mating, one in 1991 and another in 1997, both off New Zealand. These testimonies both report belly-to-belly rolling during copulation. Researchers assume that the male bites onto the female's head or fin while inserting one of his claspers (sex organs), as is the case in other shark species. The accounts also suggest that white sharks mate in shallow water away from feeding areas. Females at Guadalupe and Cape Cod have been seen with scarring that may have been the result of copulation, possible evidence that these areas are used for mating. Conversely, other studies have concluded that white sharks may mate offshore; males off western North America were found to gather in the open ocean during spring and were followed by some females, suggesting a lek mating system where females move through and choose their partners. In 2013, it was proposed that whale carcasses are an important location for sexually mature sharks to meet for mating, especially with the frenzied excitement.

Captures of pregnant females have provided key insights into the species's reproduction. The white shark is ovoviviparous; fertilized eggs hatch within the female, and the embryos continue to develop within each uterus. Their nourishment comes in three stages: they first feed on their yolk sacs, then a milky substance secreted by the uterus known as lipid histotrophy, and finally switch to consuming unfertilized eggs. After around 12 months, the female gives live birth to two to ten pups. It takes at least two more years until she gives birth again. White sharks generally give birth during spring and summer in shallow waters surrounding islands with temperatures between 15.7 and 23.1 °C (60 and 74 °F). White sharks are born at a length of 1–1.6 m (3–5 ft). In July 2023, a possible newborn white shark was filmed for the first time, off the coast of southern California (just off Carpinteria), measuring an estimated 1.5 m (5 ft) and with a pale complexion attributed to histotrophy. A follow-up study confirmed the Carpinteria shark was a newborn but suggests that the paleness is embryonic epithelium covering the shark's skin denticles. This is known to exist in the related salmon shark and rubs off shortly after birth.

Bands in the shark's vertebrae are used to determine the animal's age and growth. Early studies determined that the species grows relatively quickly; a 1985 study concluded that white sharks reach maturity nine to ten years of age at a length of 3.7–4.3 m (12–14 ft). Conversely, a 2015 study concluded that white sharks are a slow-growing and long-lived species. Males reach maturity at approximately 26 years and a length of around 3.4 m (11 ft), while females take 33 years to reach maturity at a length of around 4.6–4.9 m (15–16 ft). Their growth rate levels off after the age of 40.

=== Mortality and health ===
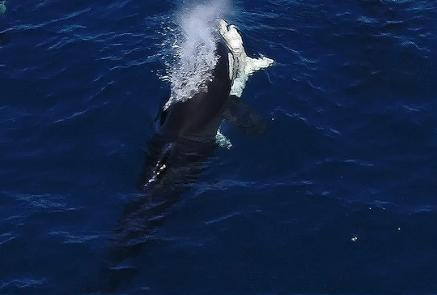
Orca killing a juvenile white shark in the Gulf of California

White sharks are estimated to reach over 70 years of age. A 2018 study of sharks off eastern Australia and New Zealand found that juveniles had an annual survival rate of over 70%, while adults exceeded 90%.

White sharks are sometimes preyed on by orcas, with which they also likely compete for food. The first recorded orca predation occurred at the Farallon Islands in 1997 when an estimated 4.7–5.3 m (15–17 ft) female orca killed an estimated 3–4 m (10–13 ft) white shark. Another similar attack apparently occurred there in 2000, but its outcome is not clear. Orca predation has since been documented on white sharks in other areas. Around South Africa, orcas typically hunt white sharks in groups of two to six. By flipping the sharks belly up, the whales trigger a paralytic state known as tonic immobility, allowing them to precisely target and consume the sharks' energy-rich livers. In 2017, a live white shark was sighted with purported orca teeth marks, providing the first evidence of the species surviving such an attack. White sharks often evacuate an area when orcas arrive, as has been documented both off South Africa and California. However, a 2026 study near Neptune Islands concluded that orcas alone are unlikely to cause white sharks to leave an area long-term. In addition to orcas, white sharks may fall prey to other sharks, including older white sharks, as pups and juveniles.

There are two recorded instances of the parasitic cookiecutter shark targeting white sharks off Guadalupe, though the scarcity of such records suggests white sharks are not a primary food source for them. As many as 116 parasite species infest white sharks, including copepod crustaceans—such as Nesippus orientalis, Nemesis lamna, and Dinemoura latifolia—which attach to the skin, fins, mouth, and gills. The white shark is the primary host of two species of tapeworms from the genus Clistobothrium; Clistobothrium carcharodoni and Clistobothrium tumidum. The former is believed to be transmitted to white sharks through the consumption of infected cetacean prey, while the transmission source of C. tumidum is unknown. The intensity of C. carcharodoni infestations can be remarkably high; in one documented case, as many as 2,533 specimens were recovered from the spiral valve of a single individual.

== Relationship with humans ==
Prior to the 1970s, the white shark as a species was known mostly to biologists and fishermen. The 1971 documentary Blue Water, White Death is credited with introducing the species to the public. Its popularity grew further following Peter Benchley's 1974 novel Jaws, and its 1975 film adaptation, directed by Steven Spielberg. Both works established the species' image as a dangerous man-eater, a characterization Benchley later regretted.

Compared to other fish, the white shark was not a significant commercial species. Although its meat was considered edible, the difficulty of capture made commercial fishing impractical. However, its size and reputation made it a popular target for sport fishing. Typically, sharks were lured with chum (ground bait) before being presented with a hook. Port Lincoln, South Australia, became a hub for white shark fishing in the 1950s. In 1959, a fisherman named Alf Dean caught a 1,208 kg (2,663 lb) shark there, setting the record for the largest fish caught by rod and reel. A larger shark caught in Streaky Bay was later disqualified due to the bait used.

=== Bites ===
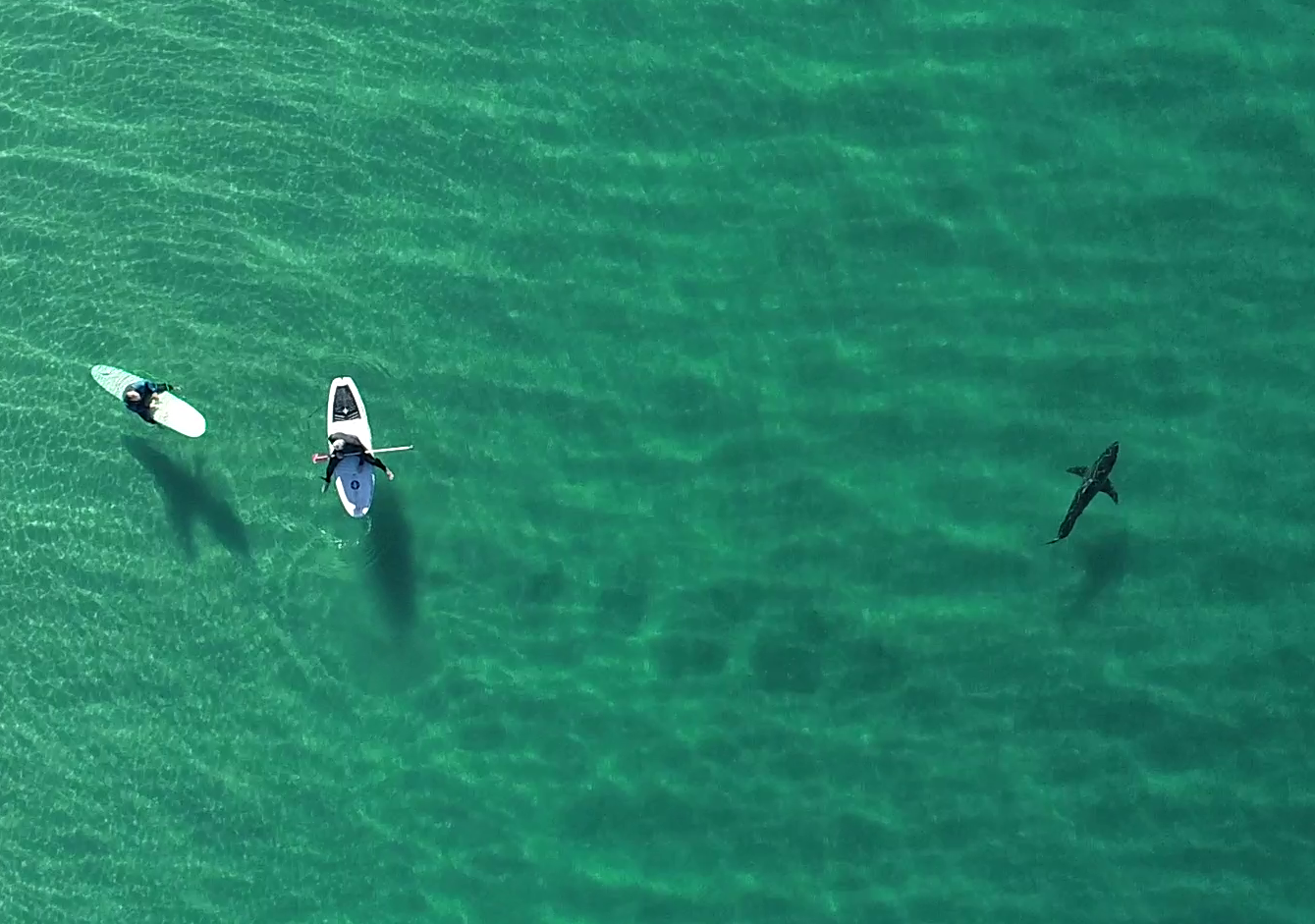
White shark near two people off southern California

Among shark species, the white shark is responsible for the largest number of recorded shark bites on humans, with 351 documented unprovoked bites since 1580 as of 2024. The majority of them have been non-fatal, while 59 resulted in death. White sharks do not appear to find humans suitable as prey, though cases of consumption have been reported. While a white shark was blamed for the Jersey Shore shark attacks of 1916, some experts suspect a bull shark was responsible.

In 1984, Tricas and McCosker proposed the "mistaken identity" hypothesis, suggesting that white sharks attack humans because surfboards create a silhouette similar to seals. A 2021 study supported this theory, concluding that sharks are likely colorblind and unable to distinguish between a seal and a swimming human. Other researchers have disputed this, proposing instead that these are "exploratory bites." A 2016 study found that most bites on surfers are too superficial to kill a seal and compared them to "test bites" made on inanimate objects. Similarly, a 2023 paper criticized the "mistaken identity" hypothesis for overemphasizing vision while neglecting other senses. The authors conclude that "sharks don't make 'mistakes' but instead continually explore their environments and routinely investigate novel objects as potential prey by biting them". A 2025 drone study of white shark "hotspots" found no documented aggression towards humans during encounters.

White sharks infrequently bite boats. Observations by Tricas and McCosker suggest that sharks are attracted to vessels by the electrical fields they generate.

=== Captivity ===
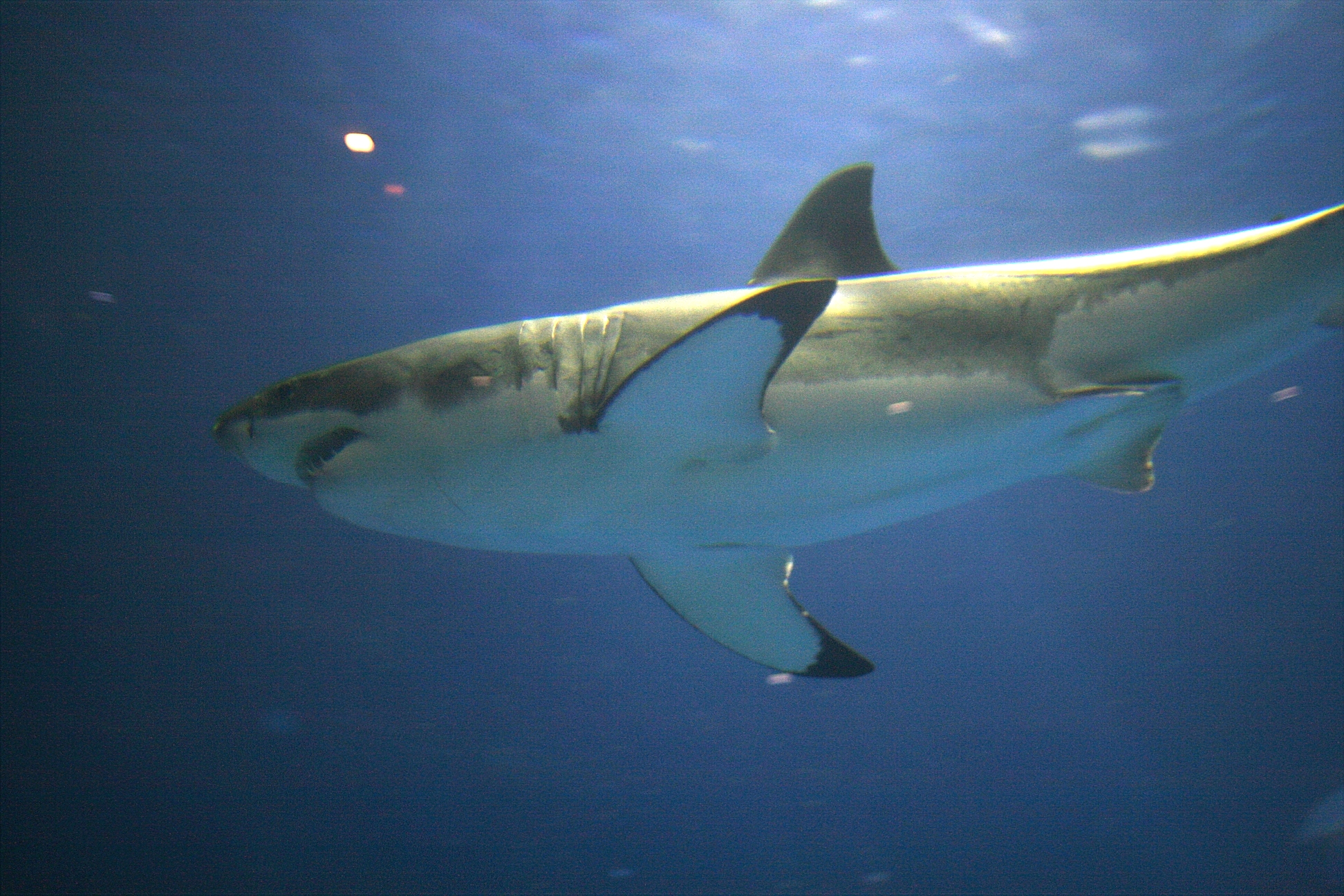
White shark at Monterey Bay Aquarium in 2006

The white shark is difficult to keep in captivity due to its large size and migratory nature. Attempts have been made since 1955 in facilities in North America, Hawaii, Australia, and South Africa. The sharks survived only for days during the earliest attempts, while in the early 1980s, aquariums like Steinhart Aquarium, Sea World San Diego, and Marineland of the Pacific were able to keep juvenile white sharks for weeks before releasing them. A major contributor to the mortality of captive white sharks was the stress of poor transport; many were accidentally captured by commercial nets and kept on fishing lines or in a tank before being handed over to aquarium staff. One famous shark named Sandy, who measured 2.3 m (7.5 ft), was kept at Steinhart for five days in August 1980 and was released after bumping into the walls.

The most successful exhibitions occurred at Monterey Bay Aquarium (MBA), which displayed six white sharks between 2004 and 2011. Researchers at universities in California attributed this success to a 4-million-US-gallon (15,000,000 L) net pen, which gave the sharks time to recover from capture before being moved. Additionally, a 3,200-US-gallon (12,000 L) portable tank allowed the sharks to swim continuously during transit. Although the sharks were 1.4–1.6 m (4.6–5.2 ft) at the start of their stay, they eventually outgrew the exhibit and required release. One shark was kept for 198 days and attracted one million visitors. Having gathered sufficient data on the species, MBA discontinued the program in 2011.

=== Tourism ===
Areas where white sharks gather have been sites for ecotourism; operators offer guest viewing from boats or from underwater shark cages. Most operators use chum to attract the sharks to the vessels. Proponents argue that these tours provide public education, fund research, and increase the economic value of living sharks relative to fishing. A study in South Australia found that these encounters improved participants' knowledge and support for shark conservation.

However, concerns persist regarding the impact of tourist interactions on shark behavior. At the Neptune Islands, researchers found that white sharks expended more energy during encounters with cage divers, but suggested population-level impacts are negligible if the frequency of encounters with any single shark is minimal. While intensive boat activity initially drove sharks away from the area, the population recovered following 2012 regulations that restricted the number of licensed operators and their days of operation. There is no strong evidence that chumming alters the feeding behavior of white sharks or conditions them to associate humans with food. The Mexican government banned white shark tourism at Guadalupe Island in January 2023. This decision followed reports of safety violations—such as swimming outside cages and improper chum handling—along with two incidents where sharks were harmed after being caught between the bars of the cages.

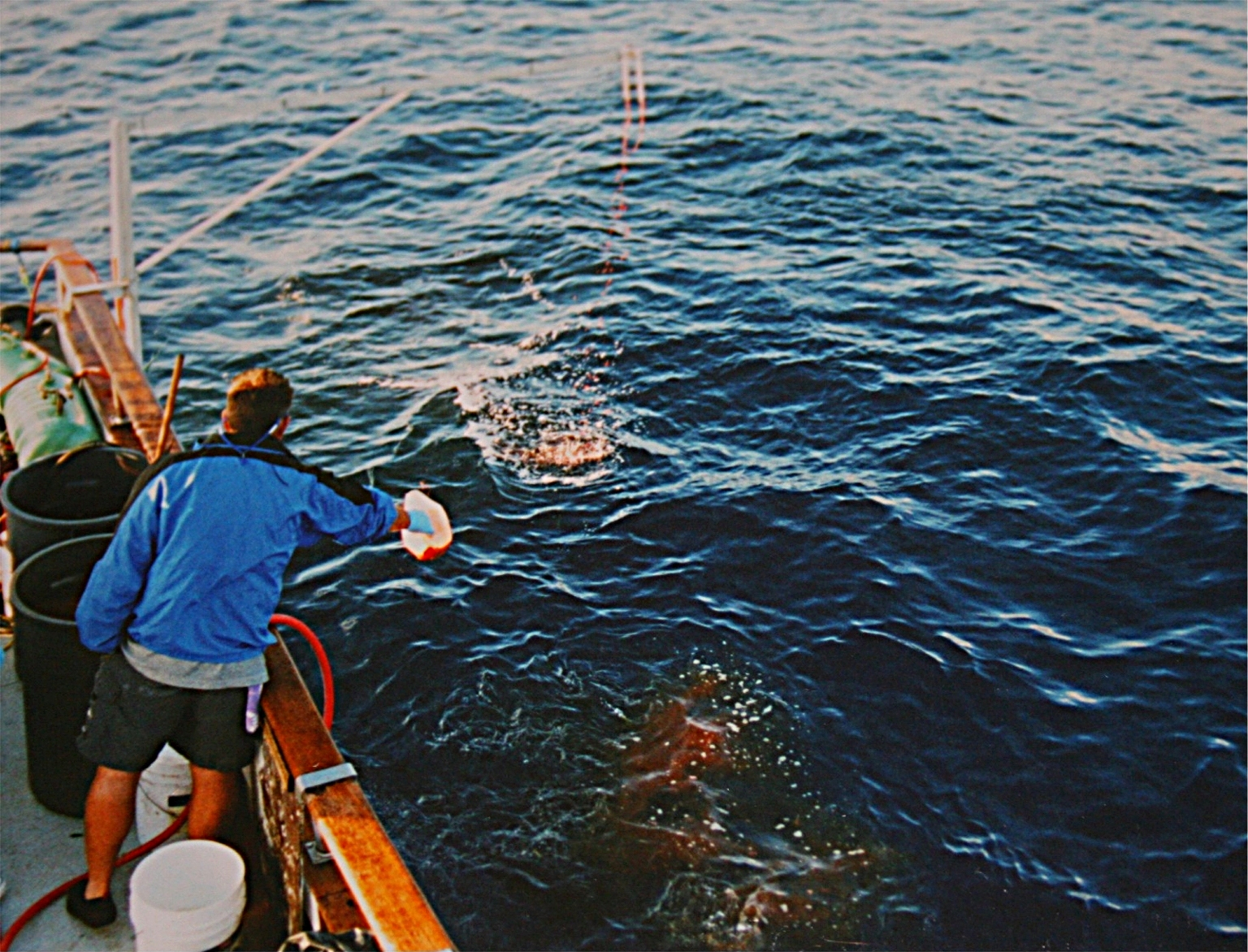
Putting chum in the water

A white shark being baited

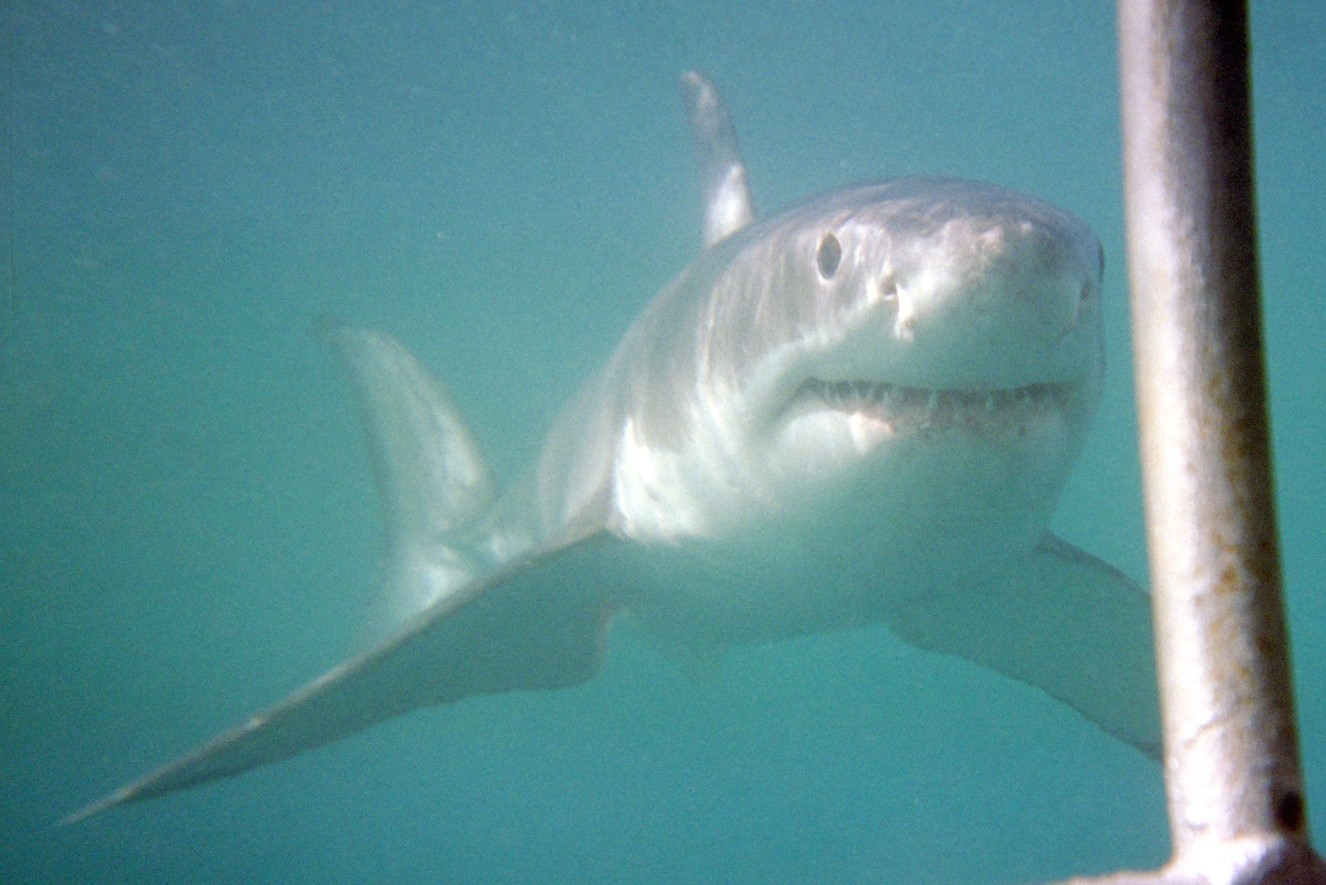
A white shark approaches divers in a cage off Dyer Island, Western Cape, South Africa

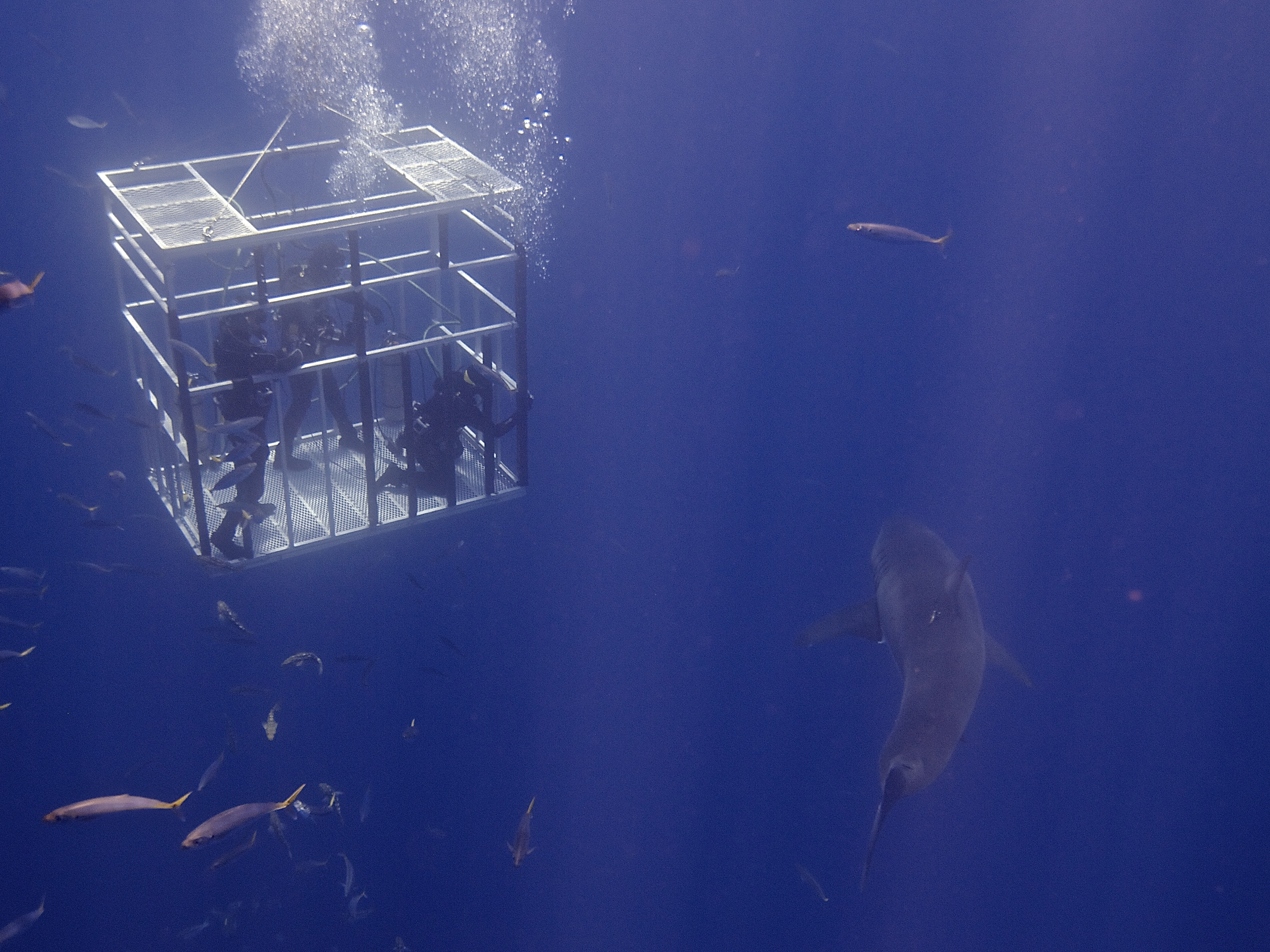
White shark near cage divers at Guadalupe

== Conservation ==
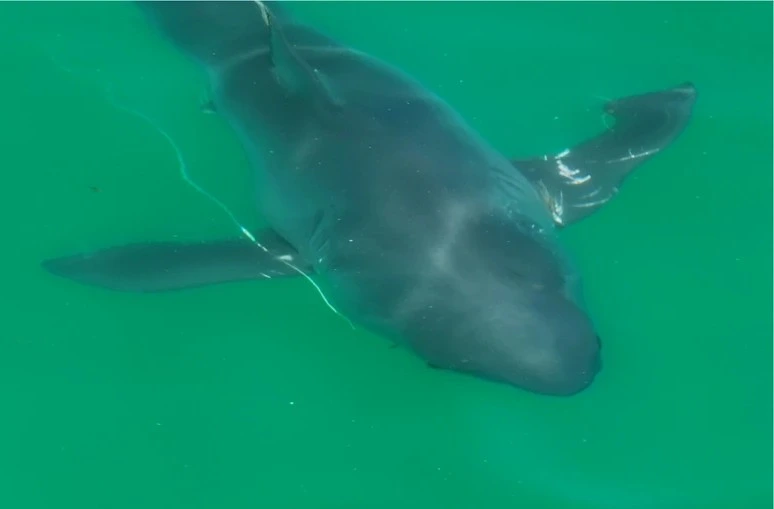
White shark with fishing wire

In 2018, the International Union for Conservation of Nature (IUCN) assessed the white shark as vulnerable worldwide, citing a population decline of 30–49% since approximately 1859. The species was further described as "moderately depleted" in 2021. The biggest threats to white sharks are accidental catching in fishing nets and the use of shark control measures—such as nets and traps—near beaches in Australia and South Africa. They nevertheless maintain a high survival rate when released from such gear. To regulate international trade, the species is listed under CITES Appendix II, requiring permits for the exchange of any specimens or parts. While a 2025 study estimated the global population at a minimum of roughly 5,800 individuals, co-author Gavin Naylor suggests the actual figure may be closer to 20,000.

=== South Africa ===
The species has been protected in South Africa since 1991; with laws banning both deliberate killing and selling. In the province of KwaZulu-Natal (KZN), the KwaZulu-Natal Sharks Board employs nets around protected beaches to mitigate the risk of shark attacks, though these are excluded from major aggregation sites. Population estimates have varied: a 1996 study estimated an average of 1,279 individuals between 1989 and 1993, while a 2004 study suggested the population had grown to 1,953 post-protection. A 2023 study concluded that white shark numbers off South Africa have remained stable since 1991, despite declines in sightings at Western Cape. Researchers suggested the population may be shifting eastward, potentially in response to orca predation. However, these findings are disputed; in 2024, it was noted that white shark catches in KZN have actually declined since 2010, casting doubt on the theory of an eastward migration.

=== Oceania ===
The white shark population is estimated to be 2,500–6,750 individuals around eastern Australia and New Zealand. In 1999, the Australian Government gave legal protection to the species under the Environmental Protection and Biodiversity Conservation (EPBC) Act, subsequently declaring it vulnerable in 2000. Similar protections exist at the state level—some predating federal law—with New South Wales, Tasmania, and Western Australia listing the species as vulnerable, and Victoria classifying it as endangered. To bolster these protections, the federal government launched the White Shark Recovery Plan in 2002 to mandate conservation research and regulate shark-related trade and tourism. An updated 2013 recovery plan reported moderate success, with 14 of its 34 original objectives completed. A study in 2012 found that Australia's white shark population is separated by the Bass Strait into genetically distinct eastern and western populations, necessitating regionalized conservation strategies.

Population declines prior to protection were driven by commercial and sport fishing, along with entanglement in beach protection netting. By 2013, incidental deaths from commercial and recreational fishing had decreased, yet the population had not fully recovered. Despite federal protections, white sharks are still killed in state-run "shark control" programs (shark culling) intended to reduce attacks. Queensland and New South Wales continue to use nets and traps, which contribute to declining numbers in eastern Australia. Critics argue these programs are ineffective at preventing fatalities and advocate for alternatives such as helicopter patrols, acoustic tagging, and real-time social media tracking. While Western Australia implemented a cull in 2013, it was discontinued the following year following a recommendation from the state's Environmental Protection Authority.

In April 2007, white sharks were given full protection within New Zealand waters 370 km (230 mi) from land, and from New Zealand-flagged vessels operating internationally. Violations carry penalties of up to a $250,000 fine and six months' imprisonment. In June 2018 the New Zealand Department of Conservation classified the white shark under the New Zealand Threat Classification System as "Nationally Endangered" due to its small, stable of between 250–1000 mature individuals. This classification carries the qualifiers "Data Poor", "Threatened Overseas", and "Conservation Dependent".

=== United States ===
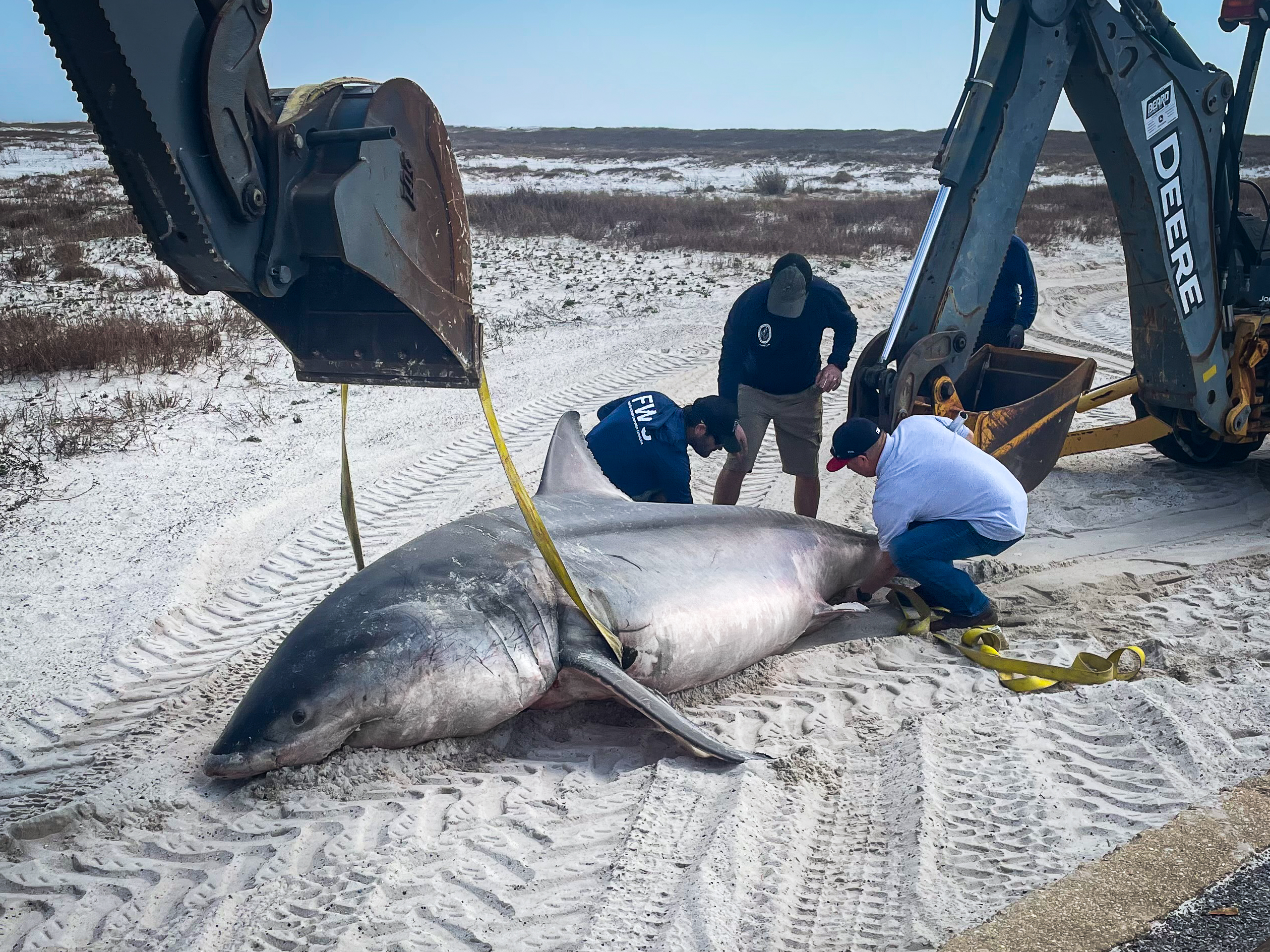
Beached white shark in Florida

Since 1997, the US federal government has prohibited the harvesting of white sharks in US waters, requiring that any incidentally caught shark be released immediately. Management of the species is split by region: the 2006 Consolidated Atlantic Highly Migratory Species Fishery Management Plan covers the Atlantic, while the Pacific Fishery Management Council oversees the Pacific. The white shark also receives protection in National Marine Sanctuaries managed by the National Oceanic and Atmospheric Administration.

Some states provide additional safeguards. California has protected the species within its waters (up to 3 miles (4.8 km) offshore) since 1994 and in 2013, added white sharks to the California Endangered Species Act, which introduced strict permit requirements for both scientific research and incidental bycatch. In 2019, the state further banned the use of bait, chum, or decoys to lure white sharks in state waters and prohibited their use within one nautical mile of any shoreline or pier when a shark is present. A 2014 study estimated the white shark population along the California coastline to be approximately 2,400 individuals.

Massachusetts also provides state-level protection, having prohibited the capture of white sharks in 2005 and banning the use of chum or bait to lure them in 2015. In 2025, authorities restricted shore-based fishing around Cape Cod in response to viral videos of anglers catching white sharks. The shark population has benefited significantly from the surge in seal numbers following the Marine Mammal Protection Act in 1972, and as many as 800 individual white sharks are documented visiting the Cape Cod area.

=== Europe and the Mediterranean ===
In 2015 and 2016, the IUCN designated the white shark as critically endangered in European and Mediterranean waters, respectively. Several factors contributed to this designation, including the region's genetic isolation, the species' slow growth rate, a broad decline in large shark populations, and a persistent negative public perception. The IUCN suggests that fewer than 250 mature white sharks remain in European waters, with most concentrated in the Mediterranean.

Research indicates a significant downward trend: a 2017 study noted a decrease in the average size of Mediterranean white sharks, a possible sign of a struggling population. A 2020 analysis of records from 1860 to 2016 found that while sightings peaked in the 1880s and 1980s, there has been a 61% decrease since 1975. Furthermore, a 2025 study reported only four sightings in the last decade, compared to an average of ten per year between 1985 and 1995. While there is no targeted commercial fishery, white sharks are often harpooned as perceived threats or as pests that interfere with fishing gear. The decline of prey like bluefin tuna and Mediterranean monk seals is also a major threat.

The white shark is protected as an endangered species by every coastal Mediterranean nation under the Barcelona Convention of 1978 (amended in 1995), while in 2009, the European Commission banned their capture. An EU-funded program managed to successfully release a juvenile white shark caught as bycatch around Lampedusa in 2023. Researchers have highlighted this as an example of how partnerships between the scientific community and local fishers can aid conservation efforts.

== See also ==
- List of sharks
- List of threatened sharks
- Outline of sharks – Overview of and topical guide to sharks
- Otodus obliquus – Extinct species of shark
