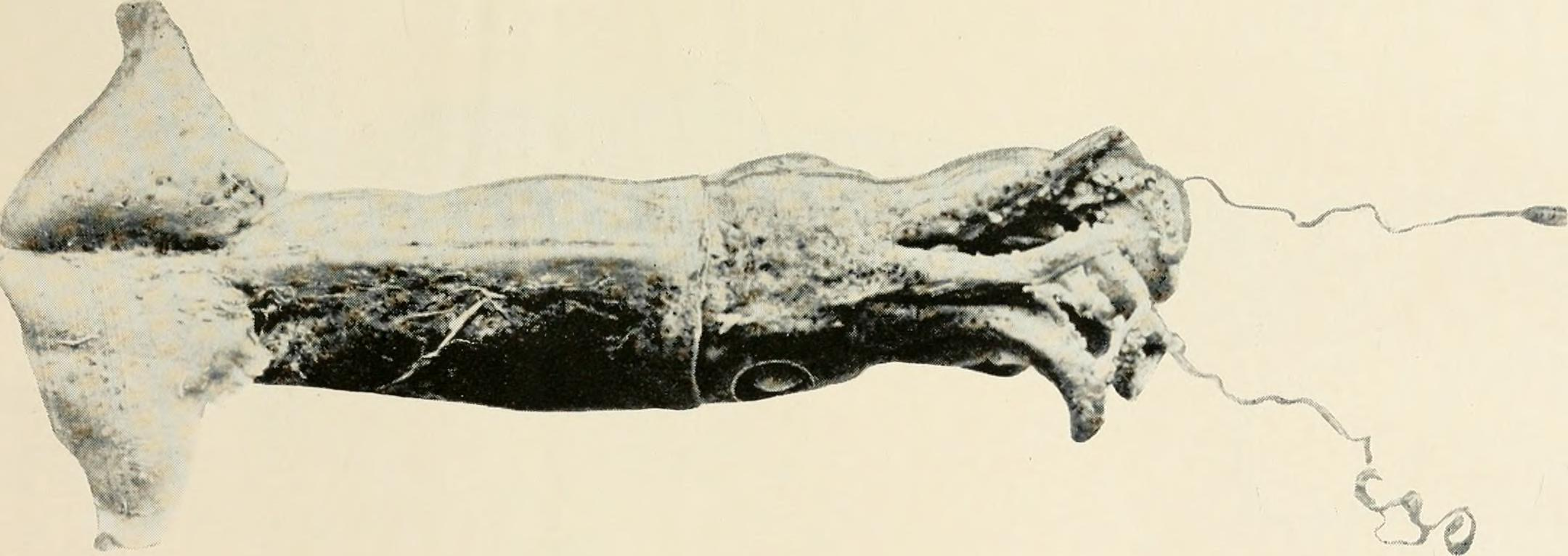

Scientific classification
- Kingdom: Animalia
- Phylum: Mollusca
- Class: Cephalopoda
- Order: Oegopsida
- Family: Lycoteuthidae
- Subfamily: Lycoteuthinae
- Genus: Nematolampas; Berry, 1913

Type species
- Nematolampas regalis Berry, 1913

= Nematolampas =

Genus of squids

Nematolampas is a genus of squid from the family Lycoteuthidae. The genus comprises two species, both of which are known from only a few males. The type species, Nematolampas regalis has been recorded from the subtropical South Pacific and the second species, Nematolampas venezuelensis, is from the tropical western North Atlantic. The main distinguishing feature of this genus is that arms III are very elongated and thread-like and have no suckers near their tips. As only males have been captured it is not known if this feature is present in females.

== Species ==
There are currently two species classified under this genus:

- Nematolampas regalis Berry, 1913
- Nematolampas venezuelensis Arocha, 2003
