= Lampadioteuthis =

Conservation status
- Least Concern (IUCN 3.1)

Scientific classification
- Kingdom: Animalia
- Phylum: Mollusca
- Class: Cephalopoda
- Order: Oegopsida
- Superfamily: Enoploteuthoidea
- Family: Lampadioteuthidae; Berry, 1916
- Genus: Lampadioteuthis; Berry, 1916
- Species: L. megaleia

Binomial name
- Lampadioteuthis megaleia Berry, 1916

Genus of squids

Lampadioteuthis megaleia is a small, colorful squid, the only species in the only genus in the monotypic family Lampadioteuthidae. It is sometimes known as the wonderful firefly squid. It was formerly classified in the family Lycoteuthidae, but differs from them mainly by having a hectocotylus in the males and by the possession of a rostrum on the gladius.

== Description ==
Lampadioteuthis megaleia is a small squid which grows to a mantle length of 40 mm. In males the right ventral arm is hectocotylized with an enlarged protective membrane over the mid-arm. It has four ocular photophores, arranged as three in a ventral line and one positioned laterally. The tentacles have five photophores which are set on a stalk. There are circular anal photophores on either side of the rectum, single elongated branchial photophores lie at the base of each gill, there are no abdominal photophores and a single photophore is situated to the rear of the abdomen between the inner surface of mantle and the viscera. There are a lot of functional chromatophores which are covered by a violet pigmented external skin. The males have a penis.

== Distribution ==
Lampadioteuthis megaleia occurs in the subtropical North Atlantic Ocean in the Gulf Stream and the northern Sargasso Sea and in the southwestern Pacific Ocean. Its type locality is the Kermadec Islands, in the South Pacific Ocean, In the eastern North Atlantic it has been reported from between the Azores and Spain south to 25°N while in the western North Atlantic it has been recorded at 40°N.

== Habitat and biology ==
Lampadioteuthis megaleia is found in the upper mesopelagic to epipelagic zones. Little is known about its life history but the violet pigmentation in the skin lying over its photophores is assumed to act as a colour filter which enables the bioluminescence to be a closer match to the colour of the sun or moonlight downwelling from the surface. The photophores of species of squid in the genus Lycoteuthis have a very similar type of detached filter. Small, less than 8mm in mantle length, subadults have been found which are very similar to adults, except that some of the body proportions differ, the size of the photophores and only having the large photophore at the base of each tentacle. The paralarva are planktonic.
