= Lycoteuthis springeri =

Conservation status
- Data Deficient (IUCN 3.1)

Scientific classification
- Kingdom: Animalia
- Phylum: Mollusca
- Class: Cephalopoda
- Order: Oegopsida
- Family: Lycoteuthidae
- Genus: Lycoteuthis
- Species: L. springeri

Binomial name
- Lycoteuthis springeri Voss, 1956

Synonyms
- Oregoniateuthis springeri Voss, 1956

Species of squid

Lycoteuthis springeri is a small species of rarely captured squid from the family Lycoteuthidae. It has three photophores on the posterior portion of the abdomen and the males have a long tail which bears seven deeply embedded long and thin photophores. The males also have photophores on arms II and III, as well as on the head and the mantle. The tentacular clubs and the structure of the suckers on the club and arm are not distinctive. Two of the known specimens were males which had mantle lengths of 80mm and 97mm. The type locality was in the Gulf of Mexico and the holotype was found in the stomach of a shark which was captured at 367m.
