= Selenoteuthis =

Conservation status
- Least Concern (IUCN 3.1)

Scientific classification
- Kingdom: Animalia
- Phylum: Mollusca
- Class: Cephalopoda
- Order: Oegopsida
- Family: Lycoteuthidae
- Genus: Selenoteuthis; Voss, 1958
- Species: S. scintillans

Binomial name
- Selenoteuthis scintillans Voss, 1959

Genus of squids

Selenoteuthis is a monotypic genus of squid from the family Lycoteuthidae. Its sole species is the small tropical and subtropical North Atlantic species, Selenoteuthis scintillans, the moon squid.
