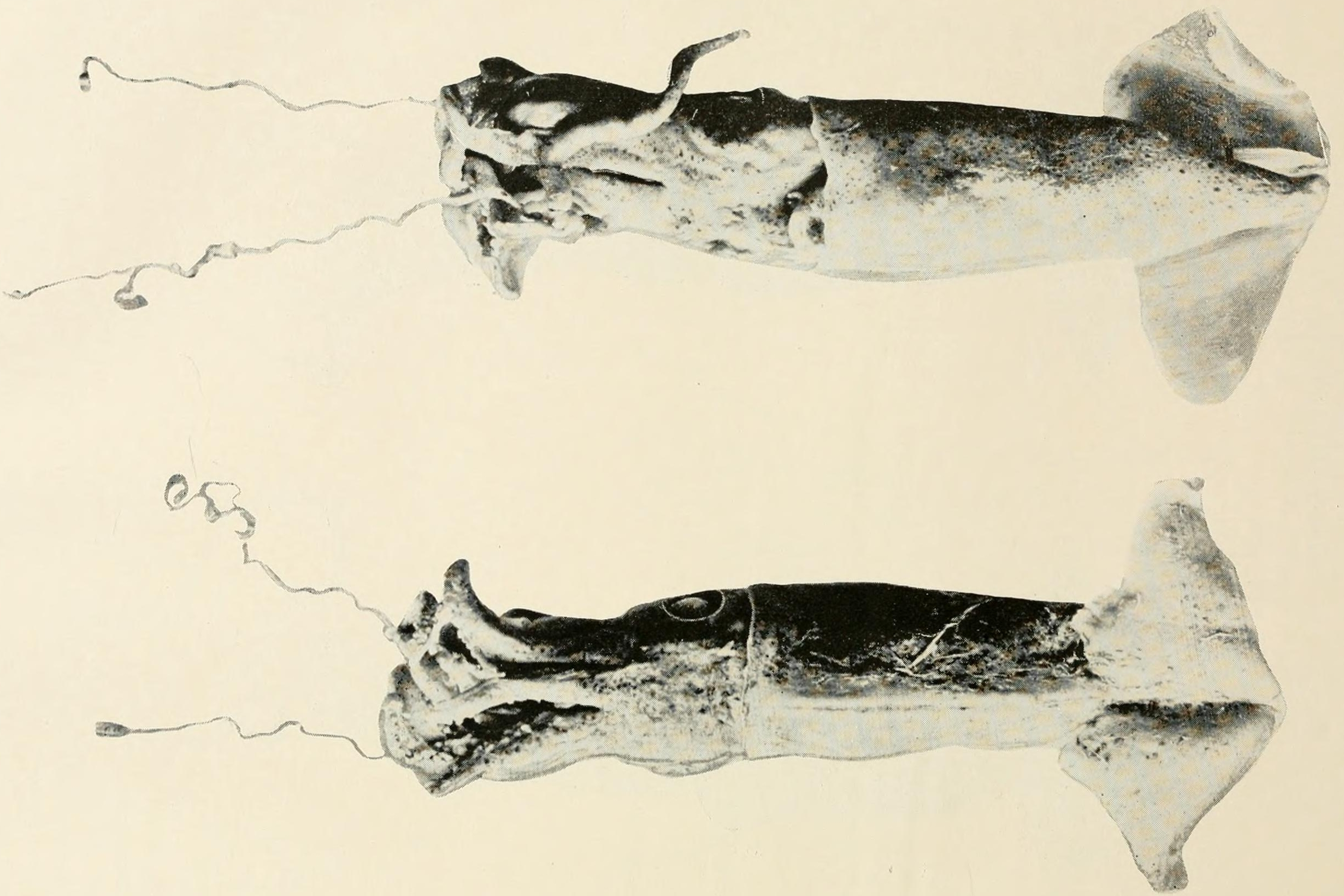

Conservation status
- Data Deficient (IUCN 3.1)

Scientific classification
- Kingdom: Animalia
- Phylum: Mollusca
- Class: Cephalopoda
- Order: Oegopsida
- Family: Lycoteuthidae
- Genus: Nematolampas
- Species: N. regalis

Binomial name
- Nematolampas regalis Berry, 1913

= Nematolampas regalis =

Species of squid

Nematolampas regalis, the regal firefly squid is a small, little-known species of squid from the family Lycoteuthidae which is found in the subtropical South Pacific Ocean. This squid has a mantle length of 30 mm (1.2 in). It may be sexually dimorphic, with the males possibly having very thin elongated arms III, which are increasingly thread like towards their tips, where they do not have any suckers. Arms II are "normal" and have suckers along their length. The third arms have a series of photophores along their length, and there is a small photophore located on each of the tips of arms I and II. The tentacles have two embedded photophores and the largest of the eye's photophores is in the centre. There is a pair of large photophores close to the tip of the mantle on the ventral side mantle, with no other photophores on the body except for a visceral photophore which is also near the tip. There is practically no tail.

N. regalis is known only from the Kermadec Islands near New Zealand; one of the specimens was beached while the other two were caught by a trawl at a depth of 48m.
