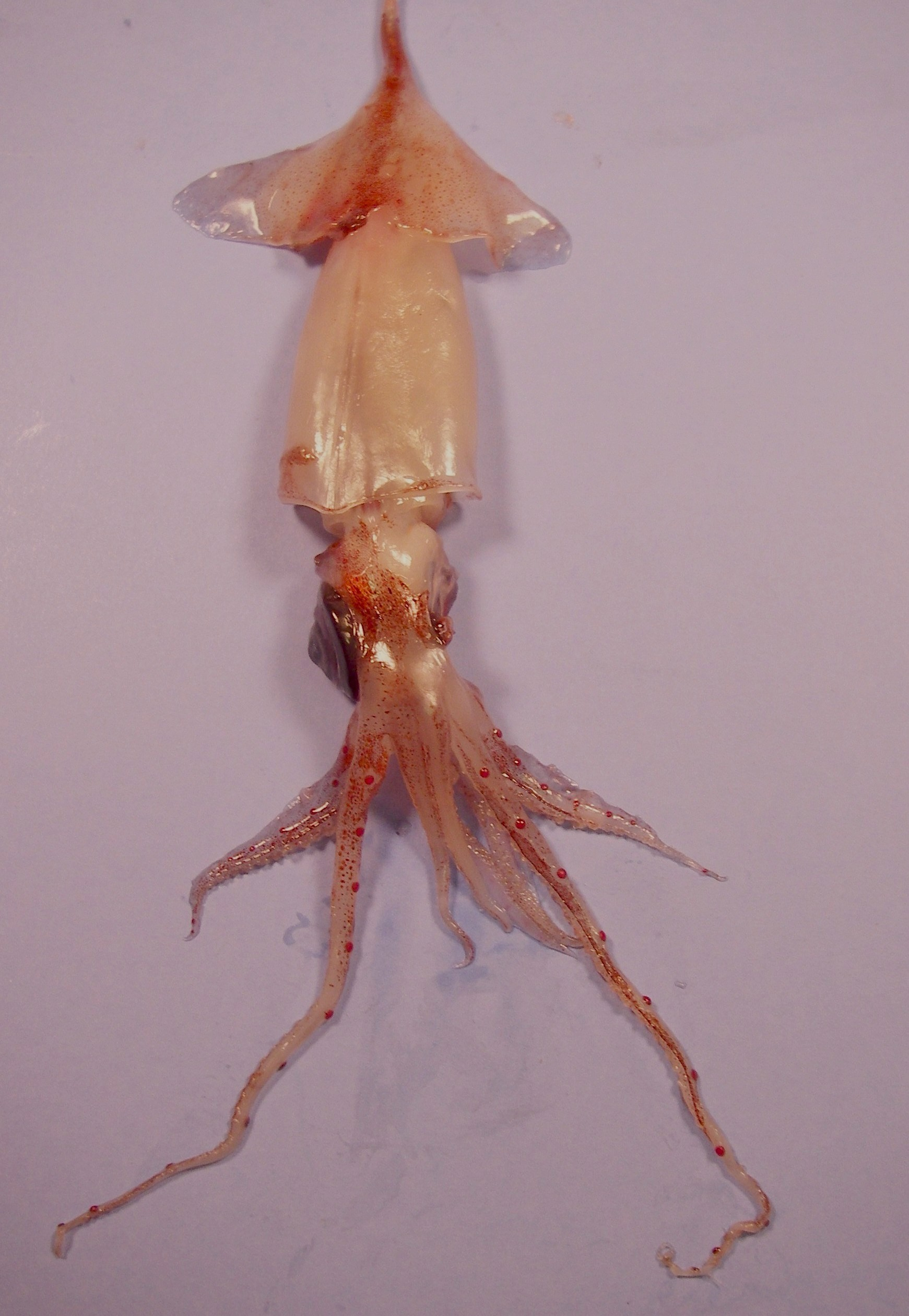
- Lampadioteuthis megaleia

Scientific classification
- Domain: Eukaryota
- Kingdom: Animalia
- Phylum: Mollusca
- Class: Cephalopoda
- Order: Oegopsida
- Superfamily: Enoploteuthoidea
- Family: Lycoteuthidae; Pfeffer, 1908

Type genus
- Lycoteuthis Pfeffer, 1900

Genera
- See text

= Lycoteuthidae =

Family of squids

The Lycoteuthidae are a family of squid comprising three known genera. They are small muscular squid, characterised by a lack of hooks and by photophores present on the viscera, eyeballs and tentacles. They inhabit tropical and subtropical seas where the diel migrants stay down in the mesopelagic zone during the day and migrate to the surface to feed at night. Some species show strong sexual dimorphism.

== Species ==
Family Lycoteuthidae

- Genus Lycoteuthis
  - Lycoteuthis lorigera
  - Lycoteuthis springeri
- Genus Nematolampas
  - Nematolampas regalis
  - Nematolampas venezuelensis
- Genus Selenoteuthis
  - Selenoteuthis scintillans
