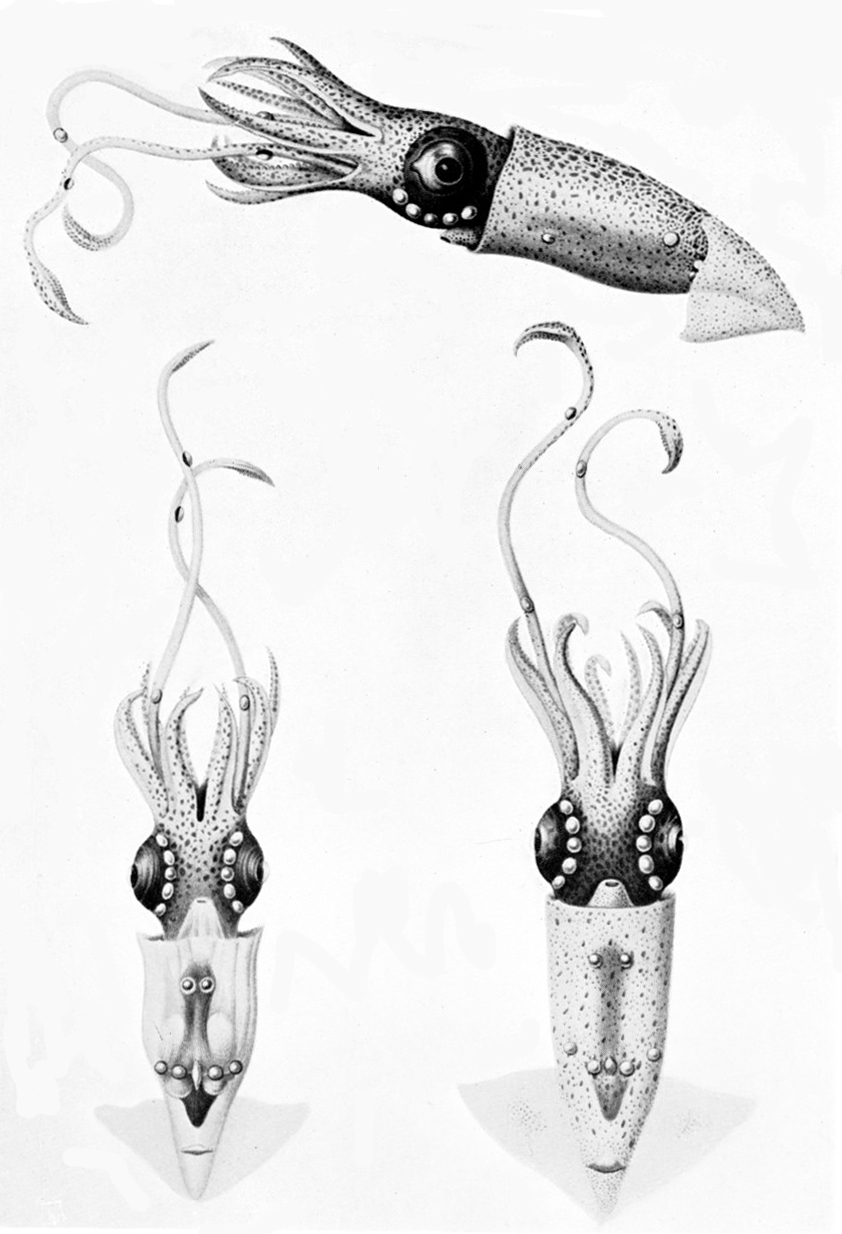

Conservation status
- Least Concern (IUCN 3.1)

Scientific classification
- Kingdom: Animalia
- Phylum: Mollusca
- Class: Cephalopoda
- Order: Oegopsida
- Family: Lycoteuthidae
- Genus: Lycoteuthis
- Species: L. lorigera

Binomial name
- Lycoteuthis lorigera Steenstrup, 1875

Synonyms
- Asthenoteuthion planctonicum Pfeffer, 1912; Enoploteuthis diadema Chun, 1900; Leptodontoteuthis inermis Robson, 1926; Lycoteuthis diadema (Chun, 1900); Lycoteuthis jattai Pfeffer, 1900; Onychoteuthis longimanus Steenstrup, 1857; Onychoteuthis lorigera Steenstrup, 1875

= Lycoteuthis lorigera =

Species of squid

Lycoteuthis lorigera is a species of squid in the genus Lycoteuthis. They grow up to 8 cm (3.1 in) in length.

Males of Lycoteuthis lorigera males can grow to between 136 mm to 194 mm, while females grow to between 88 mm to 110 mm. Males have paired spermatophoric and terminal organs. Both are functional.

They use a serial spawning strategy, the spawning of several egg masses, which exposes eggs to variable environmental circumstances and increases the chance of encountering a beneficial regime for development. The number of ripe eggs in the oviducts suggests that batches of spawned egg masses contain between 1,000 and 4,000 eggs.

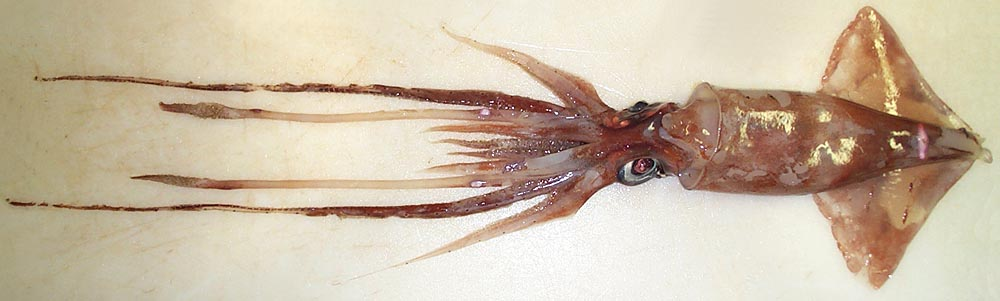
Male from sub-Antarctic waters near New Zealand (51°58′S 171°40′E), caught in bottom trawl at 520 m depth

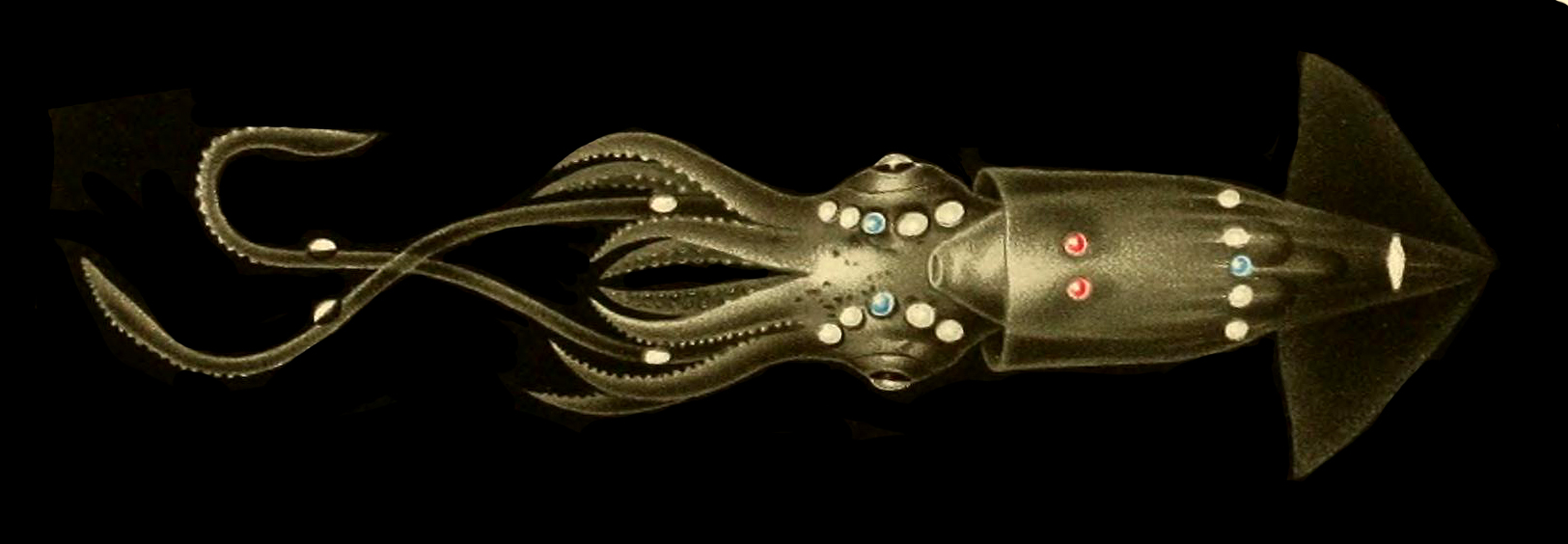
Lycoteuthis lorigera from Carl Chun's Die Cephalopoden (1910)
