= Nematolampas venezuelensis =

Conservation status
- Data Deficient (IUCN 3.1)

Scientific classification
- Kingdom: Animalia
- Phylum: Mollusca
- Class: Cephalopoda
- Order: Oegopsida
- Family: Lycoteuthidae
- Genus: Nematolampas
- Species: N. venezuelensis

Binomial name
- Nematolampas venezuelensis Arocha, 2003

Species of squid

Nematolampas venezuelensis is a squid small in size (58–88mm). This squid can be found in tropical waters off the coast of Venezuela in the Caribbean Sea, Western North Atlantic. The data for this species has been gathered from four immature squids captured in the tropical waters off the coast of Venezuela in the Caribbean Sea, Western North Atlantic.

Diagnosis

- Elongate arms II (only males)
- With arms II sucker less, filamentous tips and bearing numerous photophores

Characteristics

- Arms

- Arms II and III are greatly elongated and have filamentous suckerless tips

- Arms III are longer and more robust than arms II

- Beak

- Sharp beak

== Description ==
Little is known of this species. One study has been done on this squid with four immature males that were relatively different in size. They are found in tropical waters but little about what they consume is known. They are equipped with small sharp beaks so it is thought they prey on small fish and marine organisms. Their arms vary in length and arms II and III are greatly elongated and have filamentous suckerless tips. However arms III are longer and more robust than arms II. There does not seem to be an abundance of these squids; they are scarcely seen or consumed by humans. During the day they take refuge in the deeper waters and at night swim closer to the surface.
