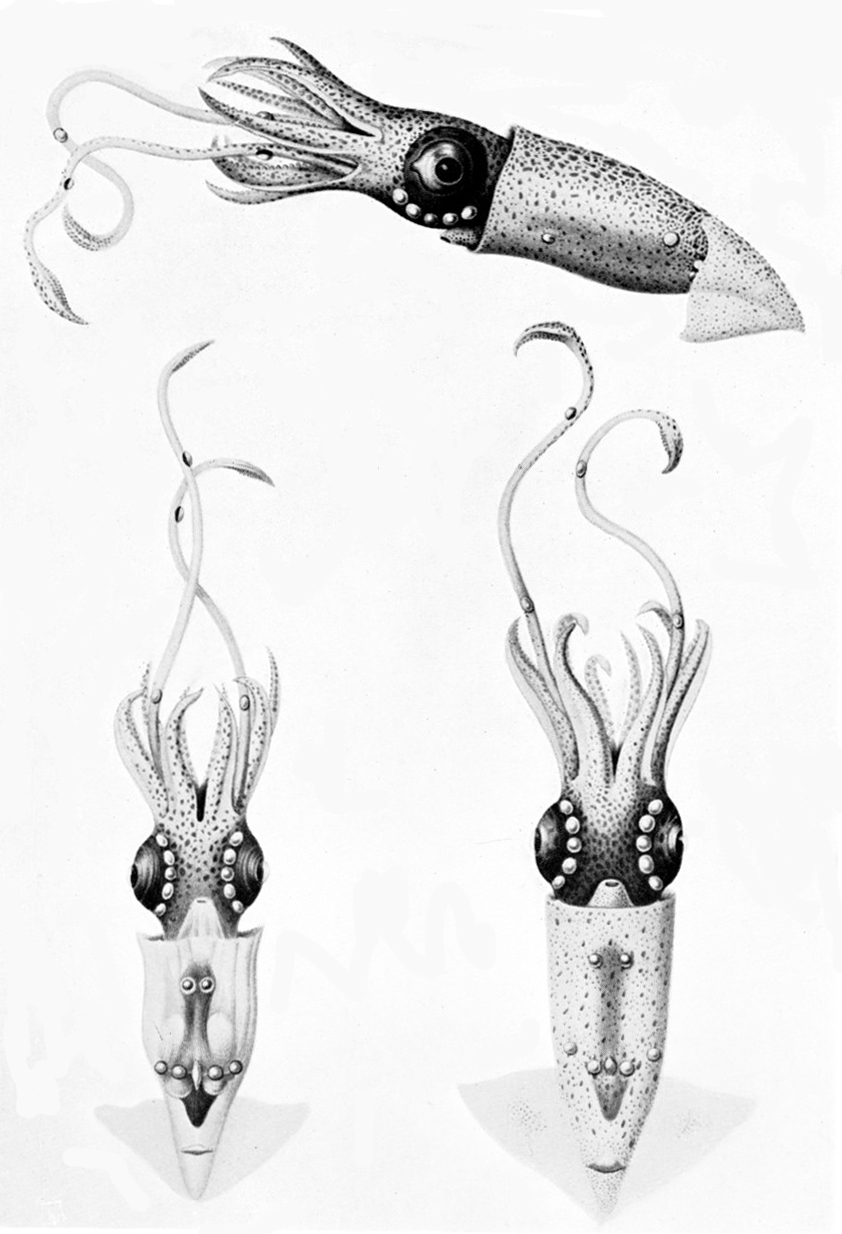
- Lycoteuthis lorigera

Scientific classification
- Kingdom: Animalia
- Phylum: Mollusca
- Class: Cephalopoda
- Order: Oegopsida
- Family: Lycoteuthidae
- Subfamily: Lycoteuthinae
- Genus: Lycoteuthis; Pfeffer, 1900

Type species
- Lycoteuthis jattai Pfeffer, 1900

Species
- Lycoteuthis lorigera (Steenstrup, 1875); Lycoteuthis springeri (Voss, 1956); Lycoteuthis diadema (Chun, 1956)

Synonyms
- Asthenoteuthion Pfeffer, 1912; Leptodontoteuthis Robson, 1926; Oregoniateuthis Voss, 1956; Thaumatolampas Chun, 1903

= Lycoteuthis =

Genus of squids

Lycoteuthis is a genus containing two species of squid: Lycoteuthis springeri and Lycoteuthis lorigera. They are small animals which grow up to 8 cm (3.1 in) in length.

These squid live in the deep sea at depths of up to 3000 metres, making horizontal migrations within their range along the steep shelves.

Lycoteuthis are particularly characterised by their photophores, shining organs which give them their German name "Miracle Lamps". The photophores are located in various parts of the body, with males having them on their mantle and head. The light of these photophores results from bioluminescence. The photophores serve as camouflage, since the body appears almost transparent by the light effects and normally visible structures, such as the eyes, lose their sharp outline.
