= The Search for the Giant Squid =

1998 book by Richard Ellis

- Cover of first edition (hardcover), featuring a giant squid painted by the author
- Author: Richard Ellis
- Language: English
- Publisher: Lyons Press (1st edition)
- Publication date: September 1, 1998 (1st edition)
- Publication place: United States
- Media type: Print (hardcover, paperback)
- Pages: ix + 322
- ISBN: 978-1-55821-689-1
- OCLC: 245720219
- Dewey Decimal: 594/.58
- LC Class: QL430.3.A73
- Identifiers refer to the first edition

The Search for the Giant Squid is a non-fiction book by Richard Ellis on the biology, history and mythology of the giant squid of the genus Architeuthis. (Note: Though it focuses on the true giant squid (genus Architeuthis), the book also briefly discusses other large squid taxa, including Mesonychoteuthis hamiltoni (now more widely known as the colossal squid), Taningia danae, Moroteuthis robusta (now known as Onykia robusta), and Galiteuthis phyllura.) It was well received upon its release in 1998. Though soon rendered outdated by important developments in giant squid research, it is still considered an important reference on the subject.

== History ==
Historically, the giant squid was only known from dead or dying specimens, and it was only in the 21st century that it was studied alive in its natural habitat.

=== Background ===
Ellis wrote a chapter about the giant squid for his 1994 book, Monsters of the Sea, and said he "was so intrigued by this critter" that it led him to write "an entire book about Architeuthis". The Search for the Giant Squid incorporates text from both Monsters of the Sea and a 1997 article on museum models of giant squid published in Curator: The Museum Journal. It followed a number of shorter publications by Ellis on the subject of giant squid that appeared between 1994 and 1998. To gather material for his book, Ellis spoke to giant squid expert Clyde Roper during the latter's preparations for his (ultimately unsuccessful) January–March 1997 expedition to New Zealand in search of the giant squid. Responding to a comment about the paucity of available information on the giant squid, Ellis said: "There's not that much known, but there's a lot you can write about what's not known, why it isn't known and who doesn't know it." In 2003, Ellis explained: "I wrote The Search for the Giant Squid to try and dispel some of the crazy ideas that this cephalopod is in any way dangerous to humans".

=== Publication ===
The first hardback edition was published by Lyons Press on September 1, 1998; a paperback edition by Penguin Books followed on October 1, 1999. Robert Hale released a hardback edition for the British market in 1999, and an Italian translation by Edizioni Piemme (as Il Calamaro Gigante; translated by Maria Teresa Marenco) appeared the same year. In 2002, a German translation was published by Heel Verlag (as Riesenkraken der Tiefsee; translated by Kurt Beginnen).

=== Subsequent developments ===
The book was published at a time when there were still no known photographs of a live giant squid, which Ellis described as "the most elusive image in natural history". This soon changed as the first years of the 21st century saw a number of breakthroughs in live giant squid imaging that ultimately culminated in the first recordings of live animals in their natural deep-water habitat in July 2012. These events marked a turning point in the scientific understanding of the giant squid's life history and biology, which Ellis himself discussed in a TV interview, commenting: "now my book is a little obsolete".

== Content ==
Table of contents (1st ed.)
Chapter	Title
1	Introducing Architeuthis
2	Is the Sea Monster a Giant Squid?
3	The Biology of Squids, Giant and Otherwise
4	By What Name Shall We Call the Giant Squid?
5	Architeuthis Appears
6	What Do We Know About Architeuthis?
7	Battle of the Giants
8	The Giant Squid in Literature and Cinema
9	The Models of Architeuthis
10	Conclusion

The book consists of ten chapters covering the biology, mythology and history of the giant squid, as well as popular culture depictions and notable models thereof. An appendix lists all "authenticated giant squid sightings and strandings" known to the author (expanded from a similar list in Ellis's Monsters of the Sea), comprising 166 entries and spanning five centuries, from 1545 to 1996. The extensive bibliography numbers some 600 references spread across 38 pages.

Apart from the cover, the book is illustrated exclusively with black-and-white images, including 30 photographs and 35 line drawings.

== Reception ==
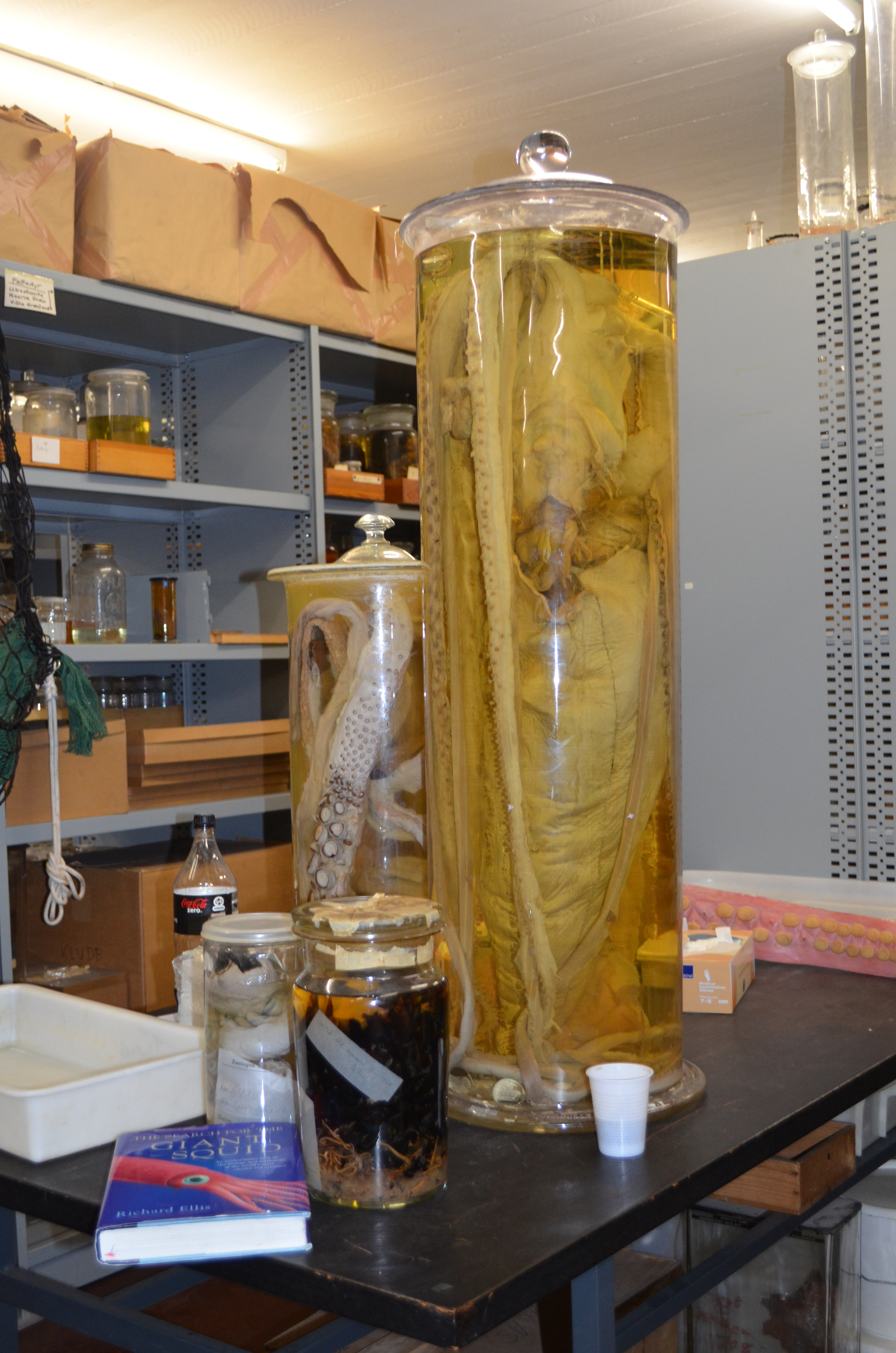
A copy of the book alongside various giant squid specimens at the Zoological Museum in Copenhagen

=== Early reviews ===
The Search for the Giant Squid was generally well received upon its release. It was a Publishers Weekly 1998 Best Book of the Year.

Clyde Roper, considered the world's foremost expert on Architeuthis at the time, commented:

Ellis [has] the freedom and luxury to dredge into the depths of mythology, fantasy, fiction, and undocumented 'eyewitness' accounts, as well as into the scientific literature, itself not entirely free from imagination. The mix of all these sources, dissected and analyzed with an appropriate dash of skepticism, and an occasional pinch of speculation, yields a volume that surely will be read and re-read by the full range of readers from monster-lovers to scientists.

Martin Wells, a zoologist at the University of Cambridge, considered the book "serious and very well researched" and a "gold-mine of fact and fantasy, for we scientists who work on cephalopods and for all of us who love monsters". Reviewing the work for The New York Times Book Review, Laura Miller agreed that it was "rigorously researched", but opined that some pages "contain more data than anyone but the most devoted squid buff could desire". This sentiment was echoed by David Wicinas in the University of Pennsylvania's Gazette, who wrote that though the book is "painstakingly researched [...] the sheer amount of data may daunt all but the most motivated readers".

Biologist and author E. O. Wilson praised Ellis's writing style, remarking that he "uses his exceptional gifts in image and words to evoke the wonder and mystery of the sea". While giving an overall positive appraisal, Michael Dirda, writing for The Washington Post, commented that "Ellis's easygoing prose suffers from needless repetitions [...] The Search for the Giant Squid could have been more tightly edited and [...] just a bit flashier". But he concluded that "Ellis is fun to read, knowledgeable and enthusiastic" and praised Lyons Press for producing "a beautiful book, starting with its striking dust jacket (the author's own painting of a reddish giant squid with an enormous staring eye) and continuing with generous margins, thick paper and lots of drawings and photographs". The visual aspects of the work were also singled out as a strength in a review for Publishers Weekly, particularly its "30 b&w photographs and 35 line drawings, many historical, several of the drawings by Ellis himself".

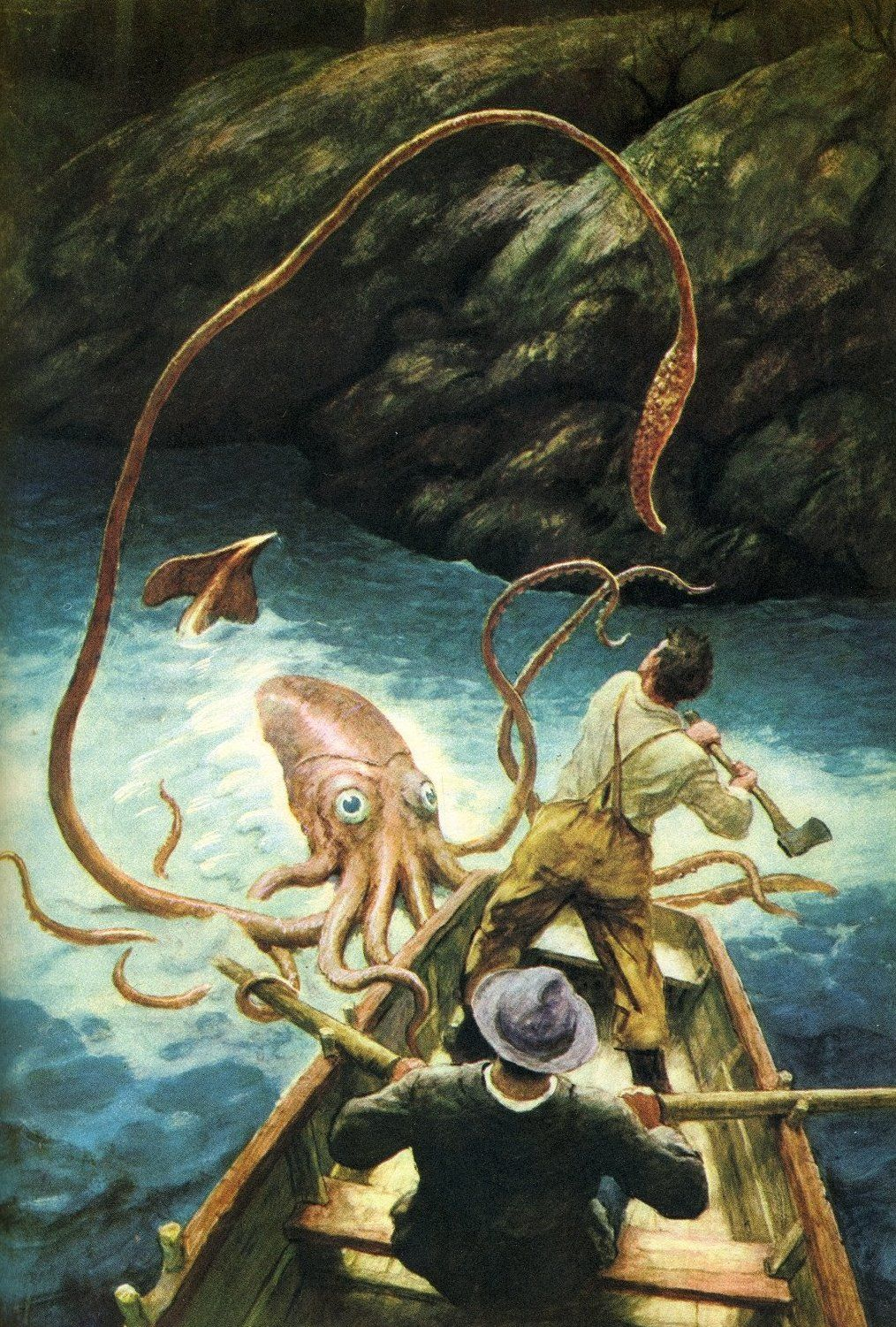
The Adventure of the Giant Squid by N. C. Wyeth (c. 1939), used as the cover illustration on certain editions of Ellis's Monsters of the Sea. Though fictional accounts often involve giant squid attacking boats, live animals found at the surface are almost invariably sick or dying, and no injuries resulting from such encounters have ever been documented.

In a review for Whole Earth magazine, Jaron Lanier wrote: "Richard Ellis has written the definitive giant squid book, achieving a superb blend of scientific reporting and cultural history." Similarly, in the malacological journal Folia Malacologica, Beata Pokryszko concluded that the "book combines history, zoology, adventure and myth in an admirable way", and the Publishers Weekly review described it as "an absorbing work of natural history and a classic of cryptozoology", in which "Ellis vivifies and celebrates [the giant squid] with erudition and consummate skill". Neurologist and writer Oliver Sacks likewise thought that Ellis had done a "splendid job bringing together virtually every known account (mythical, fictional, and factual), and producing a narrative at once gripping and meticulously balanced". Peter Benchley, whose 1991 novel Beast features a giant squid as its primary antagonist, wrote: "In researching an animal about which so little is known, Richard Ellis has managed to assemble an astonishing amount of material [...] This is an amazing book about an amazing creature."

The Search for the Giant Squid was briefly featured in the March 1999 issue of Scientific American, under "The editors recommend", where it was noted for providing "a huge amount of information". Russian teuthologist Kir Nesis, one of the world's foremost cephalopod experts at the time, described it as an "interesting popular science book" and noted its comprehensive bibliography. A Booklist review called it "a fascinating compendium" and opined that "Ellis's illustrated books about sea creatures have long made delectable reading". David K. Bulloch, author of Underwater Naturalist and The Wasted Ocean, wrote: "Ellis has assembled a potpourri of ancient myth, rare sightings, and occasional bodily remains into a mosaic on Architeuthis, the Kraken, cryptic squids of the abyssal depths".

Reviewing both The Search for the Giant Squid and Monsters of the Sea for Newfoundland and Labrador Studies, Jon Lien—once a member of giant squid expert Frederick Aldrich's "squid squad"—wrote that the former "thoroughly covers our knowledge of this exciting creature" and "is enjoyable and informative but I found it a bit less interesting than [Monsters of the Sea]". He was also of the view that "Ellis is hard on Aldrich's efforts to study [the giant squid] and on his speculations regarding its biology".

=== Later appraisal ===
Writing for Atlas Obscura in 2018, Eric Grundhauser opined that despite developments in the field since its publication, the book "is still the best read on the subject" and that "for anyone looking for a thorough primer on these mysterious creatures, this 1998 book remains essential".

== Release details ==
Paperback edition by Penguin Books. The background is taken from an illustration by Glen Loates and depicts an encounter between a giant squid and a sperm whale.

The book has been published in hardback and paperback formats and translated into German and Italian.

=== Hardcover ===
- Ellis, R. (September 1, 1998). The Search for the Giant Squid [: The world's most mysterious and elusive creature—its biology and mythology]. Lyons Press, New York City. ix + 322 pp. ISBN 978-1-55821-689-1. OCLC 38295200, 245720219, 859050550, 1059196483
- Ellis, R. (1999). The Search for the Giant Squid [: An authoritative look at the biology and mythology of the world's most elusive sea creature]. Robert Hale, London. ix + 322 pp. ISBN 978-0-7090-6433-6. OCLC 60210930

OCLC also records an electronic reproduction of the first edition by the HathiTrust Digital Library (OCLC 679332744) and an "Advance uncorrected proof" (OCLC 48227953) with different pagination (ix + 301 pp.).

=== Paperback ===
- Ellis, R. (October 1, 1999). The Search for the Giant Squid [: The biology and mythology of the world's most elusive sea creature]. Penguin Books, New York City. ix + 322 pp. ISBN 978-0-14-028676-2. OCLC 42640853, 411958047, 988805779, 1004327595

=== Translations ===
- Ellis, R. (June 1, 1999). Il Calamaro Gigante. [translated by Maria Teresa Marenco] Edizioni Piemme, Casale Monferrato. 315 pp. ISBN 9788838443794. OCLC 797330971, 1055415884 (in Italian)
- Ellis, R. (2002). Riesenkraken der Tiefsee [: Die aufregende Suche nach den letzten unbekannten Wesen unserer Welt]. [translated by Kurt Beginnen] Heel Verlag, Königswinter. 254 pp. ISBN 978-3-89365-876-3. OCLC 76386261, 488666767 (in German)
