= Discoteuthis laciniosa =

Conservation status
- Least Concern (IUCN 3.1)

Scientific classification
- Kingdom: Animalia
- Phylum: Mollusca
- Class: Cephalopoda
- Order: Oegopsida
- Family: Cycloteuthidae
- Genus: Discoteuthis
- Species: D. laciniosa

Binomial name
- Discoteuthis laciniosa Young & Roper, 1969

Species of squid

Discoteuthis laciniosa is a species of squid in the family Cycloteuthidae. The species occurs throughout the Atlantic, Indian and Pacific Oceans.
