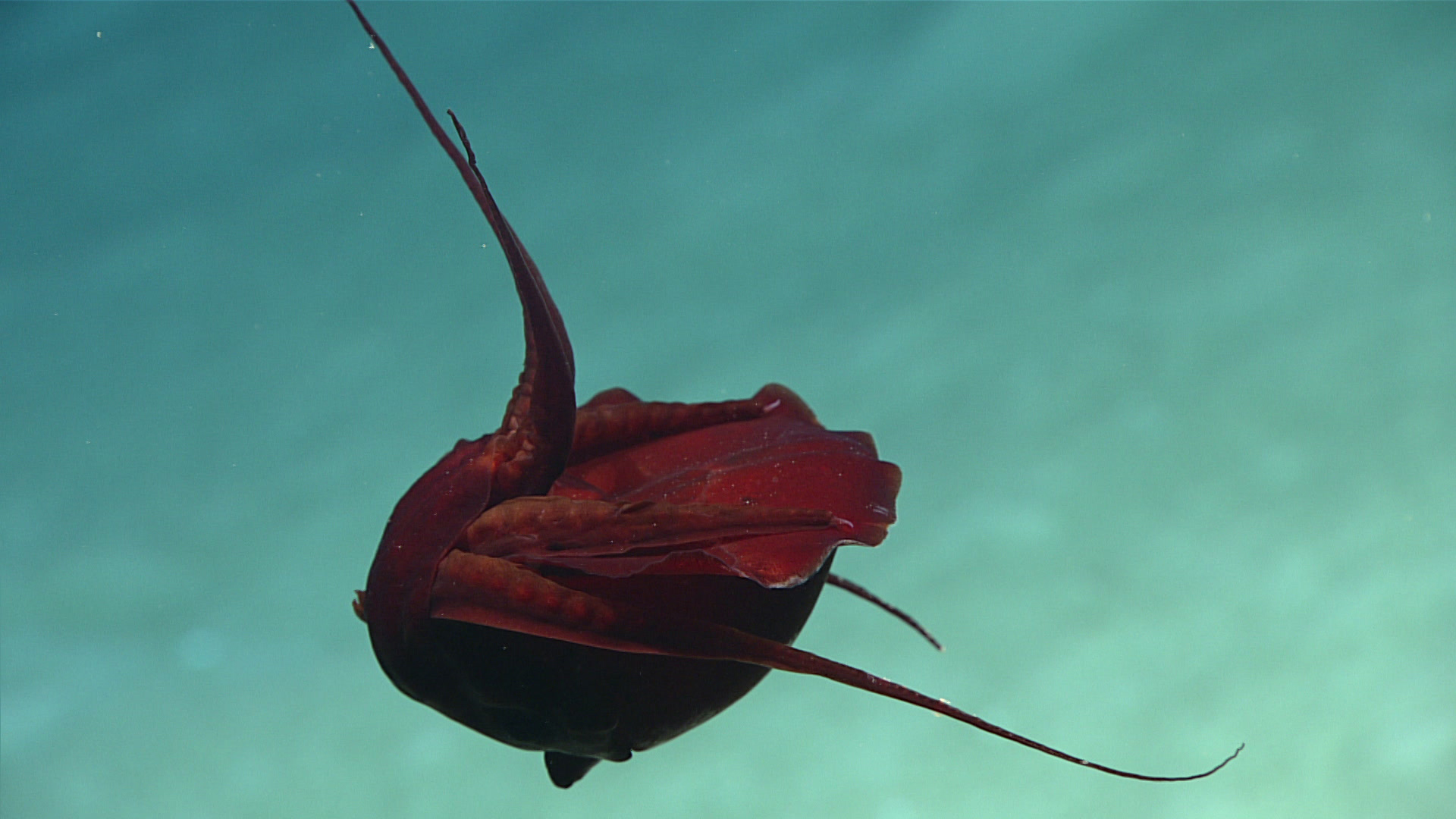
- cf. Discoteuthis discus

Conservation status
- Least Concern (IUCN 3.1)

Scientific classification
- Kingdom: Animalia
- Phylum: Mollusca
- Class: Cephalopoda
- Order: Oegopsida
- Family: Cycloteuthidae
- Genus: Discoteuthis
- Species: D. discus

Binomial name
- Discoteuthis discus Young & Roper, 1969

= Discoteuthis discus =

Species of squid

Discoteuthis discus, the rounded disc-fin squid is a species of squid in the family Cycloteuthidae. They occur in the tropical and subtropical Atlantic Ocean and the central North Pacific. While mature specimens have not been found, the unnamed species Discoteuthis sp. A has been hypothesised as the mature form.
