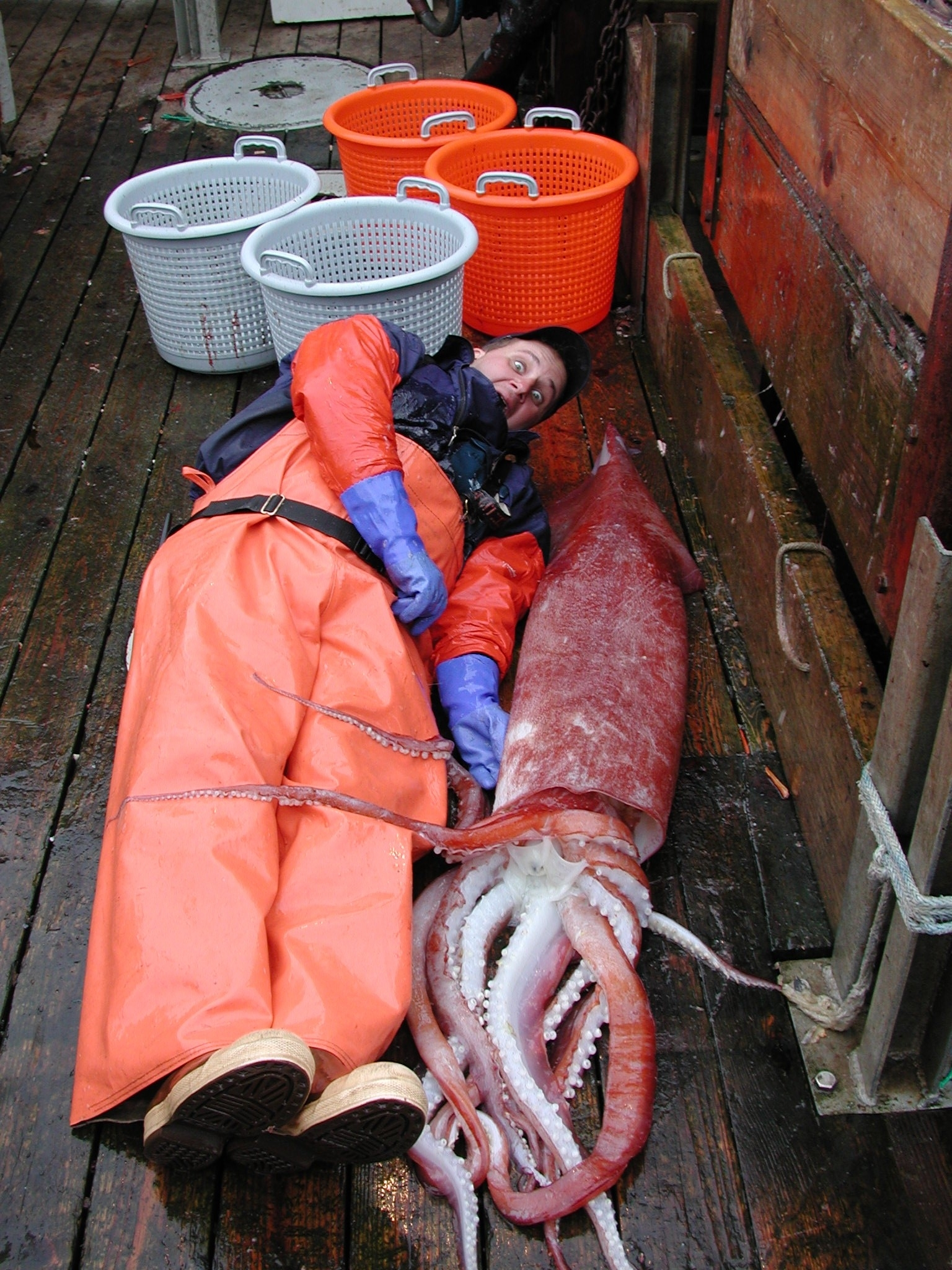
- An O. robusta specimen next to a human for scale (the specimen in image is a smaller individual)

Conservation status
- Data Deficient (IUCN 3.1) Downloaded on 16 March 2018.

Scientific classification
- Kingdom: Animalia
- Phylum: Mollusca
- Class: Cephalopoda
- Order: Oegopsida
- Family: Onychoteuthidae
- Genus: Onykia
- Species: O. robusta

Binomial name
- Onykia robusta (Verrill, 1876)

Synonyms
- Moroteuthis robustus (Verrill, 1876); Moroteuthis robusta (Verrill, 1876); Ommastrephes robusta Verrill, 1876; Lestoteuthis robusta Verrill, 1880; Ancistroteuthis robusta Steenstrup, 1882; Moroteuthis japonica Taki, 1964; Moroteuthis pacifica Okutani, 1983

= Onykia robusta =

Robust clubhook squid

Species of cephalopod known as the robust clubhook squid

Onykia robusta, also known as the robust clubhook squid and often cited by the older name Moroteuthis robusta, is a species of squid in the family Onychoteuthidae. Reaching a mantle length of 2 m (6.6 ft) it is the largest member of its family and one of the largest of all cephalopods. The largest specimen with reliable catch data was found in the Bering Sea, a male with a total length of 3.72 m (12.2 ft) and weighing 41.73 kg (92.0 lb). The tentacular clubs are slender, containing 15–18 club hooks. Arms of the species contain 50–60 suckers, and grow to 90–100% of the mantle length. It is found primarily in the boreal to Temperate Northern Pacific.

== Size ==
O. robusta can reach up to 2 m (6.6 ft) in mantle length. Nesis gave a maximum mantle length of 2.3 m (7.5 ft), however Roper and Jereb wrote that "this might be in error"; it commonly grows up to 1.6 m (5.2 ft) in mantle length. If the tentacles are measured from the tip to the tip of the mantle, Glaubrecht, M. & M. A. Salcedo-Vargas provided the maximum estimated to be 4–6 m (13–20 ft) in overall length. This species weight is up to 50 kg (110 lb).

== Genetic diversity ==
O. robusta has a low genetic diversity, similar to the giant squid Architeuthis dux.

== Confusion with Architeuthis ==
Kubota's photograph of a large O. robusta, which was misidentified as the giant squid, Architeuthis dux

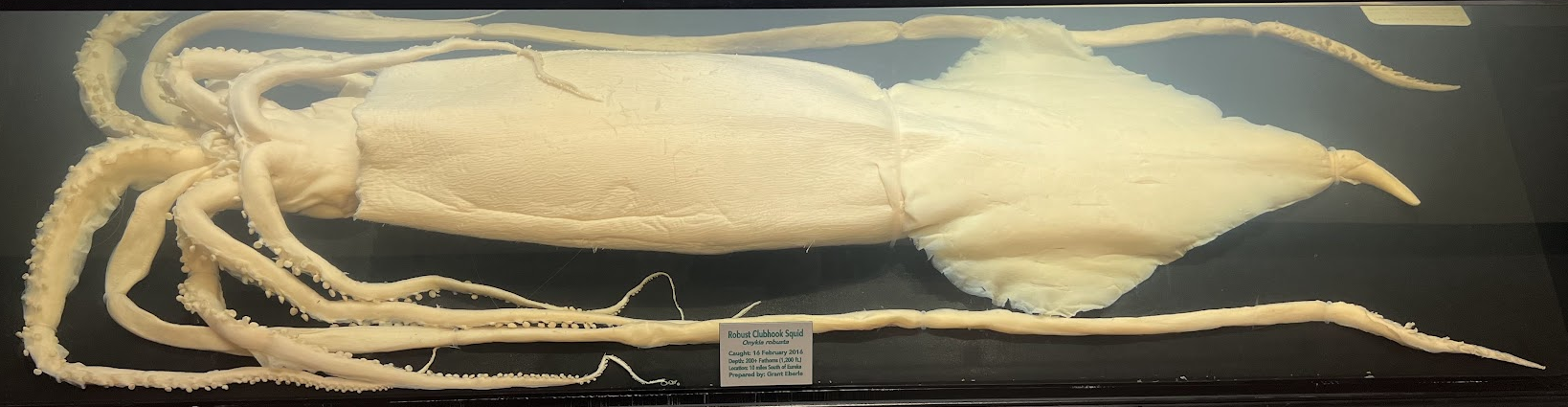
Preserved specimen caught near Eureka, California

Some time before 1993, a large individual of O. robusta was photographed by Japanese diver Kubota H. in shallow water off southern Japan. In this image, the animal, which appears to be sick or dying, is shown with a diver, although the use of a wide-angle lens exaggerates its size. A video of the same squid appears in a Japanese made-for-television film. The image was published in the 1993 book European Seashells by Guido T. Poppe and Goto Yoshihiro, where it was identified as Architeuthis dux, the giant squid, and said to have been taken in the North Atlantic. If true, this image would represent the earliest known photograph of a live giant squid.

In The Search for the Giant Squid (1998), Richard Ellis wrote of this photograph:

"For a moment, I thought that some obscure photograph had captured the most elusive image in natural history. Fortunately for those who have devoted their lives to searching for Architeuthis, this was only an aberration, a case of mistaken identity."

More than a decade later, the first photographs of a true live giant squid in the wild were taken, on September 30, 2004.

== See also ==
- Cephalopod size
