= Teuthology =

Study of cephalopods

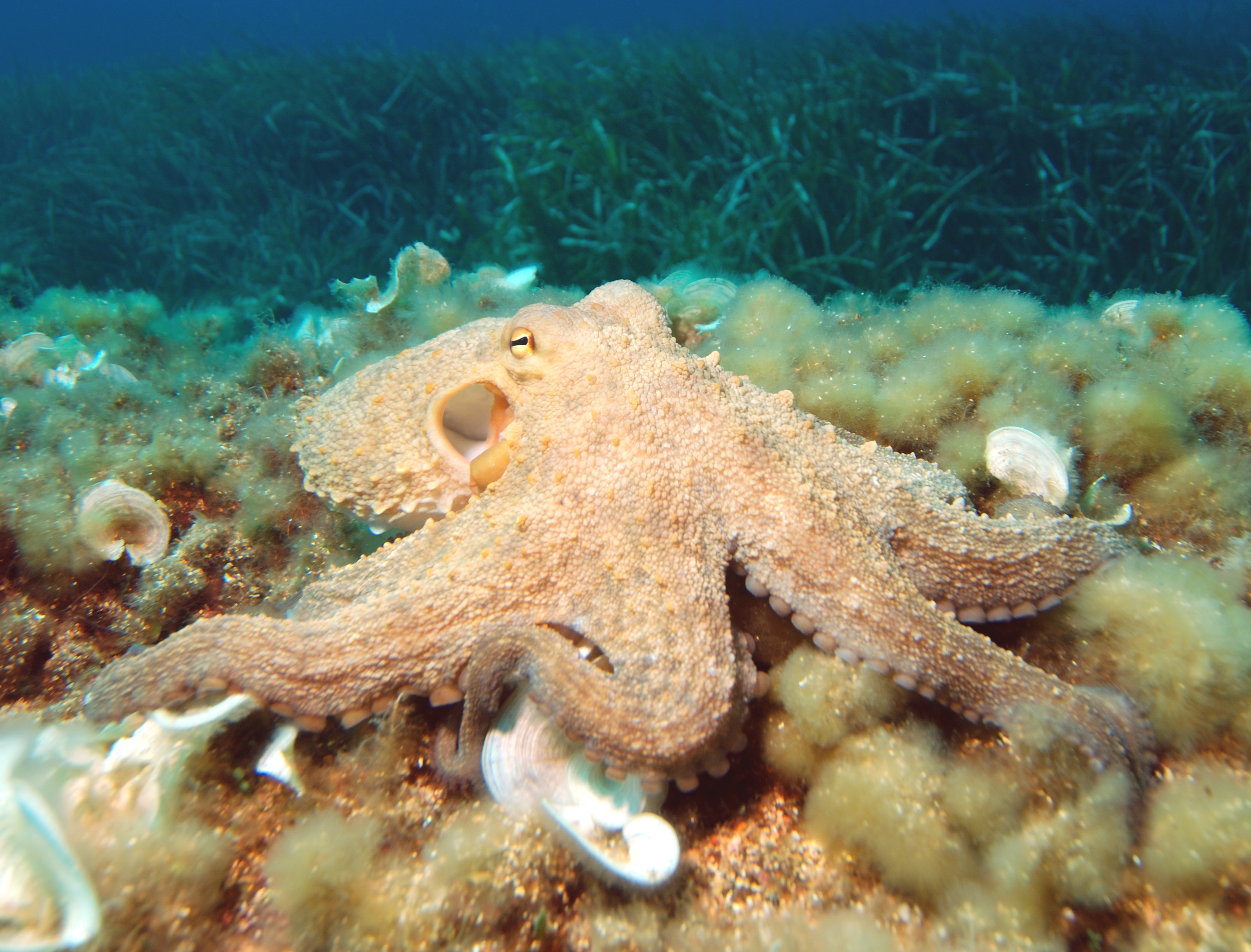
A common octopus (Octopus vulgaris)

Caribbean reef squid Sepioteuthis sepioidea on Bari Reef, Bonaire, BES Islands

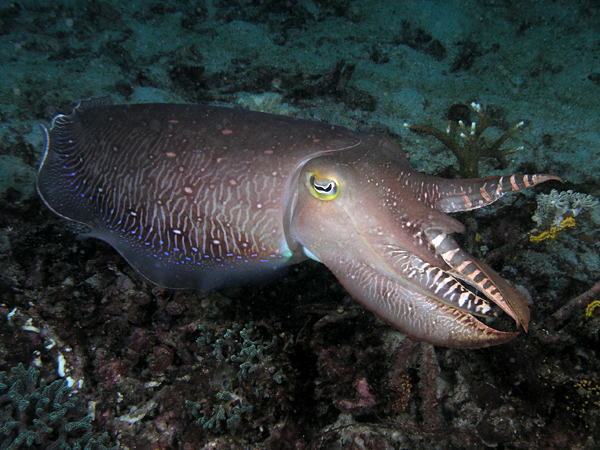
Large cuttlefish Sepia sp. from Komodo National Park

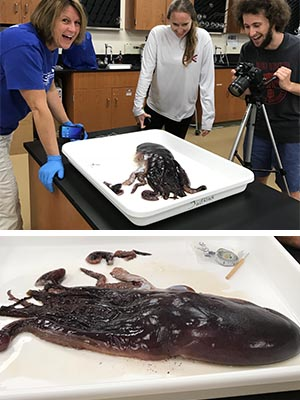
Researching teuthologist, Heather Judkins is a faculty member at University of South Florida (USF). This image is from the USF website, specifically her research lab's website.

Teuthology, from Ancient Greek τευθίς (teuthís), meaning "squid", and λόγος (lógos), meaning "study", is the study of cephalopods, which are members of the class Cephalopoda in the phylum Mollusca. Some common examples of cephalopods are octopus, squid, and cuttlefish. Teuthology is a large area of study that covers cephalopod life cycles, reproduction, evolution, anatomy, and taxonomy.

Teuthology is a specific branch of malacology, the study of molluscs. A teuthologist is a scientist who studies teuthology.

== Organizations ==
One of the main groups existing today to promote the study of Cephalopods is the Cephalopod International Advisory Council (CIAC), a group originally proposed by teuthologist Malcolm Clarke in 1981, and formally created in 1983, to influence the direction of cephalopod research and provide advice on all aspects of their biology, including to inform the management of fisheries.

Founding members of CIAC include many notable teuthologists (cephalopod researchers) including Malcolm Clarke, Gilbert and Nancy Voss, Eric Hochberg, Clyde Roper, Richard Young, Angel Guerra, C.C. Lu and others. CIAC holds triennial meetings to discuss recent advances in Cephalopod Research.

== See also ==
- Cephalopods topics
- Marine biology
- Teuthology topics
