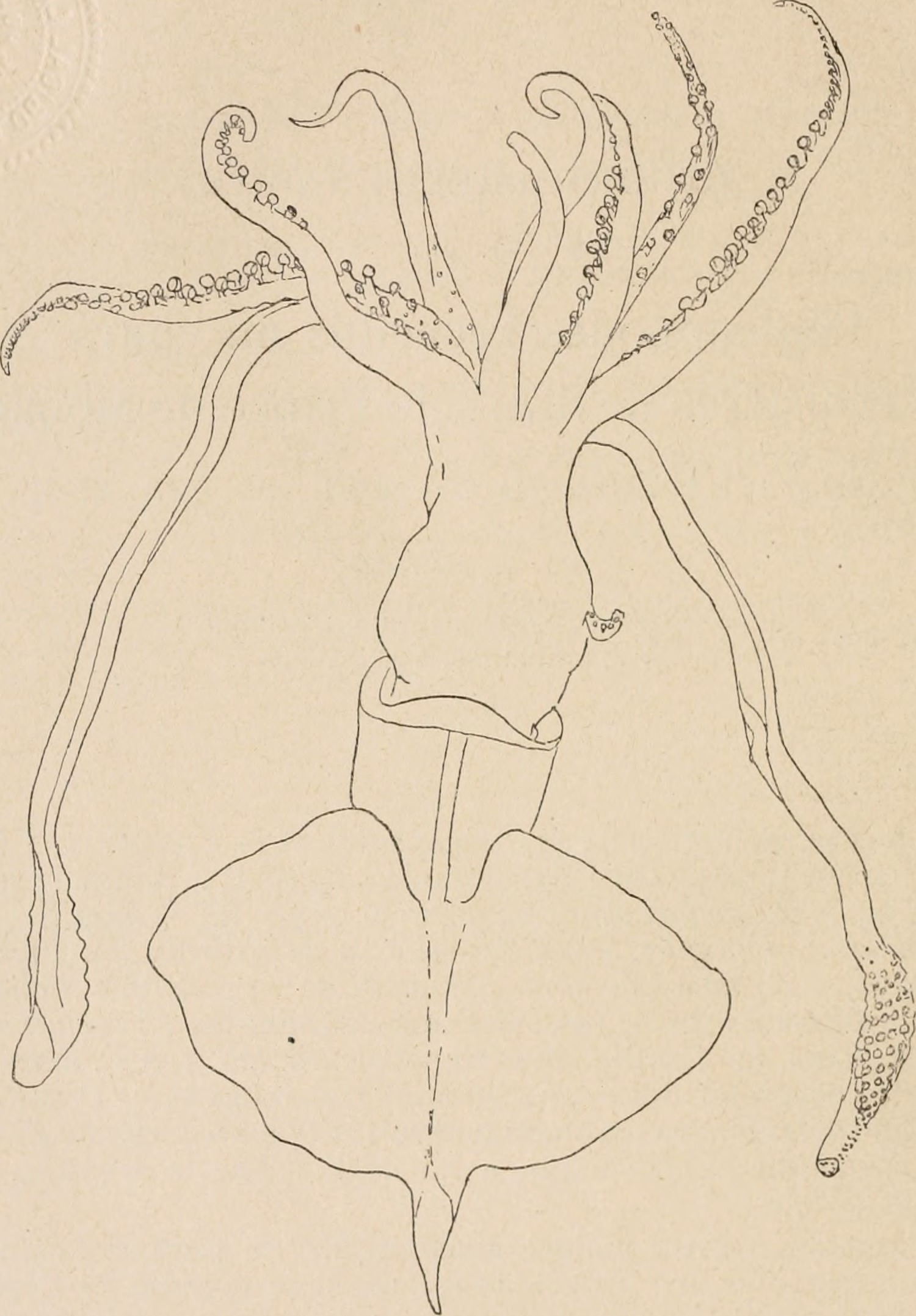

Conservation status
- Least Concern (IUCN 3.1)

Scientific classification
- Kingdom: Animalia
- Phylum: Mollusca
- Class: Cephalopoda
- Order: Oegopsida
- Family: Cycloteuthidae
- Genus: Cycloteuthis
- Species: C. sirventi

Binomial name
- Cycloteuthis sirventi Joubin, 1919

= Cycloteuthis sirventi =

Species of squid

Cycloteuthis sirventi, commonly known as Sirvent's disc-fin squid, is a species of squid in the family Cycloteuthidae, of which it is the most common. It is possible that C. akimushkini is a junior synonym of C. sirventi. The species occurs in the tropical to polar western Atlantic Ocean. It has a maximum mantle length of 500mm.

== Description ==
As described by Joubin, C. sirventi is a relatively small squid. Its mantle is conical shaped, and tapers towards a sharp point. The mantle wall is thin, with gelatinous connective tissue between an inner and outer wall of muscle. The fins are long and elliptical shaped, taking up about 80% of the overall mantle length. The lengths of the arms are about 85% of the mantle length, according to the largest specimens. The tentacles are long and robust, their clubs bearing four rows of suckers.

C. sirventi larvae are elongated, with small terminal fins. The photophores are not present in the eyes, which protrude greatly.

== History ==
Until lately, this species was only known from one specimen taken in 1912.

In 1919, Louis Joubin described a new genus and the species, C. sirventi, and stated that it was closely related to Lycoteuthis diadema, a synonym of Lycoteuthis lorigera. He placed these two in a family called Parateuthidae. Later, in 1921, Thiele created the Parateuthis genus based on a larval Oegopsida captured in the Antarctic Ocean. However, this genus holds no connection to Joubin's Parateuthidae family.

Shortly after, Naef transferred Lycoteuthis to the Enoploteuthidae. Later he established a subfamily for Cycloteuthis, Cycloteuthinae.
