= Discoteuthis =

Scientific classification
- Domain: Eukaryota
- Kingdom: Animalia
- Phylum: Mollusca
- Class: Cephalopoda
- Order: Oegopsida
- Family: Cycloteuthidae
- Genus: Discoteuthis; Young & Roper, 1969

Type species
- Discoteuthis discus Young & Roper, 1969

Species
- Discoteuthis discus Young & Roper, 1969; Discoteuthis laciniosa Young & Roper, 1969; Discoteuthis sp. A; Discoteuthis sp. B

Genus of squids

Discoteuthis is a genus of squid in the family Cycloteuthidae. It is distinguished from the genus Cycloteuthis by the absence of a tail on the mantle. The genus occurs in tropical and subtropical oceans worldwide.

The genus contains bioluminescent species.
