= Crittercam =

Technology attached to an animal

Crittercam footage of a narwhal swimming upside-down under the ice within a group of conspecifics.

Footage of an American alligator swallowing prey it just captured.

Crittercam is a small package of instruments including a camera that can be attached to a wild animal to study its behavior in the wild. National Geographic's Crittercam is a research tool designed to be worn by wild animals. It combines video and audio recording with collection of environmental data such as depth, temperature, and acceleration. The live feeds help scientists experience an animal's daily routines. Crittercam was invented by National Geographic marine biologist Greg Marshall in 1986. Since then it has been employed in studies on over 40 marine and terrestrial animals.

== History ==
The introduction of the terrestrial Crittercam made it possible for researchers to monitor the animals and their activity exactly when it occurred. Previously, the cameras could only record data and images for future playback once the camera was retrieved from the animal. When introduced in 2001 the camera was about half an inch in size. It had a resolution of 340 lines and is sensitive down to 3 lux. At this time it used a nine-volt battery for short term documentation of the animal's activities and a 1-pound battery to monitor for one week. The size of the battery continually increased as the duration of documentation did as well. Footage obtained from its use has appeared in program titles including "Great White Shark", "Sea Monsters", and "Tiger Shark". The first depth gauge was invented in the late 1800s. However, it wasn't until 1964 that the first depth recorder was actually placed on an animal, a Weddell seal in Antarctica. The next advancement in recording animal-borne imagery was made possible by a microprocessor that attached a video camera in a submersible case to a loggerhead turtle. This case came to be known as the Crittercam. Marshall first conceived his idea of the Crittercam on a diving trip in Belize. During one dive he encountered a shark with a sucker fish clinging to its body. He then realized that if a camera could be utilized to replace the sucker fish, researchers could explore the environment and behavior of sharks without having to dive deep. He immediately began work on this idea, receiving small grants from the American Museum of Natural History to support his funding. He later secured a grant from the National Geographic Society and began to develop highly improved prototypes of his initial device that was strapped to the loggerhead turtle. These prototypes were successfully utilized on sharks and sea turtles. Since its production the Crittercam has been used to study the underwater behaviors of green turtles, humpback whales, blue whales, monk seals, reef sharks, and many other marine animals.

== Attaching Crittercam ==
Methods for attaching the device vary with different species. In order to place it onto dolphins, whales and leatherback turtles special suction cups are used. Adhesive patches are used for seal and hardshell turtles. Sharks are fixed with a fin clamp in order for the device to remain in place while the animals are swimming. Backpack-like harnesses are placed on penguins for attachment. Land animals like lions and bears are given Crittercam collars. Research and development are constantly being conducted in hopes of devising more advanced attachment methods. Marshall has stated that he was surprised to see how quickly animals adapted to having the device strapped to their backs. While initial statements, from Greg Marshall, claimed the camera did not negatively affect or disturb animal's natural behaviors in their natural habitats, he did admit that 40- to 50-pound penguins' dives are decreased by 20 percent in distance while wearing the harness. When employed on emperor penguins, the camera proves its usefulness by capturing their behavior below the ice of Antarctica's waters where no human would be able to dive and manually record because of the freezing temperatures. In order to ensure the safety of the animals, in case something was to go wrong with the camera, scientists are able to remove the device through a remote control.

== Crittercam influence in media and popular culture ==
In 2011 the Mystic Aquarium & Institute for Exploration opened a traveling exhibit, funded by National Geographic, called "Crittercam: The World Through Animal Eyes". The periodical Insight on the News published an article stating that a team of scientists, led by Clyde Roper, wanted to use the Crittercam to film and study Architeuthis dux, the giant squid. It was stated in 2003 that the Crittercam had been attached to 41 tiger sharks, 3 dugongs, 3 whale sharks, and 34 turtles, all residing within Western Australia's Shark Bay and Ningaloo Reef. The camera can dive with sperm whales 200 meters deep and even remain intact within a pack of killer whales. A 13-part TV series premiered on National Geographic's cable channel on January 17, 2004, that showed actual footage received from animals equipped with the Crittercam.

== Kitty Cam ==
Inspired by the discoveries made as a result of the Crittercam on the behavior of various species, National Geographic and the University of Georgia have begun work on a new study that monitors the behavior of domestic cats called "Kitty Cam". Kitty Cams provide a creative solution to answer widespread and controversial questions about the interactions and behaviors of cats in the environment. Discoveries have been made from their collaborative efforts that identify common factors that threaten the health of owned free-roaming cats, such as exposure to infectious disease. The Kitty Cams are fixed on a collar that is placed on the cats, like Crittercams on land animals. The cameras are very lightweight and waterproof and can even capture activity at night through LED lights. In Athens-Clarke County, Georgia sixty cats were equipped with the cameras and monitored while roaming freely outdoors for 7–10 days. The experiment has been repeated many times and has produced many results from differing areas and seasons. After the initial experiment, 55 cats produced usable results with an average of 37 hours of footage per cat. In reference to their hunting behaviors, the footage showed that 44% of cats in Athens hunt wildlife. The majority of animals hunted were mammals, reptiles and invertebrates. They concluded that free-roaming cats showed hunting behavior during warmer seasons. Common risk factors concluded as a result of the study were crossing roads, coming into contact with other cats, eating/drinking substances outside of the house, exploring drain systems, and entering entrapping crawlspaces.

The smallest animal yet to carry Crittercam is the emperor penguin. Information and footage from Crittercam was used in the Oscar-winning documentary March of the Penguins.

At Museum of Science (Boston), there is an exhibit on Crittercam. The exhibit will soon travel to other museums. The exhibit allows people to participate in interactive displays and models.
