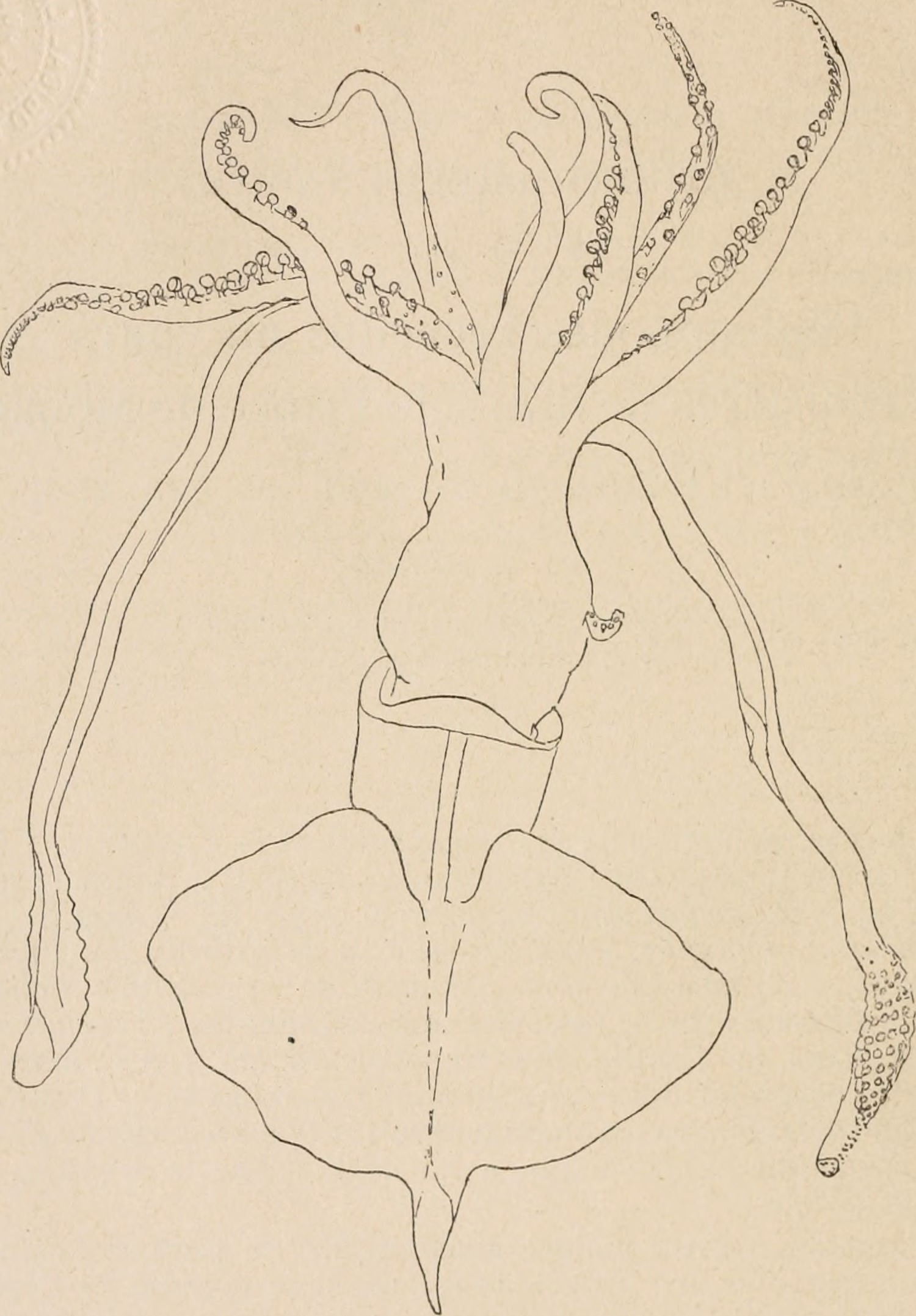
- Cycloteuthis sirventi

Scientific classification
- Kingdom: Animalia
- Phylum: Mollusca
- Class: Cephalopoda
- Order: Oegopsida
- Family: Cycloteuthidae
- Genus: Cycloteuthis; Joubin, 1919

Type species
- Cycloteuthis sirventi Joubin, 1919

Species
- Cycloteuthis akimushkini Filippova, 1968; Cycloteuthis sirventi Joubin, 1919

= Cycloteuthis =

Genus of squids

Cycloteuthis is a genus of squid in the family Cycloteuthidae. It is distinguished from the genus Discoteuthis by the presence of a tail on the mantle. The species C. akimushkini is currently considered a junior synonym of C. sirventi, however this is inconclusive and the World Register of Marine Species has C. akimushkini as a valid species.

The genus contains bioluminescent species.
