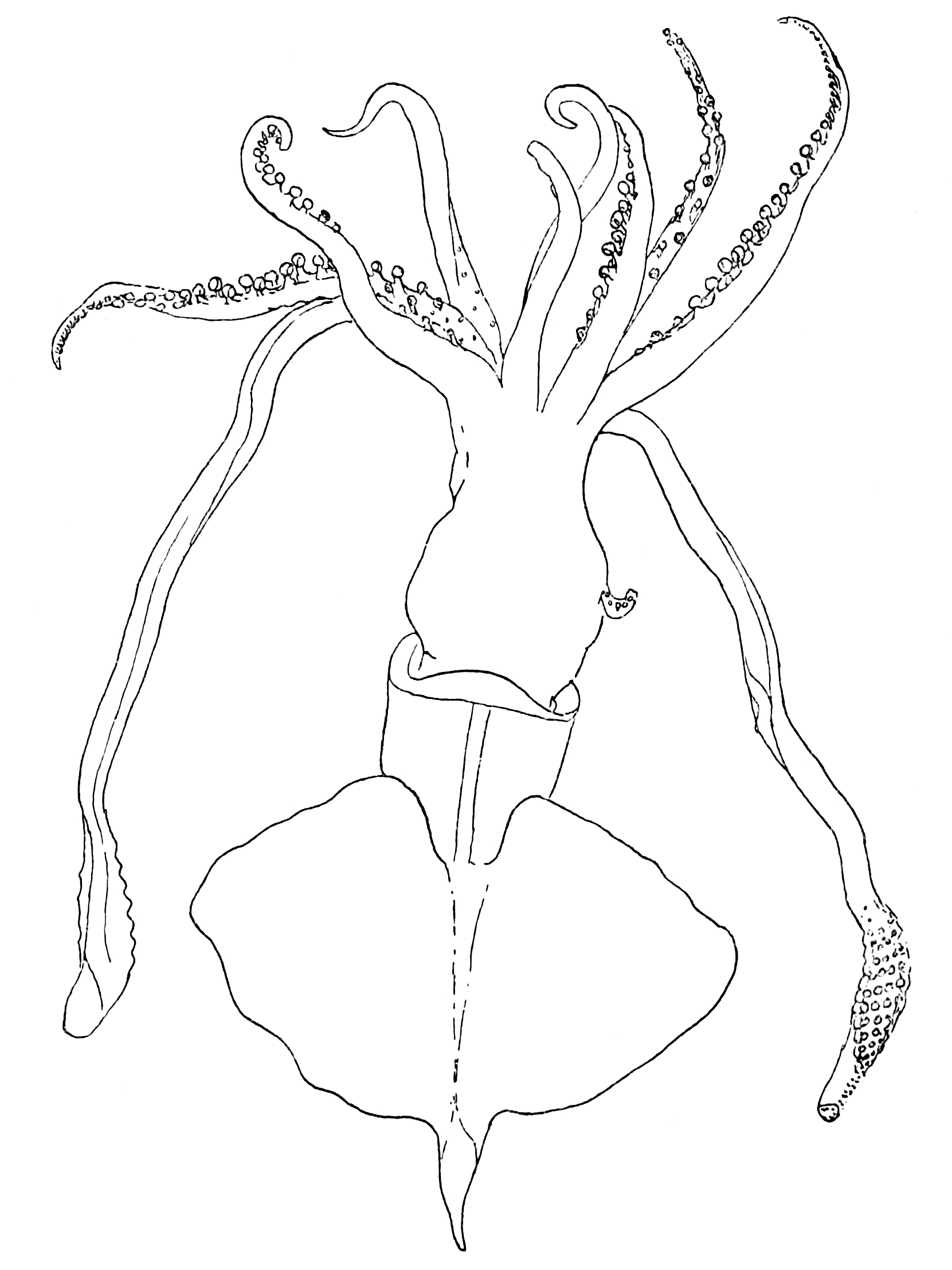
- Cycloteuthis sirventi

Scientific classification
- Kingdom: Animalia
- Phylum: Mollusca
- Class: Cephalopoda
- Order: Oegopsida
- Superfamily: Cycloteuthoidea
- Family: Cycloteuthidae; Naef, 1923

Type genus
- Cycloteuthis Joubin, 1919

Genera
- Cycloteuthis; Discoteuthis

= Cycloteuthidae =

Family of squids

The Cycloteuthidae are a family in the order Oegopsida, comprising two genera. While physically dissimilar, molecular evidence supports the relatedness of the genera. The family is found primarily in mesopelagic tropical to subtropical waters. Cycloteuthidae are characterised by a triangular funnel locking apparatus.

== Species ==
- Genus Cycloteuthis
  - Cycloteuthis akimushkini *
  - Cycloteuthis sirventi *
- Genus Discoteuthis
  - Discoteuthis discus *
  - Discoteuthis laciniosa
  - Discoteuthis sp. A *
  - Discoteuthis sp. B

The entries listed above with an asterisk (*) are questionable and need further study to determine if they are valid or synonyms.
