= Cephalopod attack =

Overview of attacks by cephalopods on humans

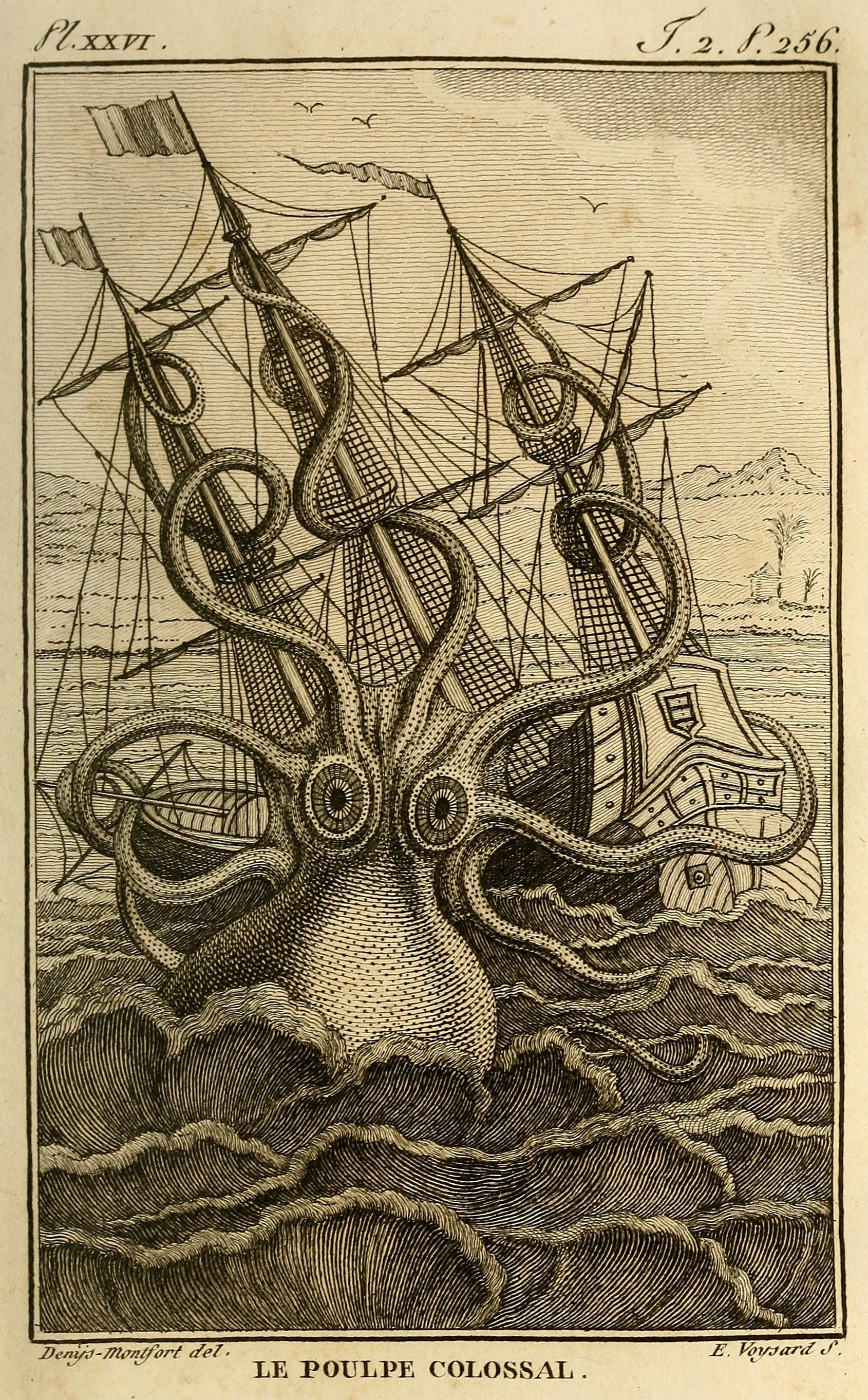
Giant octopus attacks ship for Pierre Denys de Montfort: Histoire Naturelle Générale et Particulière des Mollusques (1801)

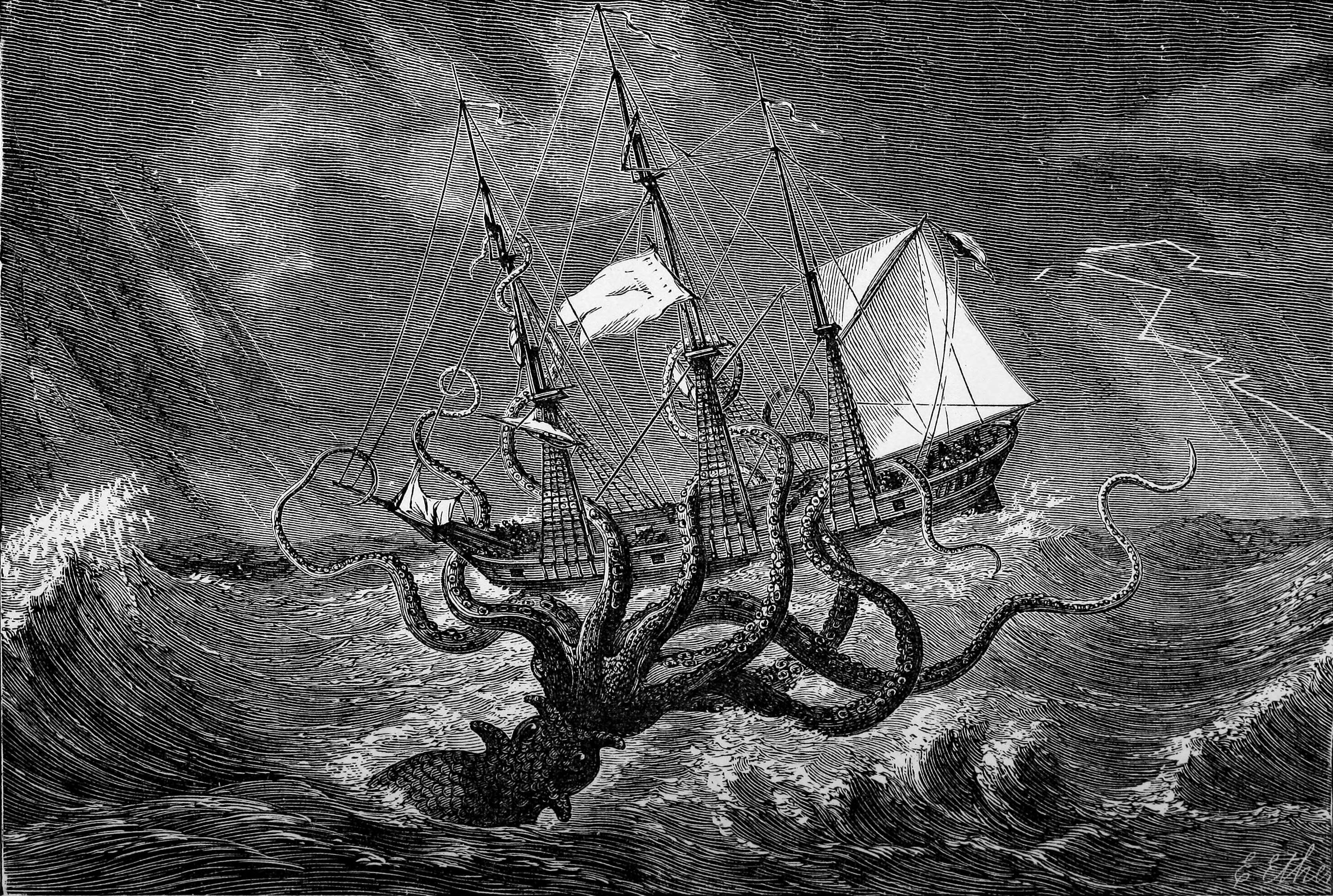
Giant octopus attacks ship for Edgar Etherington – J. Gibson: Monsters of the Sea: Legendary and Authentic (1887)

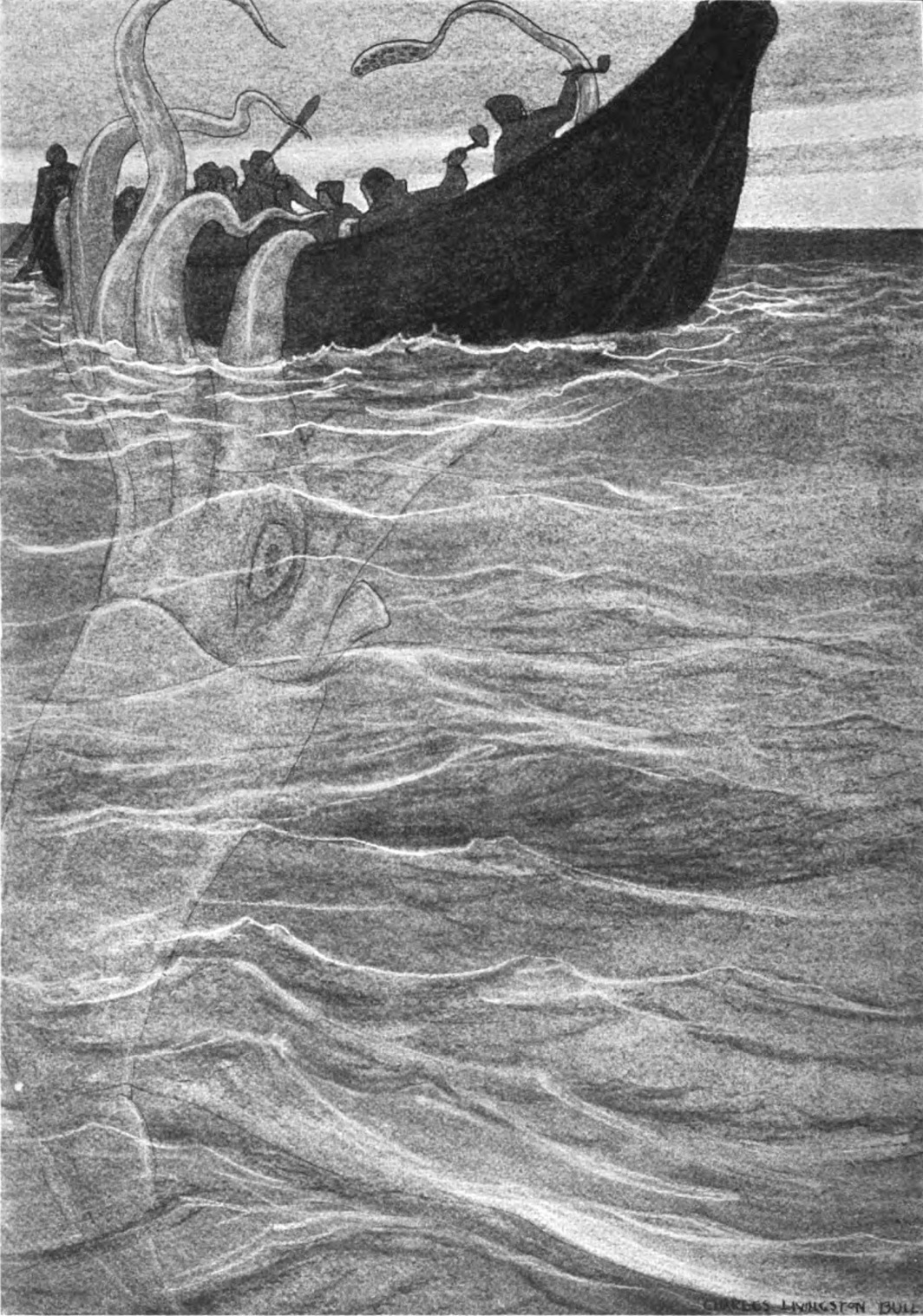
Giant squid attacks boat for Charles Livingston Bull: St. Nicholas: a monthly magazine for boys and girls (1920)

Cephalopod attacks on humans have been reported since ancient times. A significant portion of these attacks are questionable or unverifiable tabloid stories. Cephalopods are members of the class Cephalopoda, which includes all squid, octopuses, cuttlefish, and nautiluses. Some members of the group are capable of causing injury or death to humans.

== Defenses ==
=== Tentacles ===
Tentacles are the major limbs used by squid for defense and hunting. They are often confused with arms—octopuses have eight arms, while squids and cuttlefish have eight arms and two tentacles. These tentacles are generally longer than arms and typically have suckers only on their ends instead of along the entire length. The giant squid and colossal squid have some of the largest tentacles in the world, with suckers capable of producing suction forces of more than 800 kilopascals (roughly 100 pounds per square inch). Giant squids possess a serrated edge to their suckers, while colossal squid have developed it further into tentacle hooks; these hooks have been compared in size to the claws of a tiger.

=== Beak ===
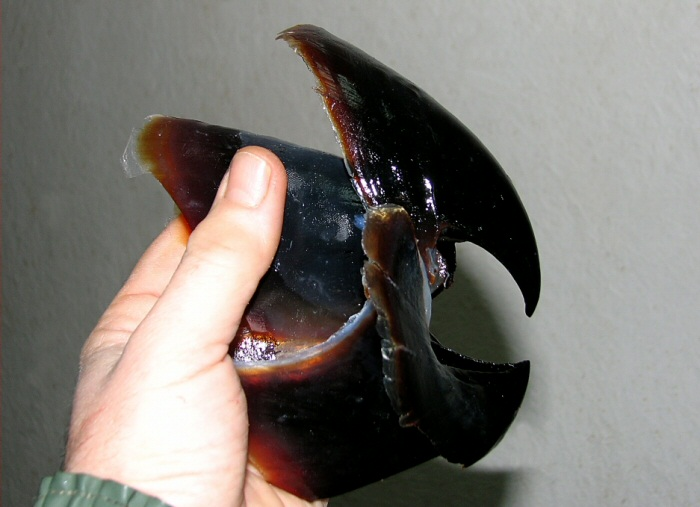
A colossal squid beak.

The cephalopod beak resembles that of a parrot. It is a tough structure made of chitin and marks the beginning of the cephalopod's digestive system. Colossal squid use their beaks for shearing and slicing their prey's flesh to allow the pieces to travel the narrow esophagus.

One of the largest beaks ever recorded was on a 495-kilogram (1,091 lb) colossal squid. The beak had a lower rostral length of 42.5 millimeters (1 11/16 in). Many beaks have also been discovered in the stomachs of sperm whales, as the stomach juices dissolve the soft flesh of the squid, leaving the hard beaks behind. The largest beak ever discovered in this way had a lower rostral length of 49 millimeters (1 15/16 in), indicating that the original squid was 600 to 700 kilograms (1,300 to 1,500 lb).

=== Venom ===
All octopuses have venom, but few are fatally dangerous. The greater blue-ringed octopus, however, is considered to be one of the most venomous animals known; the venom of one is enough to kill ten adult humans. It uses the neurotoxin tetrodotoxin, which quickly causes respiratory arrest. Estimates of the number of recorded fatalities caused by blue-ringed octopuses vary, ranging from seven to sixteen deaths; most scholars agree that there have been at least eleven.

== Attacks on humans ==
=== Octopus, including common and giant pacific octopus ===
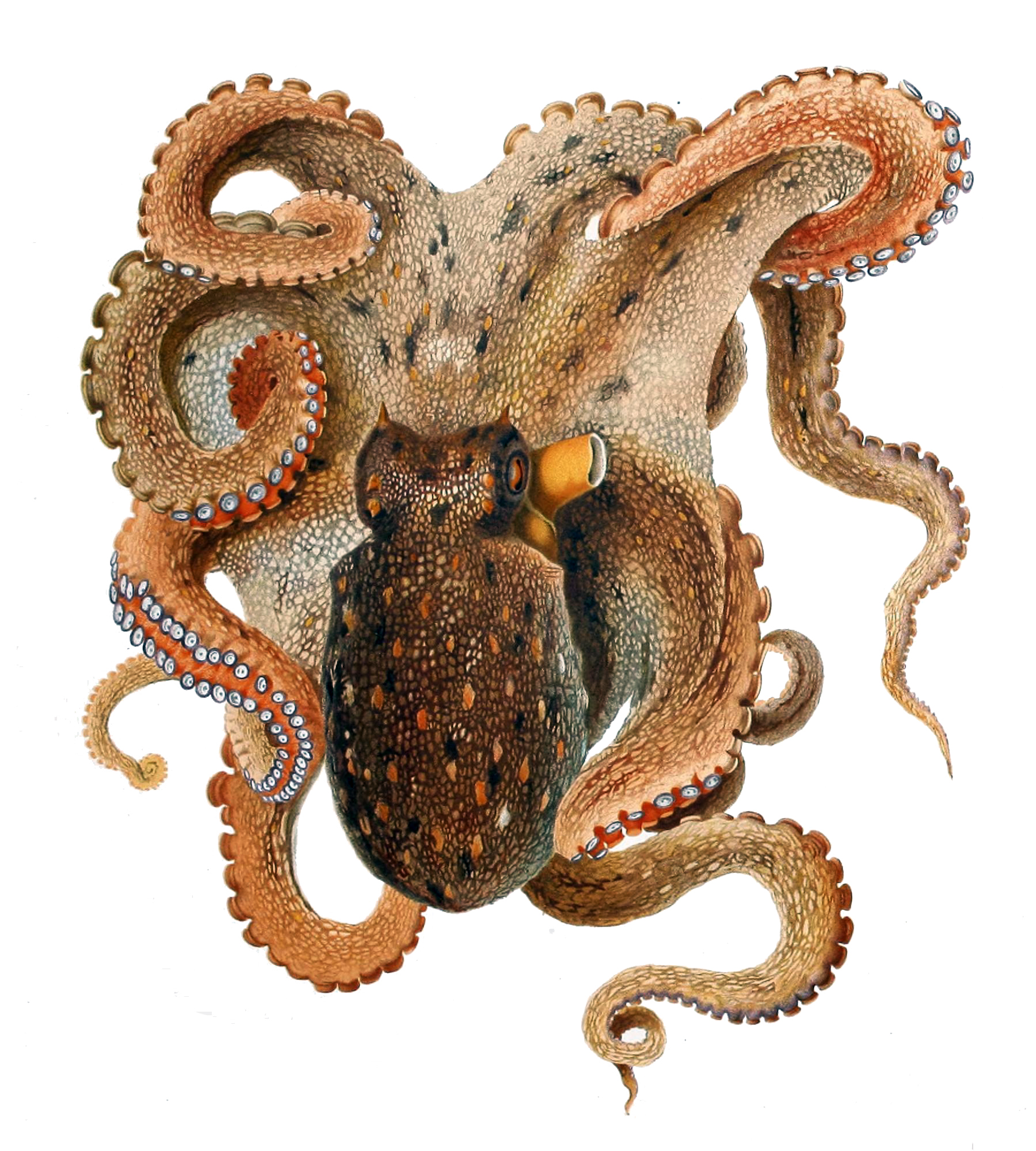
Common octopus

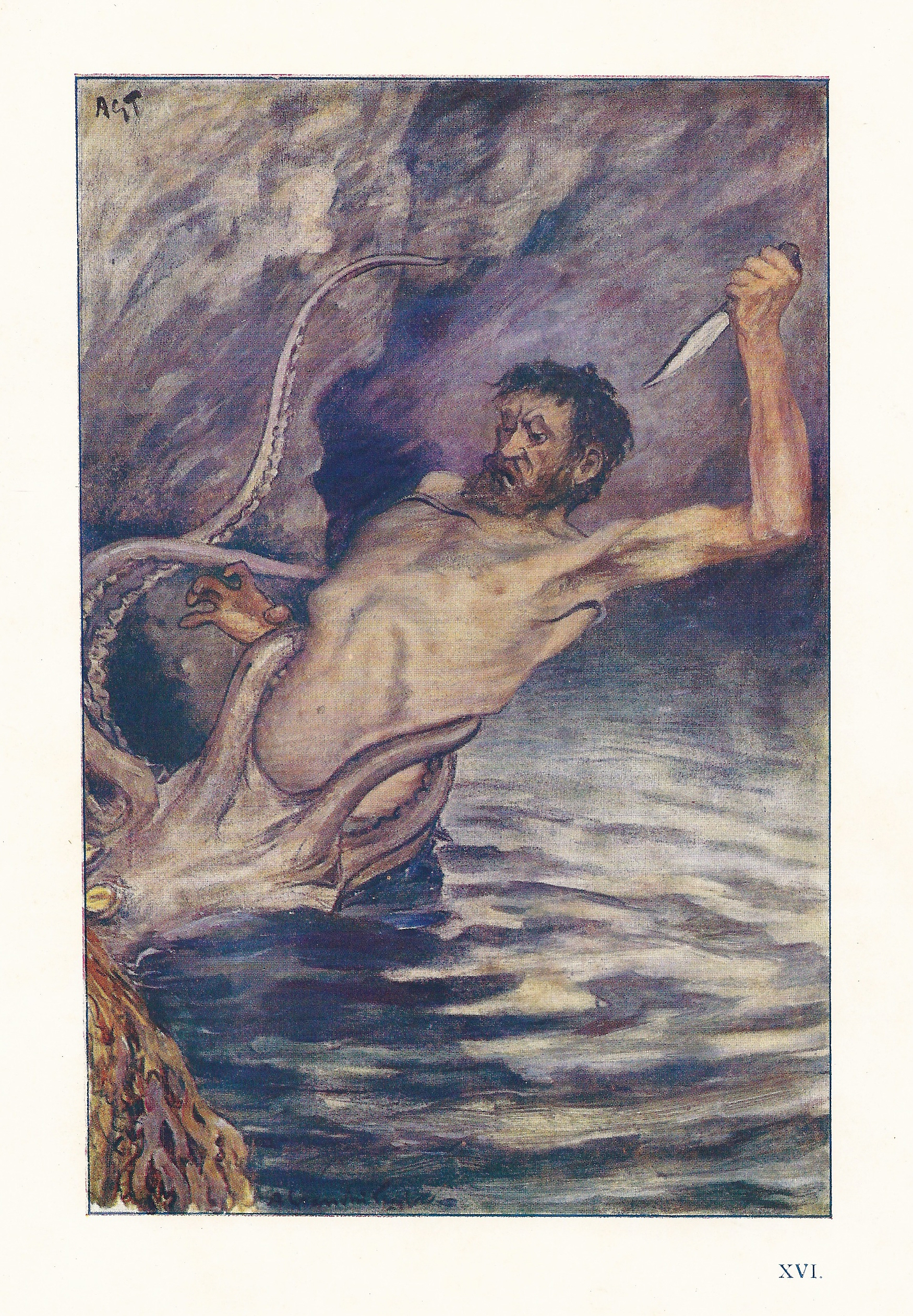
Illustration for the Toilers of the Sea (1921)

- Alfred Brehm (1829–1884) was one of the most significant naturalists of the 19th century. In the section on the giant squid in his famous book, Life of Animals, he mentions: "Most of the data on these giant octopuses can be found in Montfort’s book, The Natural History of Mollusks. There is talk of a sea monster grabbing the mast of a ship off the coast of Angola with its arms and almost pulling the ship down into the abyss, on the occasion of which the lucky crew painted this great danger in a vow in the chapel of St. Thomas of Malo. He further talks about another creature in the wake of Montfort, Captain Dens; it pulled some sailors off the ship's rack with his arms near St. Ilona; the end of one arm, which was stuck in the rigging of the ship and which had been cut off, proved to be 25 feet [7.5 m] long and had several rows of suction discs on it."
- American traveler Frederick O'Brien (1869–1932) reports during his research in the Marquesas Islands that a relative of one of the locals was killed by a large octopus living in the coastal countryside.
- An undetermined date (sometime in the early 20th century): A diver was attacked by a large octopus in the military port of Toulon. The diver reportedly lost consciousness and almost drowned, but the diver's companions were able to pull him out of the water and remove the octopus. It weighed about 60 kilograms (130 lb) and had legs 8 meters (26 ft) long. Other divers have also encountered giant octopuses attacking them: Witney at Maquari (Australia, 1912), John D. Craig at San Benito Island (1941), Charless Massenger (1930), A. C. Wheele at Washington (1936), during the filming of the film "Golden Boat" (1934). In 1934, a 13-year-old boy was attacked by a large octopus while swimming in the sea, allegedly at the Juan les Pins sea baths. According to other old accounts, it captured pearl fishermen in the South Seas.
- According to Pernetti (Voyage aux iles Malouines) off the coast of Angola, a huge 8-armed octopus climbed aboard. It was so severe that the ship capsized halfway. The rest of the story is unknown.
- In French writer Victor Hugo's novel Toilers of the Sea, an imaginary fight between the novel's main hero and an octopus takes place. Hugo also comments on the allegations of similar events: ″An engraving in Sonnini's edition of Buffon represents a Cephaloptera crushing a frigate. Denis Montfort, in fact, considers the Poulp, or Octopod, of high latitudes, strong enough to destroy a ship. Bory Saint Vincent doubts this; but he shows that in our regions they will attack men. Near Brecq-Hou, in Sark, they show a cave where a devil-fish a few years since seized and drowned a lobster-fisher. Peron and Lamarck are in error in their belief that the "poulp" having no fins cannot swim. He who writes these lines has seen with his own eyes, at Sark, in the cavern called the Boutiques, a pieuvre swimming and pursuing a bather. When captured and killed, this specimen was found to be four English feet broad, and it was possible to count its four hundred suckers. The monster thrust them out convulsively in the agony of death.″ (The monster part) Other sources confirm one of the stories. Author H. W. Lanier's book (1930s) about the adventures of fisherman Victor Berge also mentions giant octopus attacks on the islands of the South Seas. While octopuses generally avoid humans, attacks have occasionally been verified. For example, a 240-centimeter (8-foot) Pacific octopus, said to be nearly perfectly camouflaged, approached a diver and attempted to wrap itself around the diver and his camera. Another diver recorded the encounter on video. The divers speculated that the octopus may have thought its reflection in the camera lens was a smaller octopus, which may have motivated it to attack.

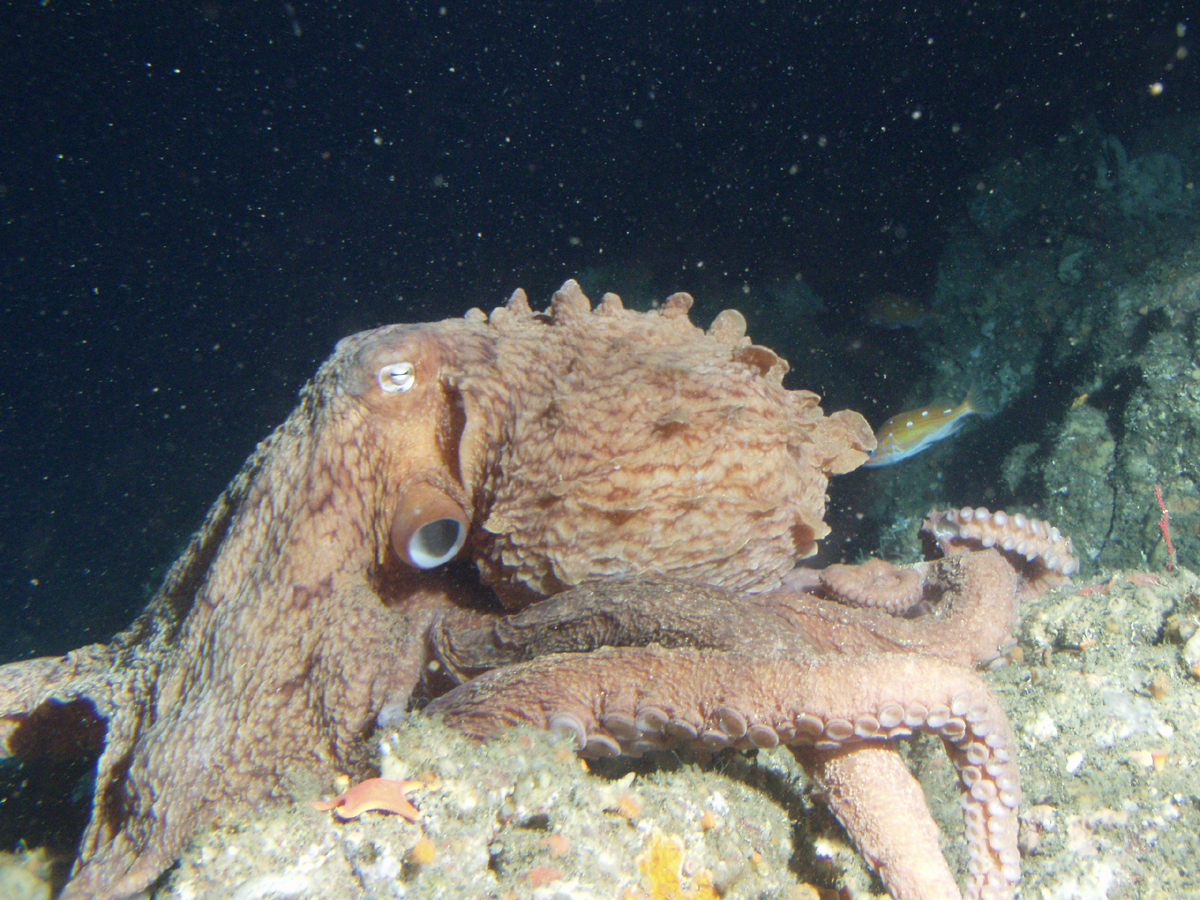
Giant Pacific octopus

The supposed attack on a Staten Island ferry in New York, leading to the loss of the ferry and commemorated by a bronze sculpture (installed in 2016), never actually occurred, nor was there any such ferry disaster. The artist responsible admitted it was "a multimedia art project and social experience – not maliciously – about how gullible people are".

In the 1960s, divers would willingly grapple octopuses in octopus wrestling, a then-popular sport in coastal United States.

- In another part of River Monsters, in "Terror in Paradise", Jeremy Wade reports that a fisherman has been attacked by a giant octopus on the North American coast of the Pacific Ocean.
- According to a 1958 news report, a few decades earlier, a man named Hook was attacked by a 10-meter giant octopus at a depth of 25 meters near Vancouver.

=== Giant or colossal squid ===
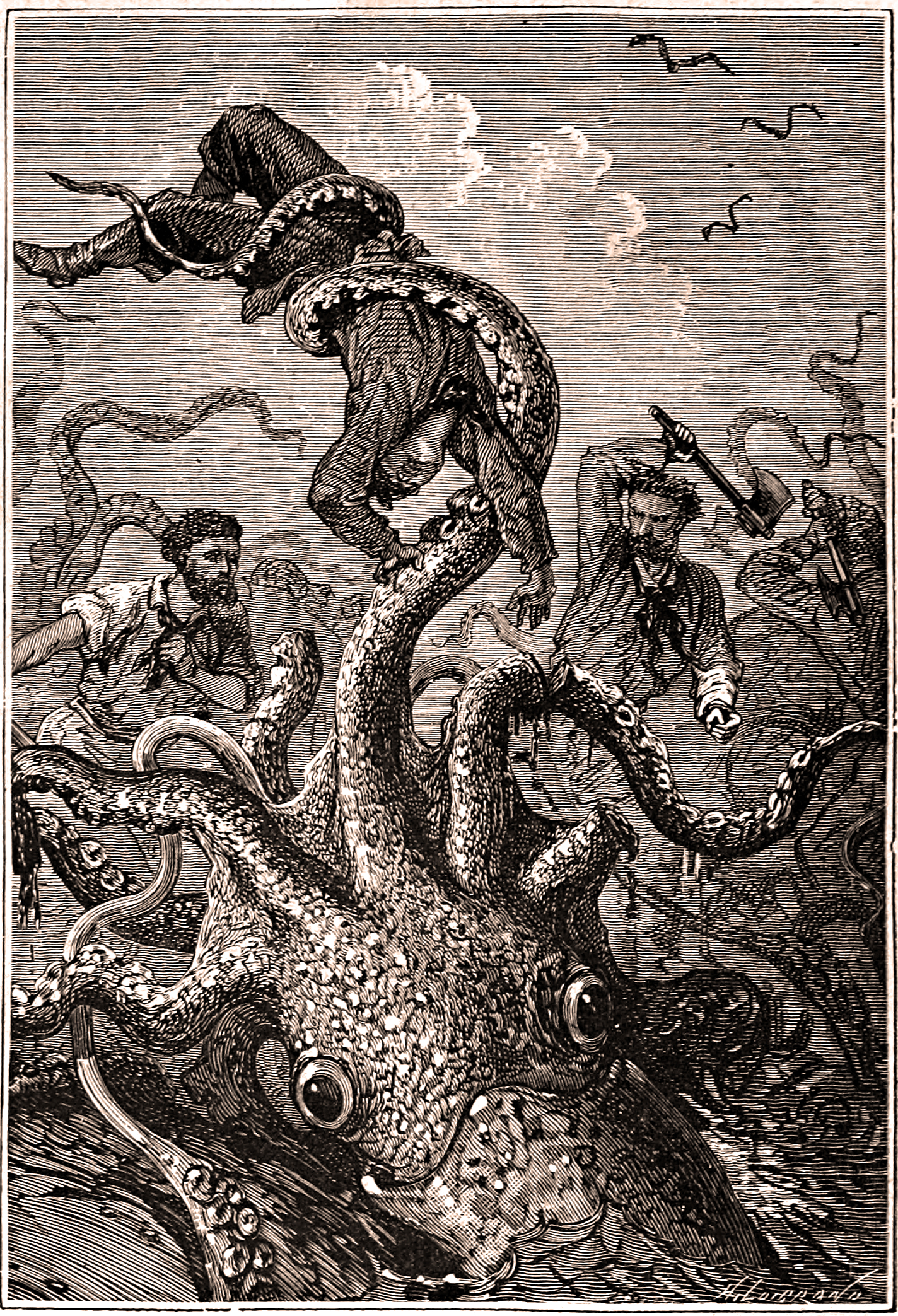
An illustration from the original edition of Twenty Thousand Leagues Under the Seas depicting a giant squid (1871)

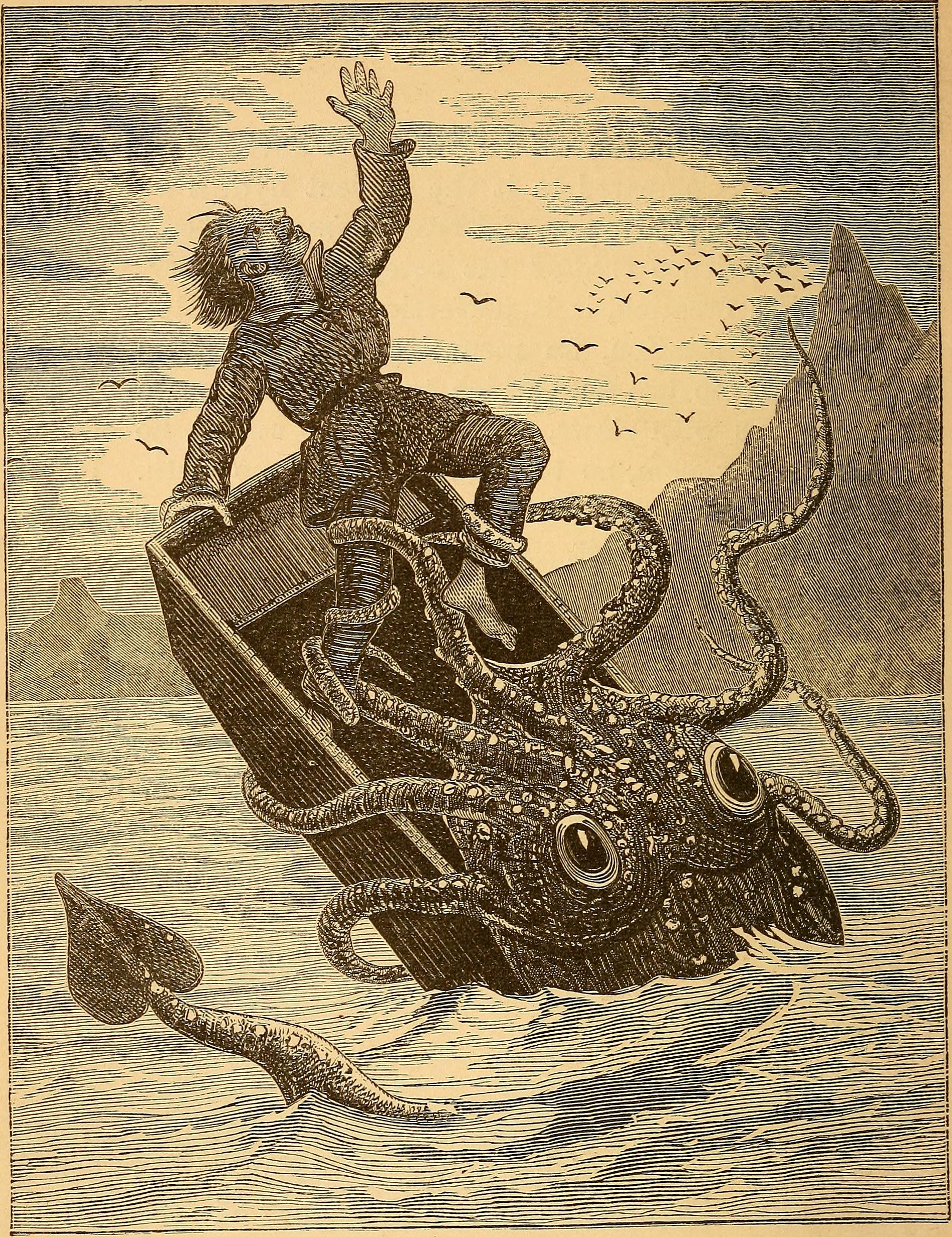
Illustration for Ocean wonders – a companion for the seaside (1879)

Illustration for Emilio Salgari: Duemila leghe sotto l'America (1888)

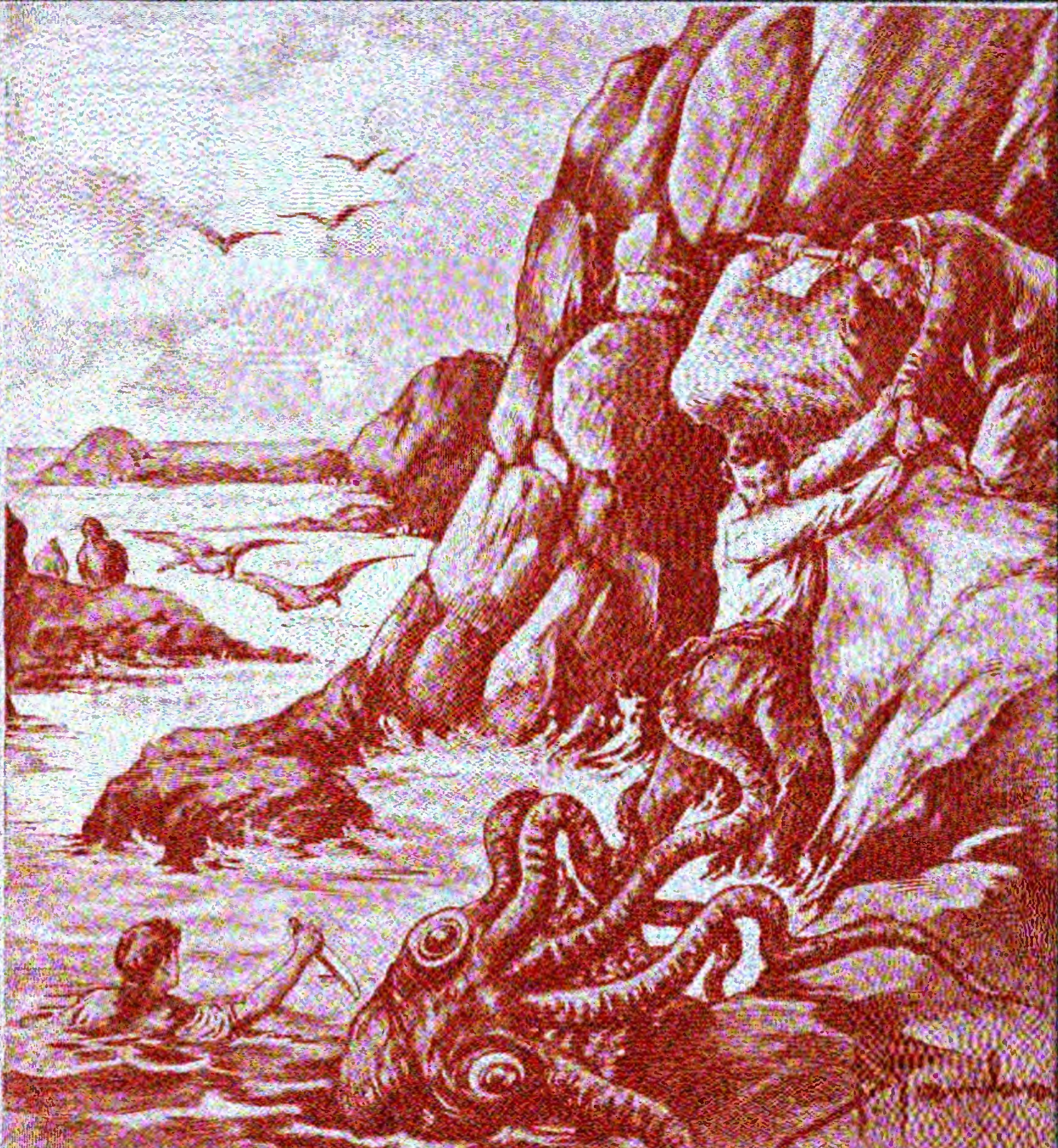
Illustration for Emilio Salgari: I Robinson Italiani (1897)

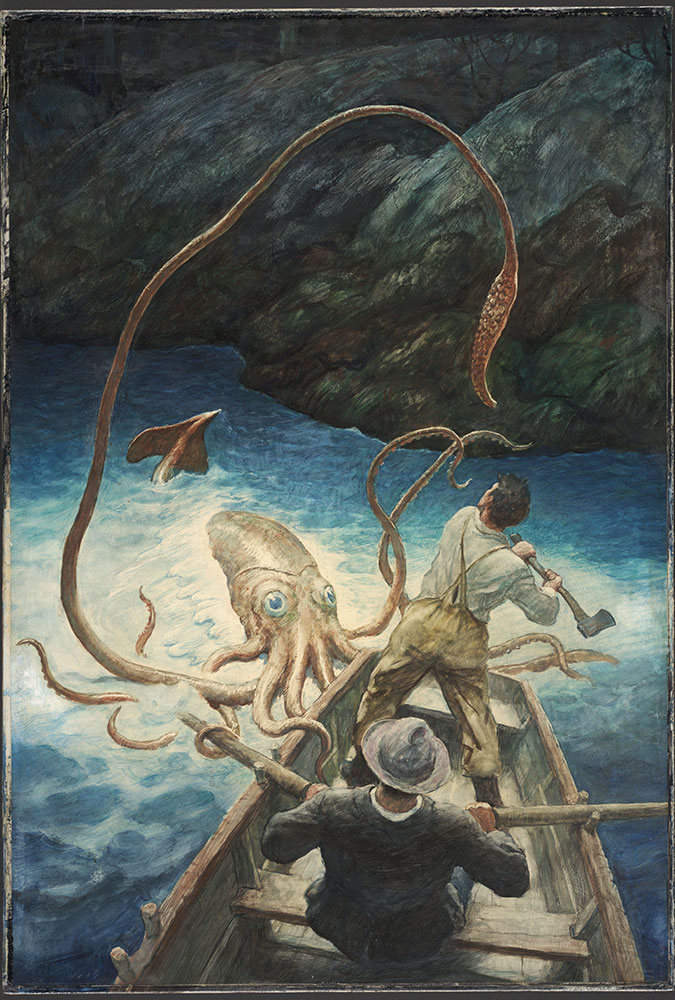
Illustration for Norman Duncan: The Adventures of Billy Topsail (c. 1939)

"The most common question that arises about giant squid is whether these huge animals attack humans or pose a threat to ships. We must answer this question in the affirmative, although certainly not in the case of large, modern cruise ships. There is no doubt, however, that a smaller ship or boat can occasionally be attacked by such a giant. The fact that there are few examples of this is obviously due to the fact that the giants do not come close to the surface. This is also our good fortune, because if it were not, it would certainly be a danger to boaters. Reliable witnesses report that the giant squid has attacked ships in recent times, even larger ships. The Architeuthids purportedly swam around the ship traveling at a speed of 40 km/h [25 mph] (this is an amazing speed for an aquatic animal; we have no idea what their maximum speed is) and launched an attack. We can assume that the hull of the ship could have been viewed as the body of a Patagonian Toothfish, as the places they tried to bite into were where the brains are located. How true this assumption is will be revealed one day. So we shouldn't always think of giant squid stories as tales, but we also have to take into account that they are mostly thoroughly colored."

— Dr. Wolfgang Crome et al., (1977)

- The French ship Ville de Paris participated in the American War of Independence. She sailed in the company of nine other ships when she may have been attacked by huge giant squids and dragged down into the deep. However, other sources claim the ship sank in a storm in 1782.
- Based on other sources, Hungarian traveler Dr. Endre Jékely tells several of the above stories: On 26 October 1873, 3 men were fishing in the Belle Isle (Newfoundland and Labrador). They were attacked by a huge giant squid, but one of the fishermen cut off one of the squid's arms. Based on this, the length of the animal was subsequently estimated at 14 meters (46 ft) on the shore.
- Sailors cleaning a ship near St. Ilona Island and Cape Nigra were attacked by a giant squid; two were pulled into the deep, and a third later died from injuries sustained during the attack. One of the squid's arms, severed during the attack, was 7.5 meters (25 ft) in length; the full arm was estimated to be 10 meters (33 ft). Based on this, the entire animal could have been much larger.
- In 1873, a fishing boat in Conception Bay, Newfoundland, was attacked by a giant squid. Numerous letters about the incident stated a severed tentacle was recovered.
- In 1874, a report appeared in an Indian newspaper stating that on 10 May of the current year, a ship called the Strathowen was leaving Colombo for Madras through the Bay of Bengal. In the distance, a small sailboat appeared, to which a huge crowd swam with whipping movements, and then climbed on it—it was a giant squid or giant octopus. The small ship soon capsized and then sank. The crew of the small boat got into the water, but they were picked up by the crew of the Strathowen. Its captain, James Flowyd, reported that the small ship was called Pearl, weighing 140 tonnes (150 short tons). They claim they themselves shot the squid floating in silence, which made him furious and climbed onto the ship. Two sailors died in the squid arms, and a third disappeared (perhaps drowned). Five people escaped the Pearl. The squid body was said to be at least as thick as the small ship, with arms thick as wood.
- In the 1930s, Norwegian tanker Brunswick reported having been attacked by a giant squid in the South Pacific between Hawaii and Samoa. The animal tried unsuccessfully to grip the ship with its tentacles before being killed by the propellers. The story was validated by Commander Arne Groenningsaeter of the Royal Norwegian Navy, stating that the ship had not one, but three encounters with giant squids between 1930 and 1933.
- A giant squid allegedly attacked a raft with survivors from the Britannia in 1941, which had been sunk in the South Atlantic. One of the men was dragged away by the squid, and another, Lieutenant Raymond Edmund Grimani Cox, managed to narrowly escape the same fate, though suffering tentacle sucker wounds. The chronicle of the survivors was first told in 1941 by the London Illustrated News, which stated that, according to the account given to them by Cox, a survivor first had his legs bitten off by a shark and then was devoured by a giant manta, but in 1956, Cox himself contacted writer Frank W. Lane to tell his story. They required marine naturalist John Cloudsley-Thompson to examine Cox's scars at Birkbeck College, and the former further validated the story, assuring the marks, of 1-1/4 inches in size, belonged to a 23-feet long squid. The story has been called the only substantiated report of a giant squid killing humans. However, other authors have called it into question, considering it an urban legend.
- In 1978, the USS Stein was apparently attacked by a giant squid. The ship's "NOFOUL" rubber coating was damaged with multiple cuts containing evidence of claws found in squid tentacles.
- In 1989, Philippine fishermen rescued 12 survivors clinging to an overturned boat. They allege that a giant octopus or a giant squid turned the boat upside down, but did not attack them afterwards, although a 12-week-old boy drowned.
- In 2003, the crew of a yacht competing to win the round-the-world Jules Verne Trophy reported being attacked by a giant squid several hours after departing from Brittany, France. The squid purportedly latched onto the ship and blocked the rudder with two tentacles. Olivier de Kersauson (captain of the yacht) then stopped the boat, causing the squid to lose interest. "We didn't have anything to scare off this beast, so I don't know what we would have done if it hadn't let go", Kersauson said.

=== Humboldt squid ===
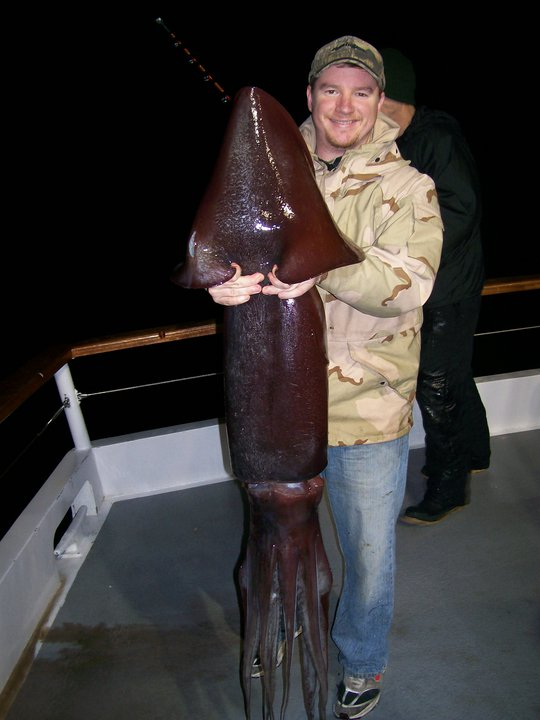
Humboldt squid

- Humboldt squid are notorious for their aggression. In Mexico, they are known as diablo rojo (Spanish for 'red devil'): Local fishermen's tales claim that people who fell into the waters were devoured within minutes by packs of squid. Wildlife filmmaker Scott Cassell made the documentary "Humboldt: The Man-eating Squid" for the Dangerous Waters series of the Discovery Channel.
- There is some disagreement on the veracity of Humboldt squid aggression. Some scientists claim the only reports of aggression toward humans have occurred when reflective diving gear or flashing lights have been present, acting as provocation. Roger Uzun, a veteran scuba diver and amateur underwater videographer, swam with a swarm of Humboldt squid for approximately 20 minutes, later saying they seemed more curious than aggressive. When not feeding or being hunted, Humboldt squid exhibit curious and intelligent behavior.
- Jeremy Wade deals with the Humboldt squid in his documentary River Monsters. Here, a California fisherman claims to have been attacked at a fish table one night as he tried to swim from one boat to another. In the same film, a Peruvian fisherman considers this animal to be life-threatening: If one gets between them, they will be dragged down into the deep.
- In another film by naturalist Steve Backshall, fishermen report, among other things, that a fisherman was caught in the abyss by a squid. Another fisherman was bitten by the squid on his skull, breaking it.

== Gallery ==
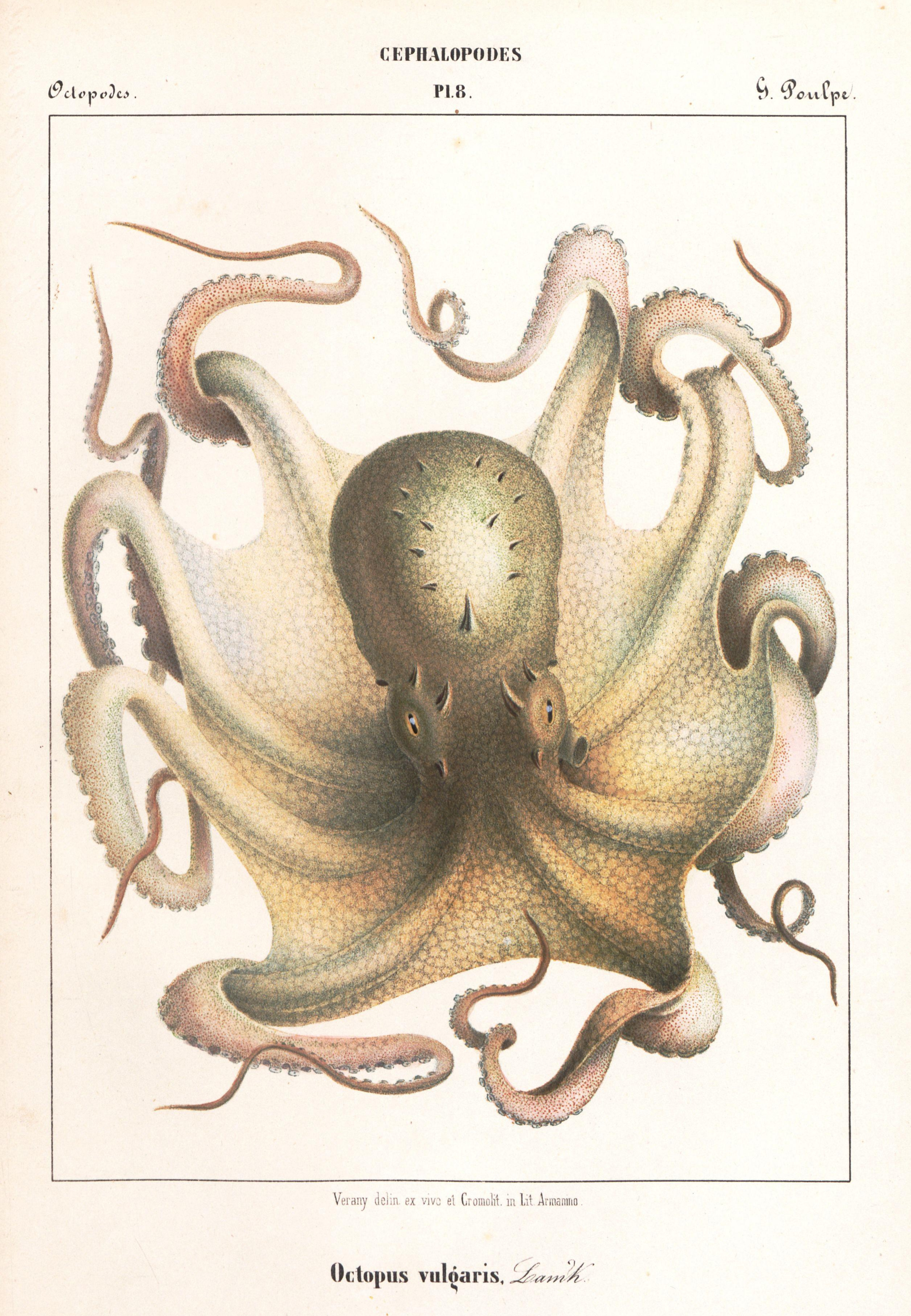
Common octopus (Octopus vulgaris, max. 1–2 m or 3.3–6.6 ft)

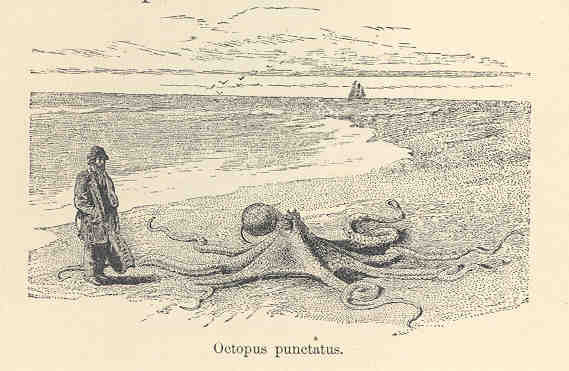
Giant Pacific octopus (Enteroctopus dofleini, max. 9 m or 30 ft)

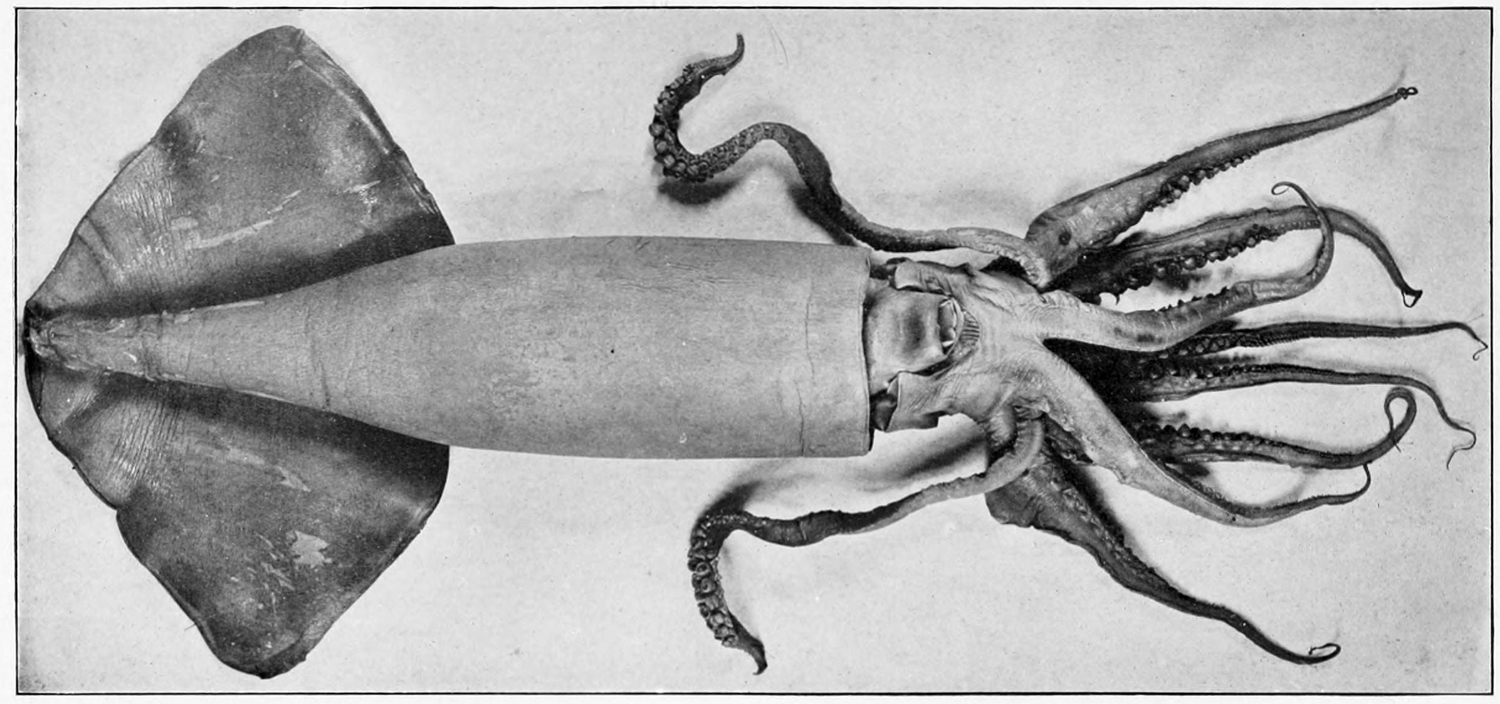
Humboldt squid (Dosidicus gigas, max. 1.5 m or 4.9 ft)

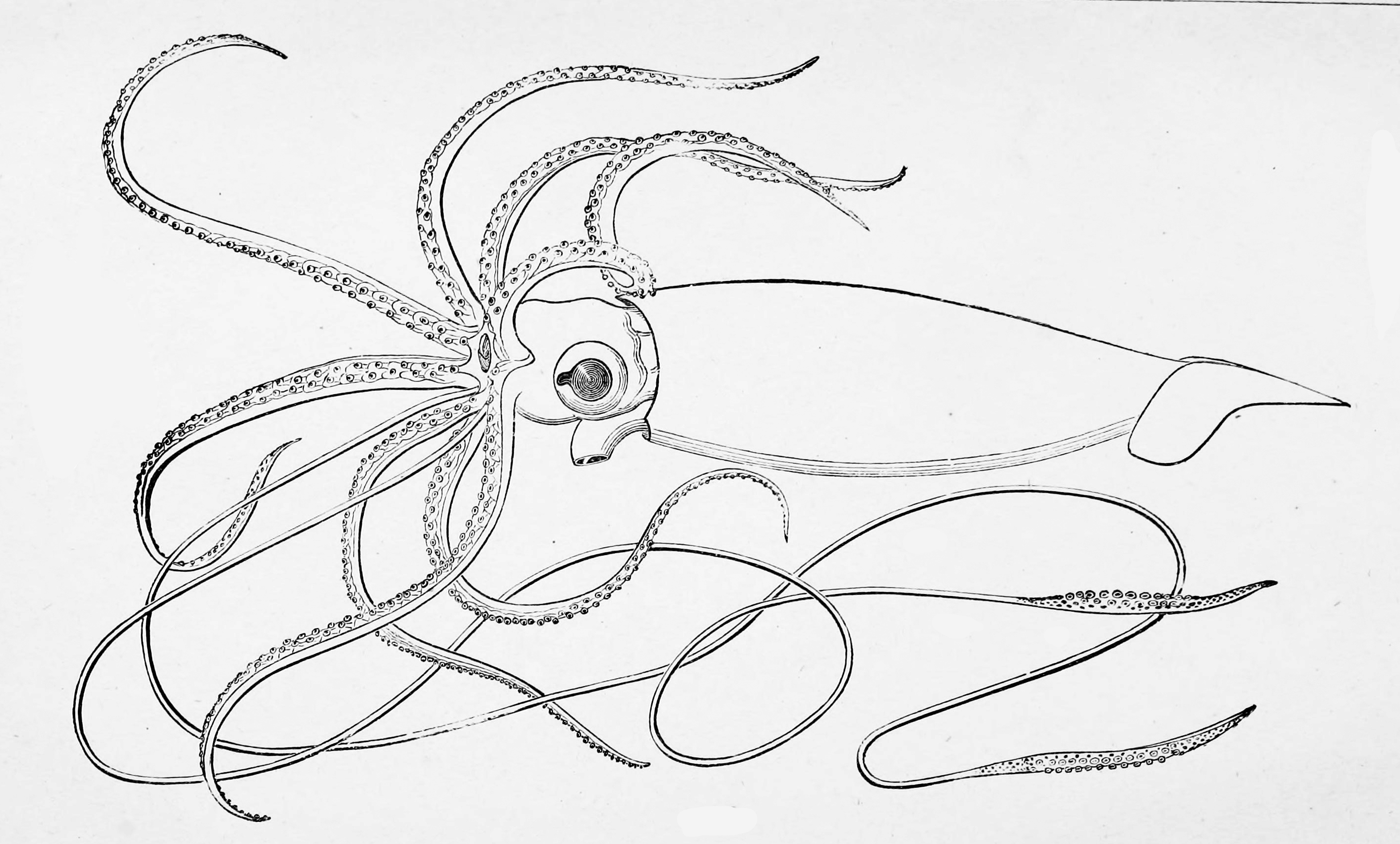
Giant squid (Architeuthis dux, max. 10–12 m or 33–39 ft, according to older reports, up to 20–21 m or 66–69 ft)

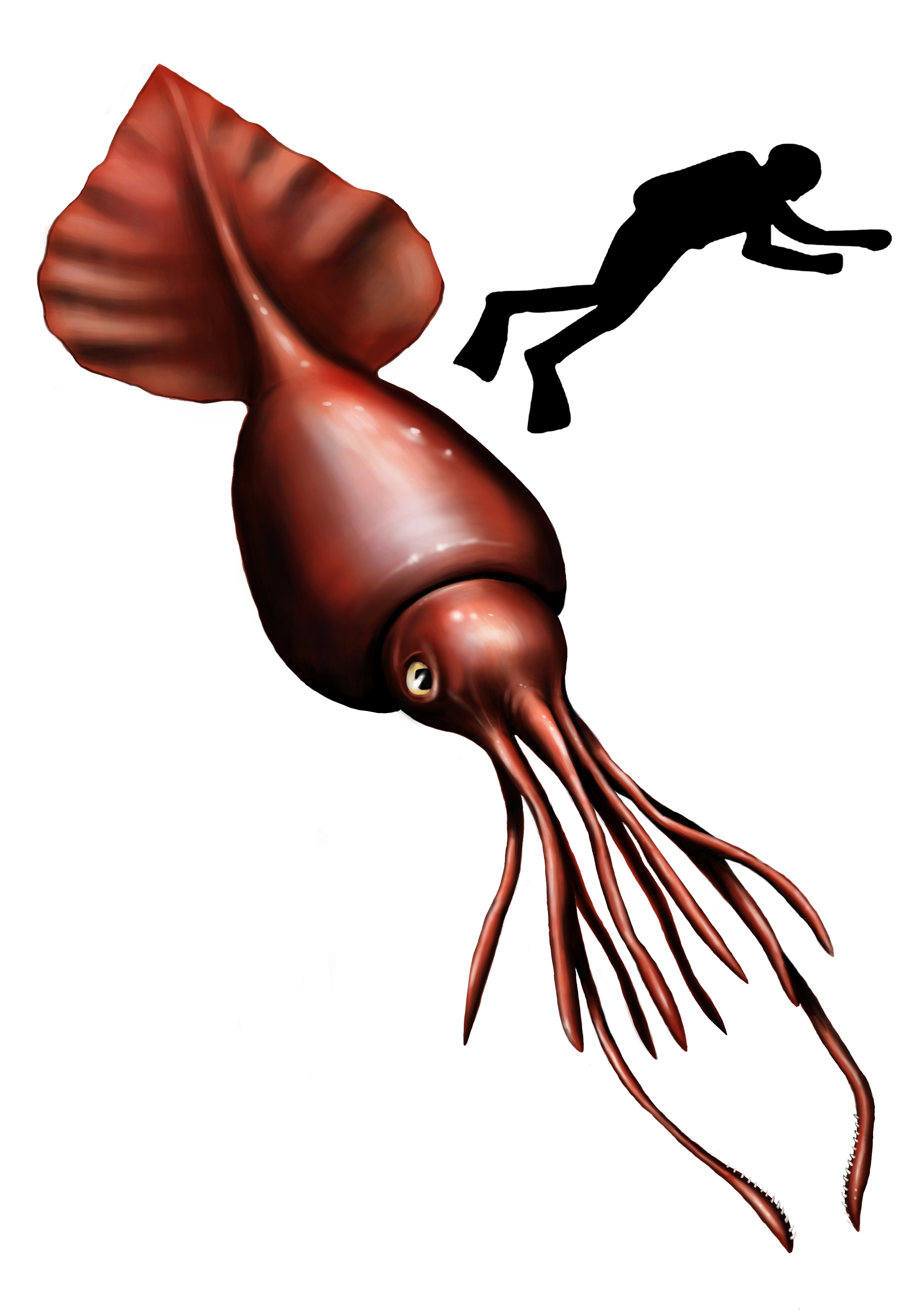
Colossal squid (Mesonychoteuthis hamiltoni, max. 12–14 m or 39–46 ft)

== See also ==
- Giant squid in popular culture
- Kraken in popular culture

== Bibliography ==
- Jékely, Endre (1977). A vizek óriásai (in Hungarian). Budapest: Gondolat Könyvkiadó.
- Burnett, Joseph W.; Rifkin, Jacquie F. (1996). Williamson, John A.; Fenner, Peter J. (eds.). Venomous and Poisonous Marine Animals: a Medical and Biological Handbook (4 ed.). UNSW Press. ISBN 0868402796.
- Leidenfrost, Gyula (1936). Keserű tenger (in Hungarian). Budapest: Franklin Társulat.
- Other stories
- The octopus : or, the "devil-fish" of fiction and of fact

== Other ==
- Polip vert meg egy ausztrál tengerparton sétáló kutatót
