= Malcolm Clarke (zoologist) =

British marine biologist

Malcolm Clarke FRS
- Born: Malcolm Roy Clarke; 24 October 1930; Birmingham
- Died: 10 May 2013 (aged 82); Pico, Azores
- Known for: "Wide-ranging and major studies of the physiology, distribution and systematics of squid"
- Spouse: Dorothy Clara Knight
- Awards: FRS
- Scientific career
- Institutions: National Institute of Oceanography; Marine Biological Association

Malcolm Roy Clarke FRS (24 October 1930 – 10 May 2013) was a British marine biologist. He is most well known for his extensive work on cephalopods and whales.

== Career ==
Clarke did his National Service in the Royal Army Medical Corps from 1948 to 1950.

He founded the Cephalopod International Advisory Council, serving for a time as its Secretary and President.

== Awards and honours ==
Clarke was elected a Fellow of the Royal Society in 1981. The deep-sea anglerfish Oneirodes clarkei Swinney & Pietsch, 1988 was named in his honor.

== Personal life ==
Clarke married Dorothy Clara Knight in 1958 and had three sons and one daughter together.
