= Richard Ellis (biologist) =

American painter (1938–2024)

Richard Ellis (April 2, 1938 – May 21, 2024) was an American marine biologist, author, and illustrator. He was a research associate in the American Museum of Natural History's division of paleontology, special adviser to the American Cetacean Society, and a member of the Explorers Club. He was a U.S. delegate to the International Whaling Commission from 1980 to 1990.

Despite no formal training in marine biology, painting or writing, his paintings have been exhibited in galleries and museums around the world, and his murals can be seen in the Denver Museum of Natural History, the New Bedford Whaling Museum in Massachusetts, and Whaleworld, a museum in Albany, Western Australia. He authored and illustrated more than two dozen books on marine life.

== Early life ==
Richard Ellis was born on April 2, 1938, in Queens, New York. His parents, Richard and Sylvia Ellis, were lawyers. His father worked at the United Transformer Corporation, while his mother did not practice. It was during his childhood that Richard acquired a love for the ocean which he kept throughout his life.

Richard Ellis graduated from the University of Pennsylvania in 1959 with a degree in American civilization. After graduating, he joined the United States Army and was stationed in Honolulu, Hawaii where he spent his free time surfing and swimming in the Pacific Ocean.

== Career ==
In 1969 at the age of 31, Ellis was hired by the American Museum of Natural History as an exhibition designer and was asked to help build a life-sized blue whale for the Hall of Ocean Life for the museum's 100-year anniversary. After relying on paintings and photos of dead animals for the creation of the exhibit, Mr. Ellis decided to start swimming with animals in their natural habitat to depict them more accurately.

Ellis spent most of his life traveling to exotic locations and used scuba gear and a steel cage to swim with various marine animals. He was one of the first ocean explorers to swim with great white sharks.

His photorealistic paintings of whales were published in Audubon, National Wildlife Magazine and Encyclopedia Britannia. He maintained an affiliation with the American Museum of Natural History for most of his life but is most well-known for writing and illustrating books on marine animals. His notable works include The Book of Whales (1980), Monsters of the Sea (1994), The Search for the Giant Squid (1998), and Tuna: A Love Story (2008). On Thin Ice (2009) looks into the changing world of polar bears and highlights their problems caused by global warming and disappearing Arctic ice.

Richard Ellis curated a show on sharks in art for the Fort Lauderdale Art Museum, from May 2012 to January 2013.

== Personal life ==
Ellis married Anna Kneeland in 1963. They had a daughter, Elizabeth, and a son, Timo. They divorced in 1981.

He died at the age of 86 at an assisted living facility in Norwood, New Jersey. According to his daughter, the cause of death was cardiac arrest.
