= Cycloteuthis akimushkini =

Scientific classification
- Kingdom: Animalia
- Phylum: Mollusca
- Class: Cephalopoda
- Order: Oegopsida
- Family: Cycloteuthidae
- Genus: Cycloteuthis
- Species: C. akimushkini

Binomial name
- Cycloteuthis akimushkini Filippova, 1968

Species of squid

Cycloteuthis akimushkini is a species of squid in the family Cycloteuthidae. This squid is found mostly in the tropical, subtropical and sub-Antarctic parts of the eastern Indian Ocean, at depths of between 100 and 120 m.

== Description ==
The mantle is conical shaped, tapering towards a tail. Its length is approximately 60 cm. A strongly pronounced muscular ridge runs along the dorsal surface of the mantle. The fins are large and rounded, taking up 50% of the overall mantle length. The arms are about 70% of the mantle length, though the true measurements are unknown. The feeding tentacles are long, their stalks are stout, and somewhat flattened.

Small, round orange photophores were found in the eyelid tissues, but nowhere else on the body.
