= Richard E. Young =

American teuthologist

Richard E. Young (born August 20, 1938) is a teuthologist. He is an Emeritus Professor of Oceanography at the University of Hawaii's School of Ocean and Earth Science and Technology.

== Education ==
Young took a Bachelor of Arts degree at Pomona College in 1960, his Master of Science degree was taken at the University of Southern California in 1964 and his PH.D. was awarded in 1968 by the University of Miami, Institute of Marine Sciences.

== Career ==
He was a visiting Assistant Professor of Zoology at the Ohio Wesleyan University from September, 1968 to June, 1969. He was appointed as an Associate Professor of Oceanography at the University of Hawaii in 1973 and in 1983 he was appointed as Professor of Oceanography. He officially retired in 2001 but continued as an Emeritus Professor to the present.

His current areas of study are the evolution, systematics and functional morphology of cephalopods, and the ecological roles that cephalopods perform in present and past oceanic communities. His past work on cephalopods included bioluminescence, the ecology of the larvae and the ecology of midwater animals. He has most recently being studying the ecology of animals in the Mesopelagic Boundary Region. From 1996 up to the present he has been a major contributor on cephalopods to the Tree of Life Web Project.

== Selected publications ==
The following are some publications where Young is a co-author:

- 1969 Young R.E. & Roper C.F.E. A monograph of the Cephalopoda of the North Atlantic: the family Cycloteuthidae. Smithsonian Contributions to Zoology 5: 1-24, 3 figures, 9 plates. page(s): 5-15; pl. 5-9
- 1975 Roper, C. F. E., and R. E. Young. Vertical distribution of pelagic cephalopods. Smithsonian Contributions to Zoology 209: 1–51.
- 1998 Young, R. E. and R. Harman. The phylogeny of the "enoploteuthid" families. Smithson. Contributions Zool., No. 586: 257-270.
- 1998 Young, R. E., L. Burgess, C. F. E. Roper, M. Sweeney and S. Stephen. Classification of the Enoploteuthidae, Pyroteuthidae and Ancistrocheiridae. Smithsonian Contr. Zool., No. 586:239-256.
- 1998 with Mangold, K. M. and R. E. Young. The systematic value of the digestive organs. Smithson. Contributions Zool., No. 586: 21-30.
- 1998 Clarke, M.and R. Young Description and analysis of cephalopod beaks from stomachs of six species of odontocete cetaceans stranded on Hawaiian shores. J. Mar. Biol. Assoc. U. K., 78: 623-641.
- 1998 Young, R.E. and J. Hirota. Review of the ecology of Sthenoteuthis oualaniensis near the Hawaiian Archipelago. In: Okutani T (ed.) Contributed papers to international symposium on large pelagic squids. Japan Marine Fishery Resources Research Center, Tokyo, p 131-143
- 1998 Young, R., M. Vecchione and D. Donovan. The evolution of coleoid cephalopods and their present biodiversity and ecology. S. African Jour. Mar. Sci., In press.
- 1998 Vecchione, M. and R. E. Young. A newly discovered family of oceanic squids (Cephalopoda; Oegopsida). S. African Jour. Mar. Sci., In press.
- 1999 Bower, J. R., M. P. Seki, R. E. Young, K. A. Bigelow, J. Hirota and P. Flament. Cephalopod paralarvae assemblages in Hawaiian waters. Mar. Ecol. Prog. Ser., 185: 203-212.
- 1999 Vecchione, M., R. E. Young, D. T. Donovan and P. G. Rodhouse. Reevaluation of coleoid cephalopod relationships based on modified arms in the Jurassic coleoid Mastigophora. Lethaia, 32: 113-118.
- 1999 Young, R. E. and M. Vecchione. 1999. Morphological observations on a hatchling and a paralarva of the vampire squid, Vampyroteuthis infernalis Chun. Proc. Biol. Soc. Wash., 112: 661-666.
- 2000 Vecchione, M., M.F. Mickevich, K. Faichald, B.B. Collette, A.B. Williams, T.A. Munroe, and R.E. Young. The importance of assessing taxonomic adequacy to determine fishing effects on marine biodiversity. ICES Journal of Marine Science, 57: 677-681.
- 2000 Vecchione, M., R.E. Young and D. Carlini. Reconstruction of ancestral character states in neocoloeoid cephalopods based on parsimony. Am. Malac. Bull.
- 2001 Carlini, D. B., R. E. Young, and M. Vecchione. A molecular phylogeny of the Octopoda (Mollusca: Cephalopoda) evaluated in light of morphological evidence. Mol. Phylogeny and Evol. In Press.
- 2001 Vecchione, M., R. E. Young, A. Guerra, D. J. Lindsay, D. A. Clague, J. M. Bernhard, W. W. Sager, A. F. Gonzalez, F. J. Rocha, and M. Segonzac Worldwide Observations of Remarkable Deep-Sea Squids. Science 2001 December 21; 294: 2505-2506.
- 2002 Young, R.E. and M. Vecchione. Evolution of the gills in the Octopodiformes. Bull. Mar. Sci. . 71: 1003-1018.
- 2005 Young, R. E. and M. Vecchione. 2005. Narrowteuthis nesisi, a new genus and new species of the squid family Neoteuthidae (Mollusca; Cephalopoda). Proceedings of the Biological Society of Washington, 118 (3): 566-569.
- 2006 Young, R. E., M. Vecchione, U. Piatkowski. Promachoteuthis sloani, a new species of the squid family Promachoteuthidae (Mollusca: Cephalopoda). Proceedings of the Biological Society of Washington, 119 (2): 287-292.
- 2006 Young, R. E., M. Vecchione, U. Piatkowski and C. F. E. Roper. A redescription of Planctoteuthis levimana (Lönnberg, 1896) (Mollusca; Cephalopoda), with a brief review of the genus. 2006. Proc. Biol. Soc. Wash. 119(4): 586-591.
- 2006 Vecchione, M., and R. E. Young. The squid family Magnapinnidae (Mollusca: Cephalopoda) in the Atlantic Ocean, with a description of a new species. Proceedings of the Biological Society of Washington, 119 (3): 365-372.
- 2007 Young, R. E., M. Vecchione and C.F.E. Roper. A new genus and three new species of decapodiform cephalopods (Mollusca: Cephalopoda). Rev. Fish. Biol. Fisheries, 17: 353-365.
- 2008 Vecchione, M., Young, R. E. and M. J. Sweeney. Classification of living forms. Treatise on Invertebrate Paleontology. Part M. Cephalopoda; Coleoidea; Neocoleoidea. In press.
- 2008 Young, R. E., A. Lindgren and M. Vecchione. A new species of the squid family Mastigoteuthidae (Mollusca: Cephalopoda). Proceedings of the Biological Society of Washington. In Press.
- 2008 Vecchione, M., Young, R. E., and U. Piatkowski. Biogeography of cephalopods of the northern mid-Atlantic Ridge. Marine Biology Research, in press.

== Taxa named ==
The squid genus Discoteuthis was described by Young and Roper in 1969 with two species.
