= Clyde Roper =

American zoologist (born 1937)

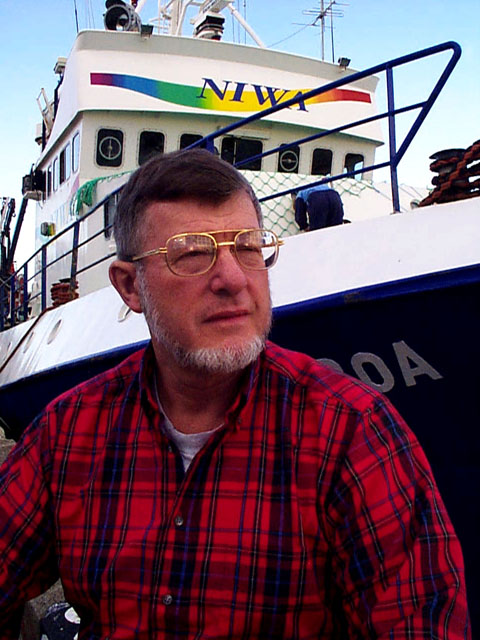
Clyde Roper during the 1999 giant squid expedition to New Zealand

Clyde F. E. Roper (born 1937) is a zoologist at the National Museum of Natural History in Washington, D.C. He has organised a number of expeditions to New Zealand to study giant squid, including in 1997 and 1999. He graduated from Transylvania University in Lexington, Kentucky, in 1959.

Long associated with the National Museum of Natural History, he joined the Smithsonian Institution in 1966.

He was featured in an episode of Errol Morris' TV series First Person (Season 1, Episode 7).

Roper has two adult children and five grandchildren.

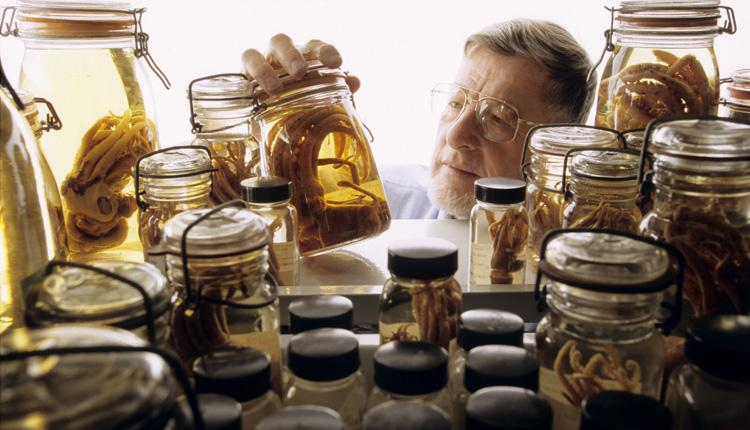
Clyde Roper with preserved cephalopod specimens from the Smithsonian's wet collections

== See also ==
- Crittercam
