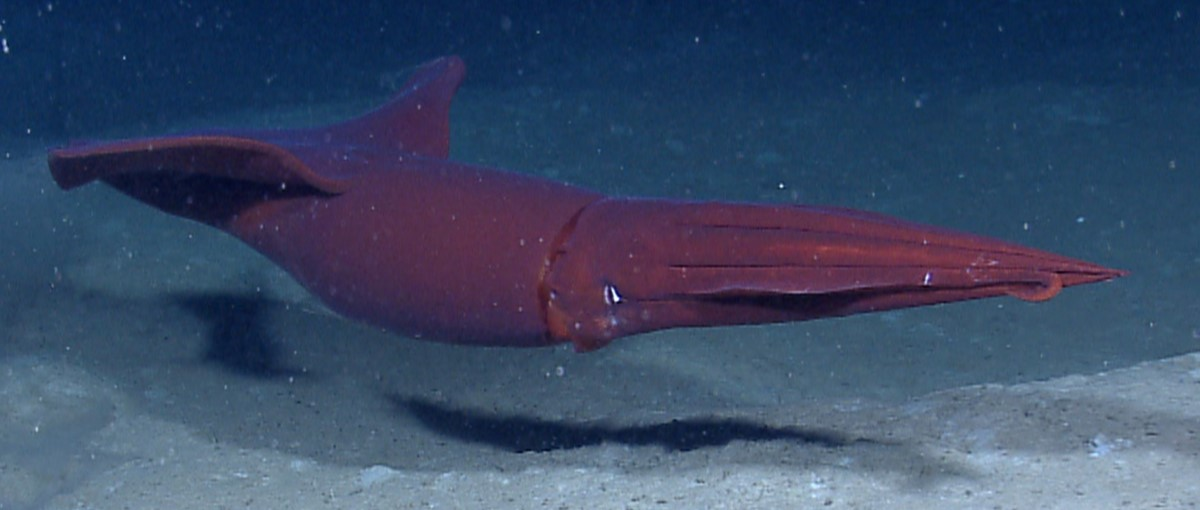
- Pholidoteuthis adami observed in the Gulf of Mexico by NOAA

Conservation status
- Least Concern (IUCN 3.1)

Scientific classification
- Kingdom: Animalia
- Phylum: Mollusca
- Class: Cephalopoda
- Order: Oegopsida
- Family: Pholidoteuthidae
- Genus: Pholidoteuthis
- Species: P. adami

Binomial name
- Pholidoteuthis adami G. L. Voss, 1956

Synonyms
- Pholidoteuthis uruguayensis Leta, 1987

= Pholidoteuthis adami =

Species of deep-sea squid

Pholidoteuthis adami, sometimes referred to as the Western Atlantic scaled squid or pink scaled squid, is a deep-sea species of squid.

== Description ==
Pholidoteuthis adami is named in honor of Dr. W. Adam of Bruxelles, who named the genus Pholidoteuthis. This species was initially described as an "animal of large to gigantic size; fins a marginal fringe bordering the slender posterior point of the mantle; skin smooth; alternate cups and suckers along the entire length of the tentacular stalk". The initial description relied on 31 specimens collected by the USFWS vessel Oregon in 1950–1956; the holotype (USNM 575139) is a female with a mantle length of 175 mm (6.9 in), while the other 30 specimens ranged from 146–305 mm (5.7–12.0 in). A Food and Agriculture Organization document lists a maximum mantle length of 780–800 mm (31–31 in).

The mantle of this species is stated to be "thick and soft, choroidal", broadest anteriorly (towards the head) and quickly tapering into a "long attenuated tail". The mantle is covered with a thin layer of closely-set non-overlapping "scale-like plates", irregularly pentagonal in shape and 0.5 mm in diameter, which are pale vinous red in color and sparsely scattered with chromatophores. These scales or more accurately "dermal cushions" contain a solution of ammonium chloride, which is known to provide buoyancy in other squid species and likely to provide the same in P. adami. The fins flank the scaled portion of the mantle; they are sagittate (arrowhead-like) in shape, are 3/4 to 4/5 of the mantle's length, and noted to be "quite broad", 60–70% of the mantle length and broadest in the third of the fin towards the front of the animal. The head is narrower than the mantle. The eyes are large and "sunken deeply into the head"; they do not bulge out from the head. The siphon is described as "fairly large but weak", with a slightly sinuous, simple locking apparatus. The gladius is straight-edged, long and slender, with an expanded "vane" ending in a pointed, long and slender conus.

The arms are 65–75% of the mantle's length, "long and stout at their bases" and "attenuating" towards their tips; they easily detach from the body similar to the un-scaled skin. The arm bases are said to be one of the few places on the body with visible chromatophores. The third pair of arms, which are the longest arms, has indications of a "swimming membrane" in some specimens, though it is not always apparent. The round, obliquely mounted suckers are arranged in two rows and attached to slender "pedicels". The suckers possess chitinous rings; in the basal suckers these possess triangular "teeth" on the margins away from the arm's bases, while in the middle of the arms these "teeth" are found all around the margins of the sucker. The long and slender tentacles are somewhat flattened, with 4 rows of suckers on non-expanded but very elongated tentacle clubs; the rows of suckers are densest towards the tips of the clubs.

The species was noted to possess no hooks or light organs. Live scaled squid are dark red to purple in color.

== Taxonomy ==
Though some experts considered this species to be a member of Lepidoteuthidae based on characters of the gladius, separating the two supposed members of Pholidoteuthis (congeners), a later study proved that it is indeed the sister species of Pholidoteuthis massyae, being similar except for P. adami's fins which extend back to form a triangular "tail", with Lepidoteuthis being closer related to the octopus squids (Octopoteuthidae). A 2022 study recovered the two families, grouped into Octopoteuthoidea, in a more basal position than Pholidoteuthis, branching off just before the lineage that led to this genus and the families Chiroteuthidae, Joubiniteuthidae, Magnapinnidae, and Mastigoteuthidae.

== Habitat and distribution ==
The holotype was collected 200 fathoms down, at 29°11.5′N 88°07.5′W, off the coast of Texas and east of the Mississippi Delta, while the other specimens collected elsewhere in the upper Gulf of Mexico. This species was subsequently found to range from off Cape Hatteras down to offshore of Río de la Plata; specimens were captured at depths ranging from 360–2,000 m (1,180–6,560 ft) (in the bathyal region), though are most often found 625–750 m (2,051–2,461 ft) down.

== Biology ==
This scaled squid is thought to undergo diel migration, as "huge schools" were recorded during nighttime at the surface of the Gulf of Mexico, and they were never recorded by deep-sea trawling during this time. A member of this species was observed in the Exuma Sound in 2013 using an underwater camera platform; a similar platform equipped with a lure mimicking the bioluminescent Atolla jelly would later observe a juvenile giant squid. The observed P. adami was observed to repeatedly attempt to strike giant isopods (Bathynomus giganteus) which were feeding at a bait crate, though it quickly retreated after each strike attempt, before catching any of the isopods.

P. adami or a similar species is preyed upon by the short-finned pilot whale, and the sperm whale, which might be the reason why this species mates near the sea floor.

=== Reproduction ===
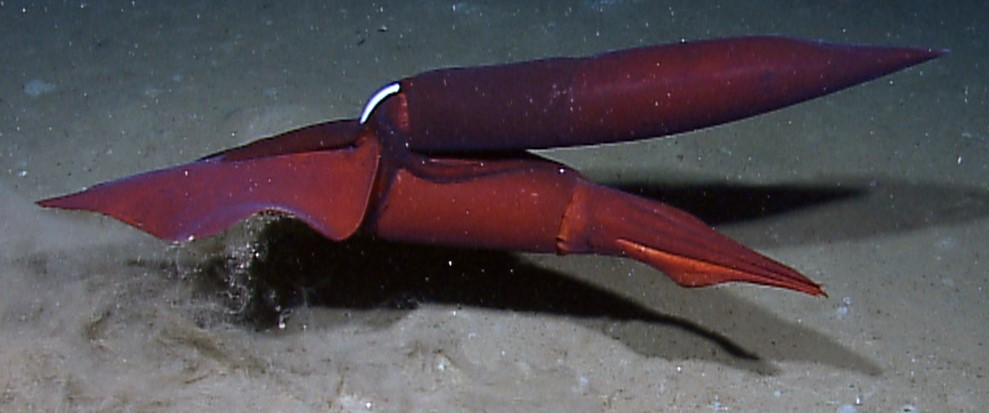
A Pholidoteuthis adami couple mates. The white "terminal organ" embeds spermatophores into the female's mantle

The mating behavior of P. adami has been observed in situ through ROV footage; hovering close to the seabed, the squids lined up parallel with their partners, "heading in the opposite direction" or facing each other. When coupled, males had their ventrum facing upwards (being upside-down), firmly gripping the swimming female while his "terminal organ" (equivalent of a penis) extended out of his siphon to presumably deposit spermatophores on the dorsal side of the female's mantle. Though no spermatophores were visible in the video, examinations of a female museum specimen revealed 15–20 spermatangia deeply embedded in the muscle tissues of her mantle, in the same location as the point of contact in the live specimens. Furthermore, both developing oocytes and ripe ova were found in this female specimen, suggesting a "repeated spawning strategy". The upside-down position of the male is proposed to ensure proper positioning of the spermatangia for proper fertilization, along with maximizing the female's comfort and thus prolonging the mating period, to prevent the female from grabbing and eating him, and/or improving the terminal organ's mobility by giving it more room to move. The spermatangia is suggested to be deposited one by one as the terminal organ's opening is narrow, which would require prolonged mating times to implant a dozen or more spermatangia. This mating period is much longer compared to other species of squid, such as Octopoteuthis deletron, or the hectocotylus-using pygmy squid (Idiosepius paradoxus), which completes copulatory bouts in about 4–5.5 seconds. This behavior of mating near the seafloor may be to increase acoustic backscatter, which would interfere with the acoustic detection ability of toothed whales.

Juveniles have strongly heart-shaped fins; the dermal cushions also begin to grow during this stage of development.
