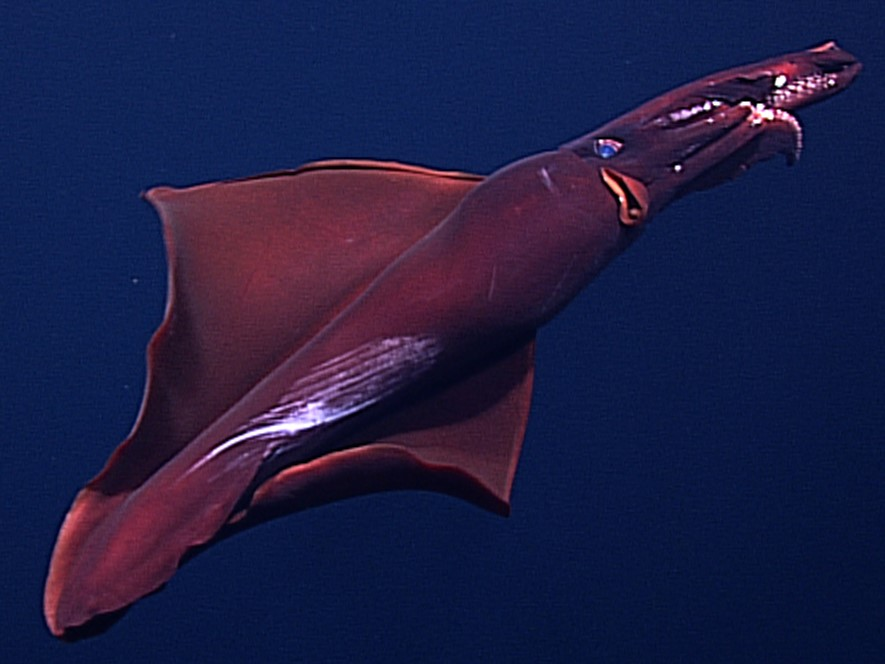
- Taningia cf. danae, Hutchison Seamounts, off Hawai'i, 2015

Conservation status
- Least Concern (IUCN 3.1)

Scientific classification
- Kingdom: Animalia
- Phylum: Mollusca
- Class: Cephalopoda
- Order: Oegopsida
- Family: Octopoteuthidae
- Genus: Taningia
- Species: T. danae

Binomial name
- Taningia danae Joubin, 1931

Synonyms
- List: ?Sepia unguiculata Molina, 1792; ?Enoploteuthis molina Orbigny, 1848; ?Enoploteuthis cooki Owen, 1881; ?Cucioteuthis unguiculatus Joubin, 1898; ?Cucioteuthis unguiculata Rees & Maul, 1956

= Taningia danae =

Species of cephalopods

Taningia danae, the Dana octopus squid, is a species of squid in the family Octopoteuthidae, the octopus squids. It is one of the largest known squid species, and it has one of the largest photophores (light organs) known in any organism, useful in the deep-sea environments that the species inhabits.

== Discovery ==
The possible (but unconfirmed) first specimen of this species was collected in 1769, when Joseph Banks, member of Captain Cook’s first voyage, spotted a massive "cuttlefish" floating in the South Pacific, off the coast of Chile. Seabirds had already damaged it, and most of the remaining carcass was prepared into a meal which Banks described as "one of the best soups [he] ever ate". However, he made sure to preserve an arm, some entrails, and the buccal mass including the beak, which would eventually enter John Hunter's collection in London; the surviving buccal mass (apparently prepared by John Hunter himself) is still part of the Hunterian Museum’s collection to this day. These specimens received multiple scientific names over the years, such as Sepia unguiculata, Enoploteuthis molina, Enoploteuthis cooki, and Cucioteuthis unguiculatus, though these names cannot be definitively linked to the modern conception of T. danae, and the species assigned to Cucioteuthis are considered nomina dubia. In 1931 the name Taningia danae was coined, after the Danish fisheries biologist Åge Vedel Tåning (1890–1958), and the Danish ship Dana, which collected a more complete specimen that became the holotype of this species. The taxonomic situation of Octopoteuthids in general require further revision.

== Description ==
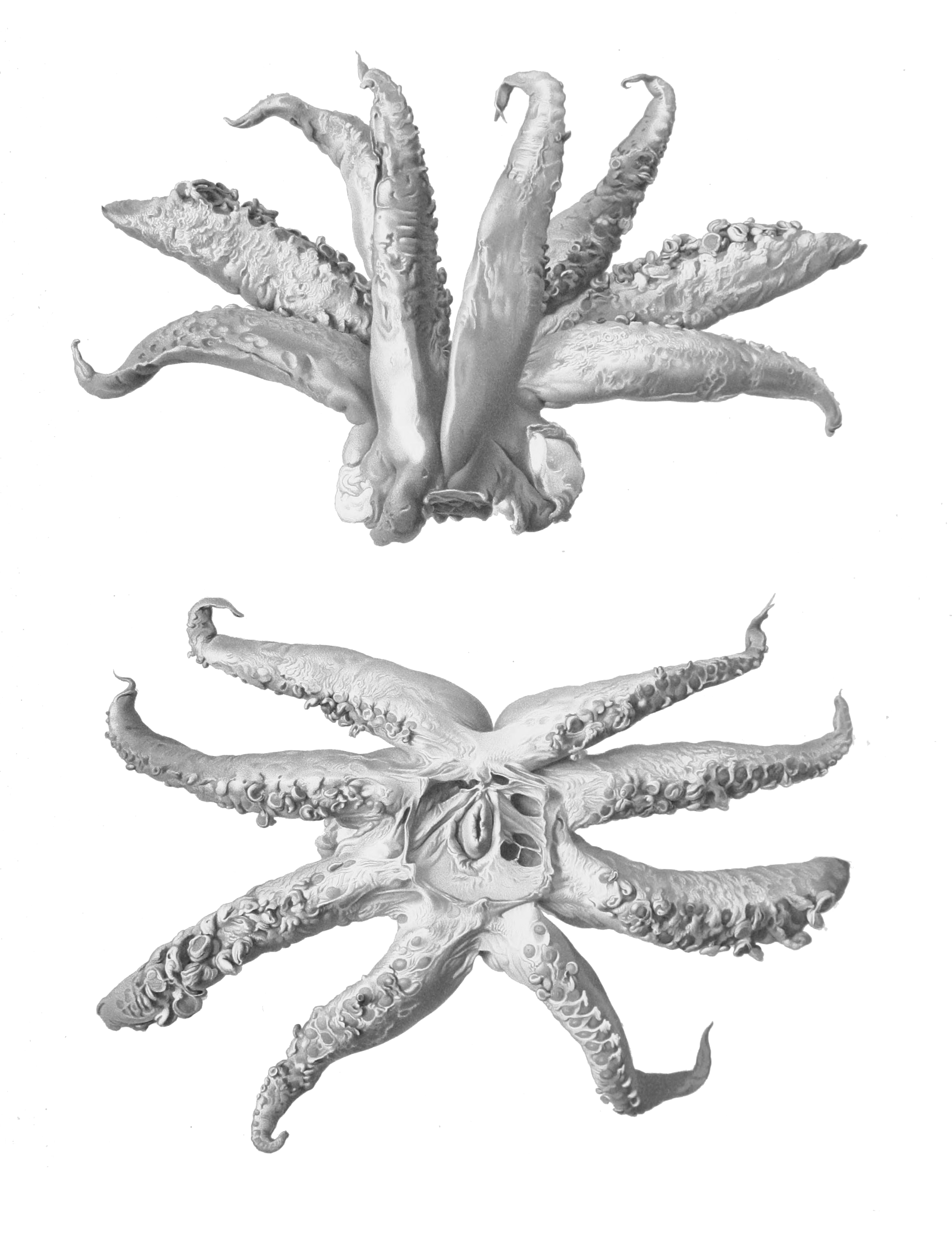
Arms and buccal mass of Taningia danae

Typical of octopus squid, T. danae is characterized by their tentacles that do not continue growing past the paralarval stage, giving them eight arms in adulthood like an octopus. Taningia is separated from Octopoteuthis by adults possessing a large photophore on both tips of the second pair of arms (arm pair II; counted from the dorsal surface), which along with the ink sac light organ are the only known photophores on the body. (Note: Octopoteuthis spp. have photophores on all arm-tips and spread around their body) The arm photophores are some of the largest such organs known in the animal kingdom, being comparable in size to fists or lemons. These organs possess eyelid-like skin flaps which can conceal the light organs when needed. Each arm pair bears two rows of hooks covered by a hood of tissue that can unsheathe them when needed.

This species is traditionally thought to be the only one within the genus and cosmopolitan, but additional species have at times been recognized; this would render Taningia danae as traditionally known a species complex. When recognizing different species of Taningia, T. danae can be distinguished through the blunt shape of the part of the funnel-locking apparatus facing the mouth, arm-hooks only possessing a single tip or point, the male not having enlarged hooks on the base of his arm pair I, the arms being 25-46% mantle length, the skin and funnel opening being smooth (without any accessory structures), along with specific characters of the beak.

The muscular fins account for a large part of the animal's mass; around 61% of the total mass being the fins, 23% being the head and arms combined, and the mantle being 14%. The entire reproductive system makes up half of the total mass of the viscera, but the most massive individual organs are each of the gills, which are 29% of the visceral mass.

The Dana octopus squid reaches a mantle length of up to 1.7 m (5.6 ft) and total length of 2.3 m (7.5 ft). The largest known specimen, a mature female, weighed 161.4 kg (356 lb). (Note: This is the weight of a specimen from the North Atlantic measuring 1.6 m (5.2 ft) in mantle length. The previously reported maximum weight of 61.4 kg (135 lb) for T. danae (based on this same specimen) stems from a typographical error in the original paper of Roper & Vecchione (1993).)

== Biology ==
Taningia danae is considered an oceanic, mesopelagic species that likely spawns in deep waters, although its biology remains largely undocumented. Most of the specimens studied globally - particularly the larger individuals - have been recovered from the guts of its predators, primarily sperm whales, but also sharks, lancetfishes, tunas, wandering albatrosses, and elephant seals. Remains of T. danae have sometimes been found washed ashore on beaches. In 2008, a mantle of T. danae was discovered by students in Bermuda's Grape Bay, while tentacle remnants were found farther along the shore.

In early 2013, a 54 kg (119 lb) specimen with a length (excluding arms) of 103 cm (3.38 ft) was trawled at a depth of 240 m (790 ft) off the coast of Estaca de Bares, Galicia, Spain. It was loaned to the Spanish Institute of Oceanography. A largely-intact 140 kg (310 lb) specimen was found floating around 100km off the South Australian coast and sent to Flinders University in Adelaide where it was dissected in July 2024.

The Dana octopus squid is thought to be extremely abundant in some regions, accounting for over 80% of the weight of sperm-whale-stomach contents off Iberia, and 97% of sampled sperm whales in the Tasman Sea had consumed this octopus squid.

=== Behavior ===
Like other mesopelagic animals, Taningia spp. undergo diel migration, though these squid only migrate for short distances compared to other species (from 900–600 m (3,000–2,000 ft) to 500–240 m (1,640–790 ft) depth).

In 2005, a Japanese research team headed by Tsunemi Kubodera managed to film a purported T. danae in its natural habitat for the first time. The video footage, shot in deep water off Chichi-jima in the northern Pacific Ocean, shows that contrary to earlier assumptions, Taningia is an "aggressive and tenacious predator" and a powerful swimmer, capable of quickly changing direction by flexing its mantle, along with swimming forward and backwards by flapping its muscular fins; swimming by fin undulation has the advantage of providing consistent motion compared to the pump-pause cycle of jet propulsion. This method has been compared to the swimming style of rays, and it has been estimated that the observed octopus squid reached speeds of around 2–2.5 m (6 ft 7 in – 8 ft 2 in) per second. However, specimens found in Japanese seas may be of another species of Taningia; Taningia rubea is endemic to the seas around Japan and can be easily distinguished by its longer "tail".

Taningia danae is bioluminescent, akin to other octopoteuthids and squid families. Black, eyelid-like membranes control the photophore's light emissions; these can be made to "blink", producing a flash of light.

Still image from the first recorded video of a live "Taningia danae" in its natural habitat (Kubodera et al., 2005)

The 2005 video shows T. danae emitting blinding flashes of light from its arm photophores as it attacks its prey (in this instance, a baited line). It is believed that this squid uses the bright flashes to disorient potential prey, as well as potentially gauging its distance to prey, facilitating capture. T. danae bioluminescence has also been suggested to be a defense mechanism; juveniles of this species have been observed moving rapidly in the direction of potential predators, as if hunting, which are probably attempts to disorient and startle the threat with a mock-attack.

The light-organs, capable of producing different flash-patterns, may serve as a method to communicate, perhaps in courtship or aggressive displays related to territory; an observed squid made long and short light-emissions in response to a double-flashlight array mounted to the camera-rig (which resembled Taningia's pair of light-organs). These responses may have been attempts of communication toward the rig as the observed squid did not seem aggressive. Due to a lack of response by the light-array, the squid moved on.

In 2012, T. danae was filmed twice more during a search for the giant squid for the Discovery Channel Special, Monster Squid: The Giant is real.

=== Trophic ecology ===
Taningia danae appears to occupy a high trophic level, at least in the Southern Ocean ecosystem. ^{15}N ratios showed that this squid is a top predator. Stable isotope analysis of specimens from the Great Australian Bight suggests they primarily feed on deep-sea fishes and small squids. Fatty acid profiles of the contents of T. danae's digestive gland were found to be similar to whole homogenized samples of deep-sea fishes like Electrona carlsbergi, Epigonus lenimen, and Lepidorhynchus denticulatus, supporting the hypothesis that these fishes are prey items. Analysis of stomach contents from specimens retrieved off the coast of Spain has found blue whiting (Micromesistius poutassou) vertebrae, Gonatus sp. tentacle-hooks, and integument of crustaceans.

Their carbon isotope ratios indicate that they likely live in the Southern Ocean, but may travel to continental shelf-slope environments like the Great Australian Bight possibly during seasonal upwelling events. The presence of copepod fatty acid biomarkers in T. danae tissues further suggests they are part of a copepod-myctophid-squid food chain, common in the Southern Ocean. T. danae appears to function as a link between deep-sea and shelf-slope environments, contributing to the transport of nutrients and energy between these different marine ecosystems.

T. danae muscle tissues contain high levels of essential fatty acids EPA (20:5ω3) and DHA (22:6ω3), making them a nutrient source for predators such as sperm whales, seabirds, and seals. While T. danae has a relatively low energy density per gram (approximately 2.25 kJ/g) compared to other Southern Ocean fish and squid species, their large body size means individual specimens contain substantial energy. The whole-body energy content of a large T. danae individual (161 kg) can reach up to 362,250 kJ, making it one of the most calorically rich prey items in the Southern Ocean and an efficient food source for large predators like sperm whales.

This species is a known prey item of the sperm whale, a prolific predator of squid. Other predators include the pygmy sperm whale, beaked whales such as the Cuvier's and southern bottlenose whales, dolphins such as the short-finned pilot whale, Risso's and Fraser's dolphins, northern elephant seals, ground sharks such as the tiger, blue, and scalloped hammerhead sharks, dogfish such as the Portuguese dogfish and sleeper sharks, swordfish, and tube-nosed seabirds which scavenge dead squid on the surface, such as the Bulwer's petrel, along with species of albatross like the black-browed, Laysan, and wandering albatrosses.

=== Reproduction ===
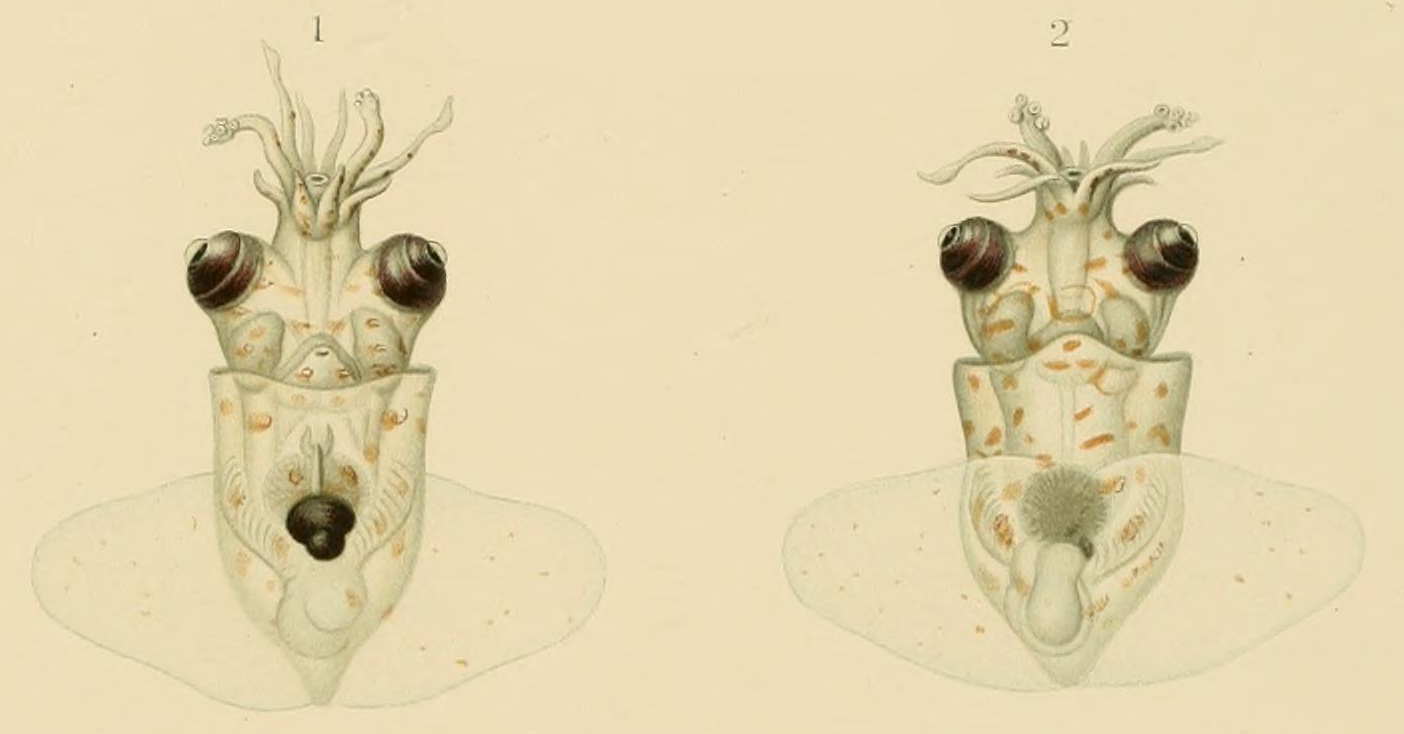
Holotype of Taningia persica — paralarval Taningia sp. collected in the Gulf of Aden.

Taningia danae employs a unique reproductive strategy known as spermatangium implantation, facilitated by the presence of an extendable terminal organ/penis (unlike the hectocotylus of many other cephalopods). During mating, the male uses either its beak or arm hooks to make incisions in the female's tissue, into which it implants spermatophores - packets containing sperm. While spermatangium implantation is observed in several squid species, T. danae is unusual in its use of physical incisions for implantation. In most other squids, females possess specialized structures or receptacles for receiving spermatophores, making T. danae’s method notably distinct. These incisions, typically 30–65 mm (1.2–2.6 in) in length, are usually found in the head, neck, and inner mantle tissues, particularly around the "nuchal" region and collar musculature. Unlike many other cephalopods, T. danae implants their spermatangia deep within muscle layers rather than attaching them externally. Some spermatangia may implant autonomously, likely aided by enzymes or filament-like structures that help them penetrate the tissue. Due to the physical trauma involved in this process, mating may pose a risk of injury to the male, and there is speculation that females may sometimes engage in cannibalism.

The arm-hooks start developing after the paralarva reaches 5 mm (0.20 in) ML; a single photophore on the ink sac also develops at this size, which is thought to be a counter-illumination mechanism in the relatively transparent juveniles. The paralarvae have robust tentacular stalks which disappear at 38 mm (1.5 in) ML, leaving the adult squid with eight arms. A post-larval juvenile 55.6 mm (2.19 in) ML was captured off the coast of Algeria, being the first Mediterranean record of this species. Females begin to sexually mature at 200–400 mm (7.9–15.7 in) ML, with the smallest specimen known to have spawned being 882 mm (34.7 in) ML.

== See also ==
- Thysanoteuthis rhombus, a species somewhat similar in size and appearance
