= Cephalopod dermal structures =

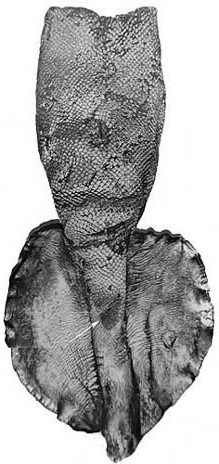
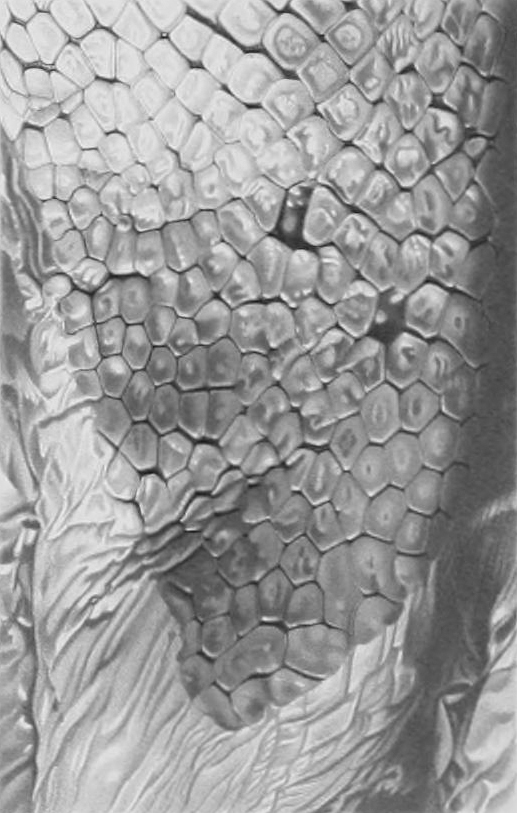
Mantle of Lepidoteuthis grimaldii with the end of the dermal scales indicated by an arrow. A closeup of the scales is shown on the right. This was the first cephalopod species whose dermal structures were studied in detail.

Cephalopods exhibit various dermal structures on their mantles and other parts. These may take the form of conspicuous warts, cushions, papillae or scales, though in many species they are microscopic tubercles. The most elaborate forms are found among the oceanic squid of the order Teuthida, with some of these species being dubbed the scaled squid.

== Morphology and composition ==
Most cephalopod dermal structures take the form of tubercles, and these are the only cartilaginous dermal structures (the various "dermal cushions" being composed of other forms of connective tissue). All three main types of cartilage found in vertebrates are represented among the different squid species: hyaline, elastic and fibrocartilage. Tubercles of hyaline cartilage are primarily associated with cranchiid or glass squid.

The vast majority of cephalopod dermal structures have a thin, overlying epidermal layer, though this is often damaged or missing in captured specimens.

Dermal structures of selected squid species
Species	Family	Structure	Shape	Size in mm ( ML in mm)	Tissue	Epidermis over structure
Asperoteuthis acanthoderma	Chiroteuthidae	Tubercles	Conical	1.0 × 0.4 (144)	Hyaline-like cartilage	Yes
Cranchia scabra	Cranchiidae	Tubercles	Round, triangular, or rectangular bases with 2–5 projections	0.4–0.8 × 0.2–0.4 (94)	Hyaline cartilage	Yes
Histioteuthis meleagroteuthis	Histioteuthidae	Tubercles	Knob-like	from mantle ridge: 0.4–0.8 × 1.3–1.9; from arm ridge: 0.6–2.2 × 0.7–2.3 (38)	Elastic cartilage	Yes
Leachia cyclura	Cranchiidae	Tubercles	Small conical to large complex with numerous conical projections	0.3–0.4 × 0.1–0.2 (55)	Hyaline cartilage	Yes
Lepidoteuthis grimaldii	Lepidoteuthidae	Dermal cushions ("scales")	Rhomboid to hexagonal	2.0 × 0.5 (180)	Connective tissue in honeycomb arrangement	Yes
Liocranchia reinhardti	Cranchiidae	Tubercles	Conical	0.2–0.3 × 0.15–0.2 (29)	Hyaline cartilage	Yes
Mastigoteuthis cordiformis	Mastigoteuthidae	Tubercles	Conical	0.2 × 0.3 (87)	Elastic or fibrocartilage	Yes
Mastigoteuthis hjorti	Mastigoteuthidae	Tubercles	Conical	0.1–0.2 × 0.05–0.1 (93)	Elastic or fibrocartilage	Yes
Pholidoteuthis adami	Pholidoteuthidae	Dermal cushions	Round to pentagonal	0.5 × 0.3 (300)	Connective tissue in honeycomb arrangement	Yes
Pholidoteuthis massyae	Pholidoteuthidae	Tubercles and papillae	Roundish	0.3 × 0.15 (100)	Dense connective tissue with chondrocytes; elastic cartilage	No; acellular cuticle

Other cephalopods with prominent dermal structures include: Brachioteuthis spp.; Galiteuthis glacialis (which has round tubercles); Histioteuthis meleagroteuthis and Histioteuthis miranda (tuberculate ridges); Mastigoteuthis danae (large tubercles in advanced paralarvae); Onykia aequatorialis, Onykia ingens, Onykia lonnbergii, and Onykia robsoni (irregular warts); Slosarczykovia circumantarctica (fibrous integumental net); and all members of the subfamily Cranchiinae (strips of cartilaginous tubercles in various arrangements). Among octopuses, Ocythoe tuberculata is noted for the tubercles and ridges on its mantle.

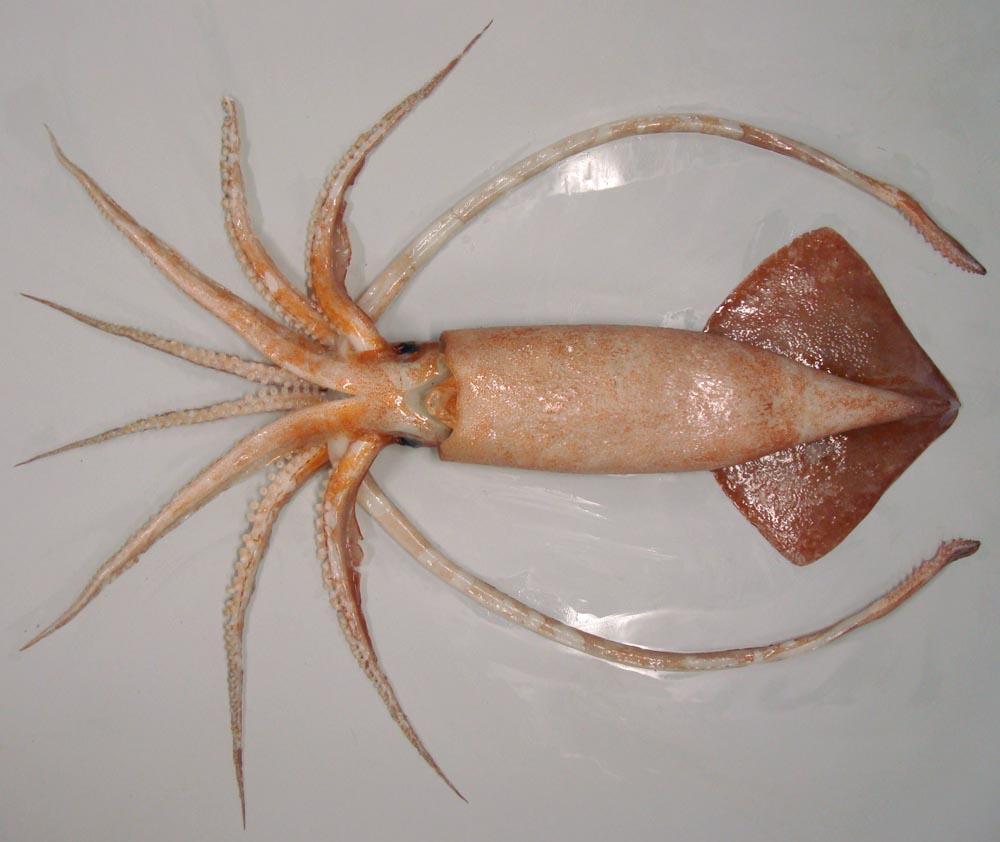
Mature female of Onykia ingens (38.4 cm ML)

Piece of ventral mantle skin from O. ingens

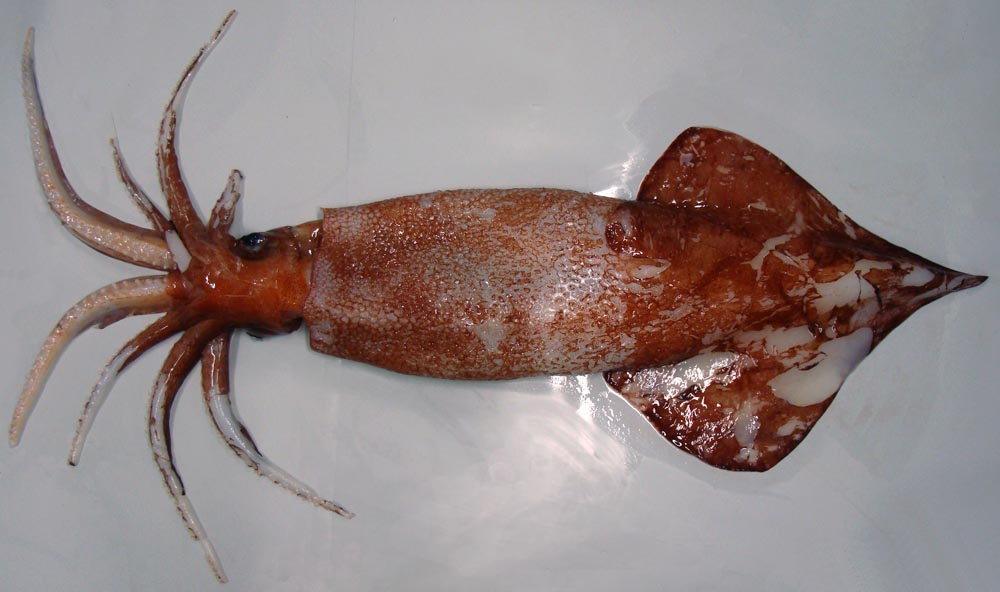
Large mature female of Onykia robsoni (88.5 cm ML) weighing 11.1 kg

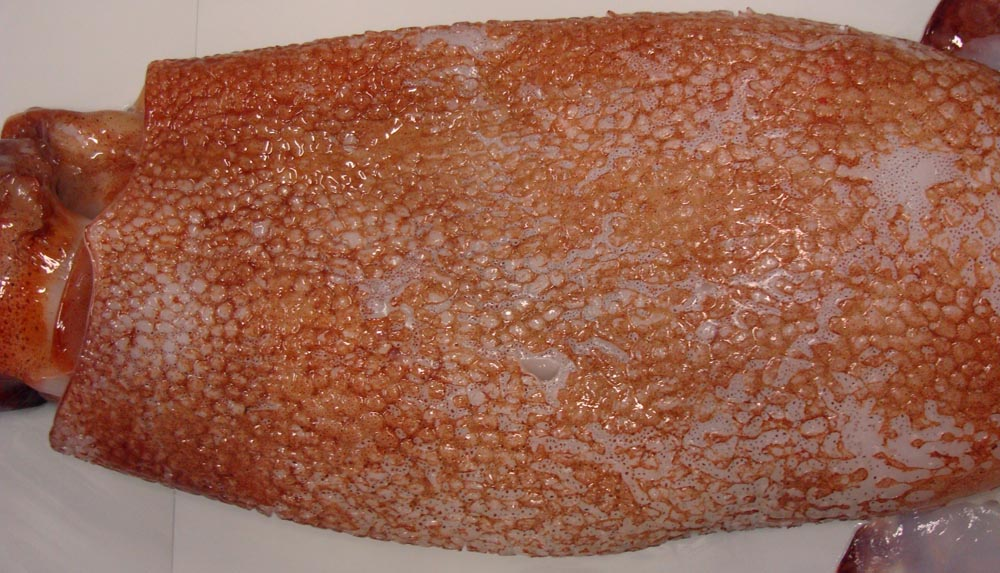
Closeup of the dermal warts from the same O. robsoni specimen

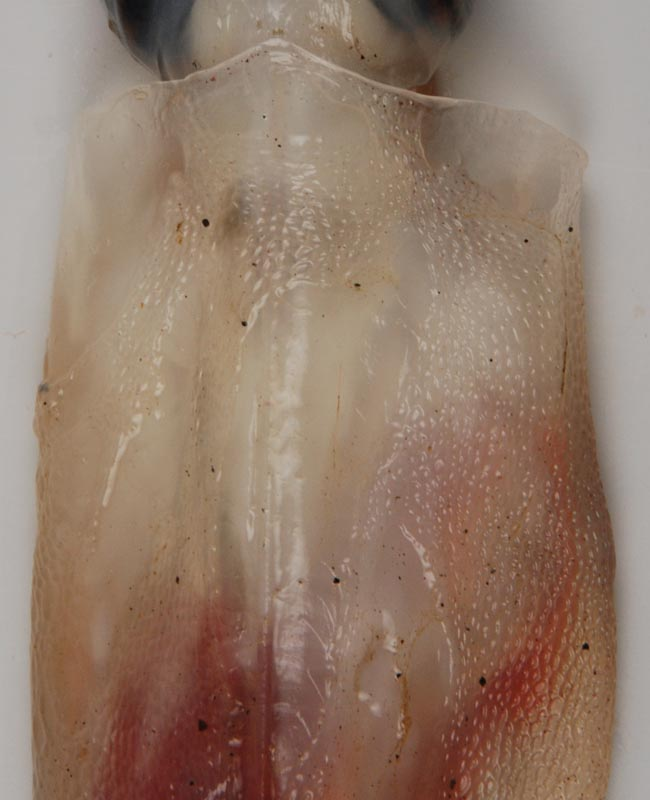
Dorsal mantle of Slosarczykovia circumantarctica (12.2 cm ML)

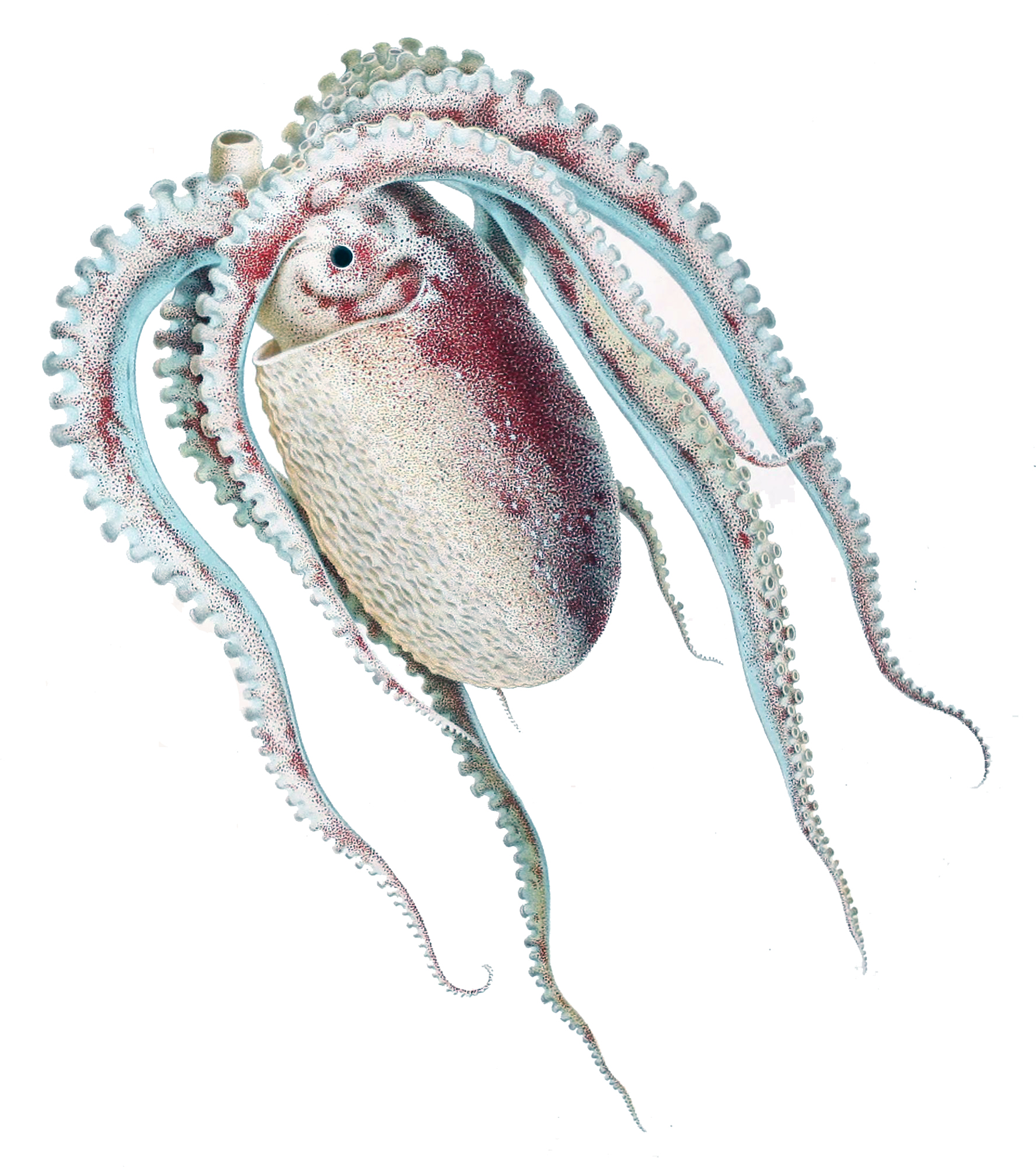
Ocythoe tuberculata with ridges and tubercles visible on mantle

== Function ==
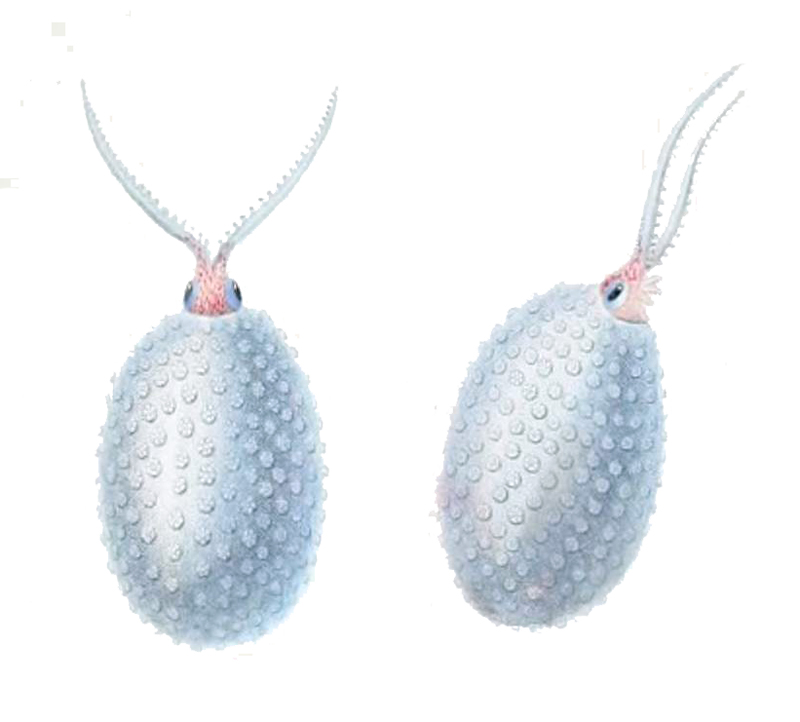
The mantle of Cranchia scabra is covered in numerous multi-pointed cartilaginous tubercles

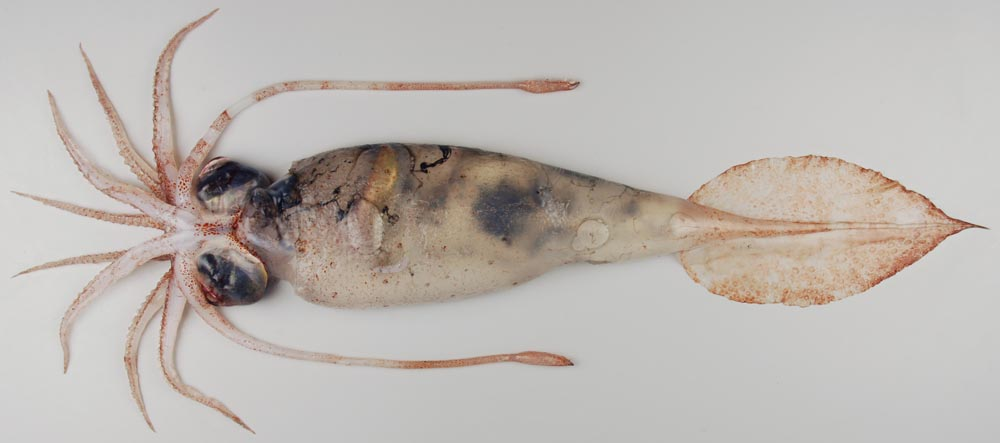
Ventral view of an adult Galiteuthis glacialis from the Ross Sea, with a mantle length of 32.1 cm

Different cephalopod dermal structures are hypothesised to play roles in buoyancy, locomotion, and even pseudoskeletal support.

=== Buoyancy aid ===
Two fundamentally different buoyancy mechanisms associated with dermal structures have been proposed.

==== Buoyancy vest ====
The mantle of Cranchia scabra is covered in multi-pointed cartilaginous tubercles. An anti-predator function has been proposed in the past, but this is thought unlikely given the small size and transparent nature of the tubercles. The tubercles of this species are covered by a thin, epidermal sheath that is often lost during capture. It has been speculated that in the live animal the interstitial space is filled with a buoyant fluid (likely an ammonium chloride solution) and acts as a "buoyancy vest". The hard tubercles may serve to maintain the shape of this structure. It has been estimated that in a C. scabra measuring 10 cm in mantle length (ML), the buoyancy vest could contribute an additional 4% to the animal's total buoyant fluid (most of the remainder being located in the coelom), probably sufficient to achieve neutral buoyancy.

A similar mechanism may be utilised by the much larger Galiteuthis glacialis, which has a very similar combination of tubercles and overlying epidermal sheath.

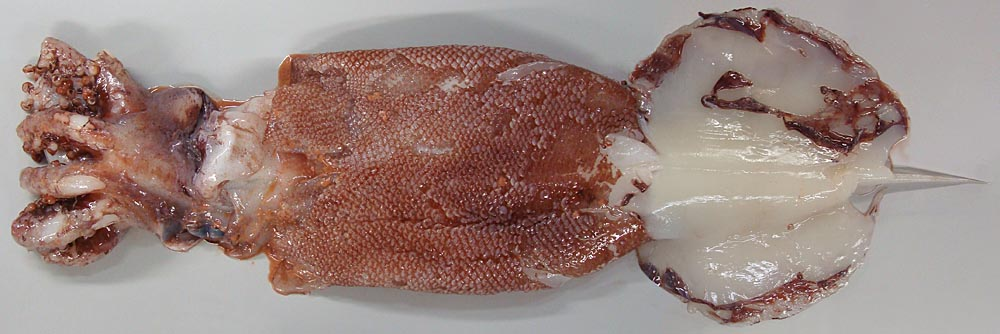
Lepidoteuthis grimaldii female measuring 61.7 cm in mantle length and weighing more than 4 kg

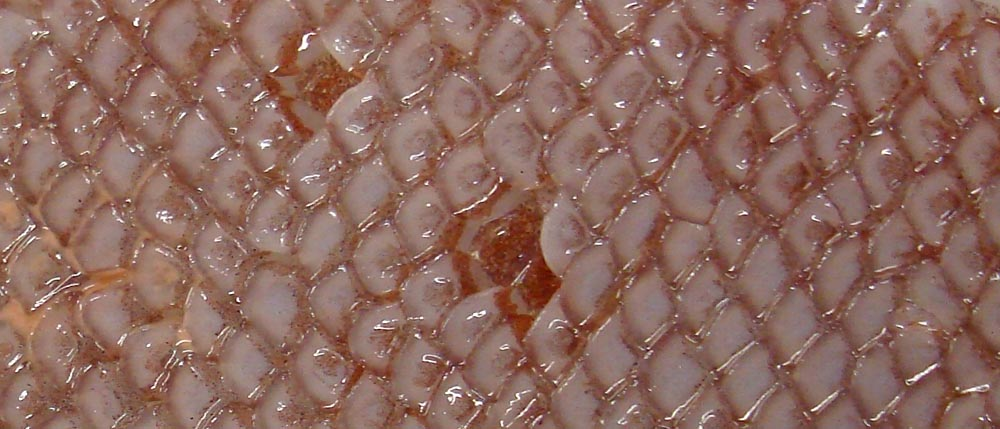
Closeup of the overlapping dermal scales of the same specimen

==== Fluid-filled dermal cushions ====
The overlapping "scales" of Lepidoteuthis grimaldii are actually dermal cushions with a vacuolate internal structure that are continuous with a similarly vacuolate underlying layer of mantle tissue. Ammonium ions (NH_{4}^{+}) are present in the mantle of this species at a measured concentration of 172 mM. Structurally very similar (though non-overlapping) dermal cushions are found in Pholidoteuthis adami. It has been proposed that these two species achieve buoyancy by means of the fluid stored in their vacuolate dermal cushions and upper mantle layer. Given their spongy form, these cushions may also play a secondary protective role.

=== Drag reduction ===
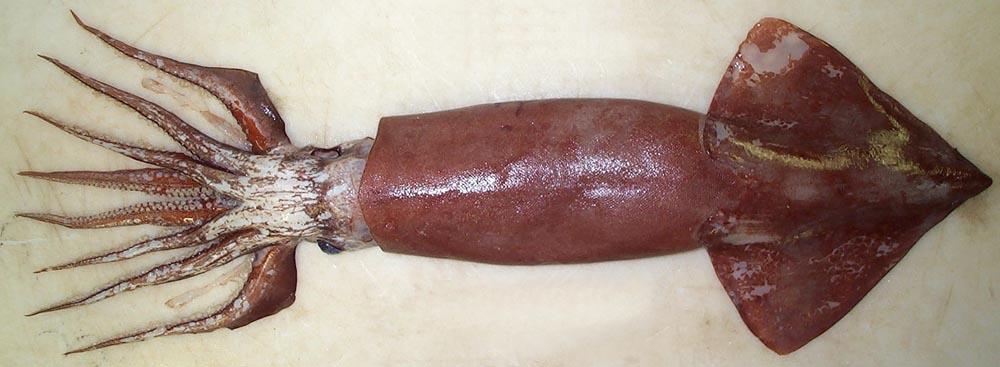
Pholidoteuthis massyae (41.1 cm ML)

The complex dermal structures of Pholidoteuthis massyae may play a role in reducing hydrodynamic drag. More specifically, they may be involved in maintaining laminar flow by preventing or delaying boundary layer separation along the mantle.

It is possible that a similar locomotory mechanism is present in Mastigoteuthis cordiformis and Mastigoteuthis hjorti, though the small size of the tubercles in these species may preclude such a function.

=== Pseudoskeletal support ===
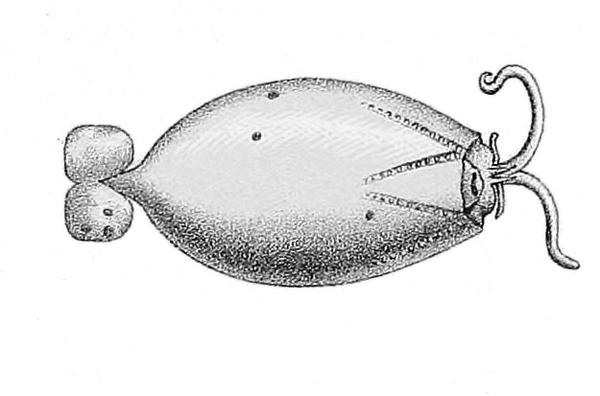
Liocranchia reinhardti

In the cranchiids Leachia cyclura and Liocranchia reinhardti, the dermal tubercles are not distributed throughout the mantle but arranged in discrete cartilaginous bands. A role in buoyancy control is therefore unlikely. One possibility is that these rigid bands play a pseudoskeletal role, maintaining the shape of parts of the mantle during swimming contractions or providing attachment points for mantle muscles or visceral tissue (such as the septum covering the coelom).

The very dense tuberculate ridges found on the arms and dorsal mantle of Histioteuthis meleagroteuthis may similarly provide insertion points for muscles, and are probably most important in juvenile animals, which lack well-developed musculature. In the two other Histioteuthis species with tuberculate ridges—H. meleagroteuthis and H. miranda—these structures likely have the same function.

=== Unknown function ===
The mantle of Asperoteuthis acanthoderma is covered in minute, widely spaced tubercles of hyaline-like cartilage. In a 1990 study of dermal structures in squid, Clyde F. E. Roper and C. C. Lu wrote that they were "unable to suggest a function" for the tubercles of this species, but that due to their small size and spacing they were unlikely to be involved in buoyancy or locomotion.
