= Octopoteuthis danae =

Conservation status
- Data Deficient (IUCN 3.1)

Scientific classification
- Kingdom: Animalia
- Phylum: Mollusca
- Class: Cephalopoda
- Order: Oegopsida
- Family: Octopoteuthidae
- Genus: Octopoteuthis
- Species: O. danae

Binomial name
- Octopoteuthis danae Joubin, 1931

Synonyms
- Octopodoteuthis danae Joubin, 1931

Species of squid

Octopoteuthis danae is a little known species of small squid in the genus Octopoteuthis of the family Octopoteuthidae. They belong to the pelagic squid order Oegopsida. It is found in the Atlantic Ocean. It is distinguished from the other known similar Atlantic species, Octopoteuthis megaptera, by having a shorter tail which has two photophores. Its specific name honours James Dwight Dana (1813–1895) the American mineralogist and geologist who was a member of the U.S. Exploring Expedition in the Pacific of 1838–42 under Charles Wilkes. This expedition discovered that Antarctica was a continent and named it.
