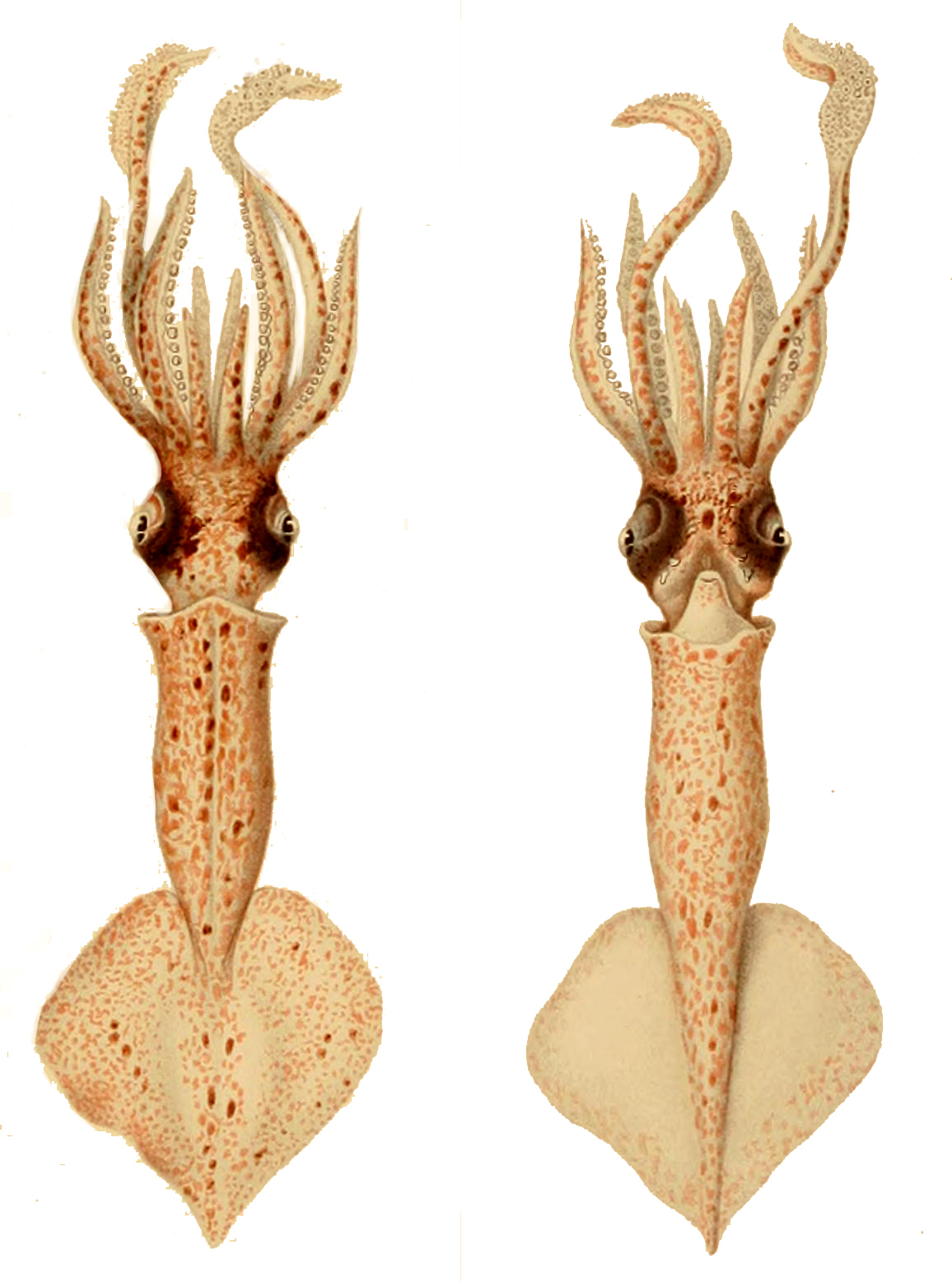
- Brachioteuthis picta

Conservation status
- Least Concern (IUCN 3.1)

Scientific classification
- Kingdom: Animalia
- Phylum: Mollusca
- Class: Cephalopoda
- Order: Oegopsida
- Family: Brachioteuthidae
- Genus: Brachioteuthis
- Species: B. picta

Binomial name
- Brachioteuthis picta Chun, 1910

= Brachioteuthis picta =

Species of Cephalopoda

Brachioteuthis picta is a species of squid in the family Brachioteuthidae.
