= Brachioteuthis behnii =

Conservation status
- Data Deficient (IUCN 3.1)

Scientific classification
- Kingdom: Animalia
- Phylum: Mollusca
- Class: Cephalopoda
- Order: Oegopsida
- Family: Brachioteuthidae
- Genus: Brachioteuthis
- Species: B. behnii

Binomial name
- Brachioteuthis behnii (Steenstrup, 1882)

Synonyms
- Tracheloteuthis behnii Steenstrup, 1882; Entomopsis clouei Rochebrune, 1884; Verrilliola gracilis Pfeffer, 1884

Species of Cephalopoda

Brachioteuthis behnii is a species of squid in the family Brachioteuthidae. The International Union for Conservation of Nature has assessed it as "data deficient" because of uncertainty about its taxonomic validity.

Brachioteuthis behnii is a widespread deep water squid reported from the equatorial Atlantic and equatorial and central waters of the Indo-Pacific.
