= Brachioteuthis bowmani =

Scientific classification
- Domain: Eukaryota
- Kingdom: Animalia
- Phylum: Mollusca
- Class: Cephalopoda
- Order: Oegopsida
- Family: Brachioteuthidae
- Genus: Brachioteuthis
- Species: B. bowmani

Binomial name
- Brachioteuthis bowmani Russell, 1909

Species of Cephalopoda

Brachioteuthis bowmani is a species of squid in the family Brachioteuthidae.
