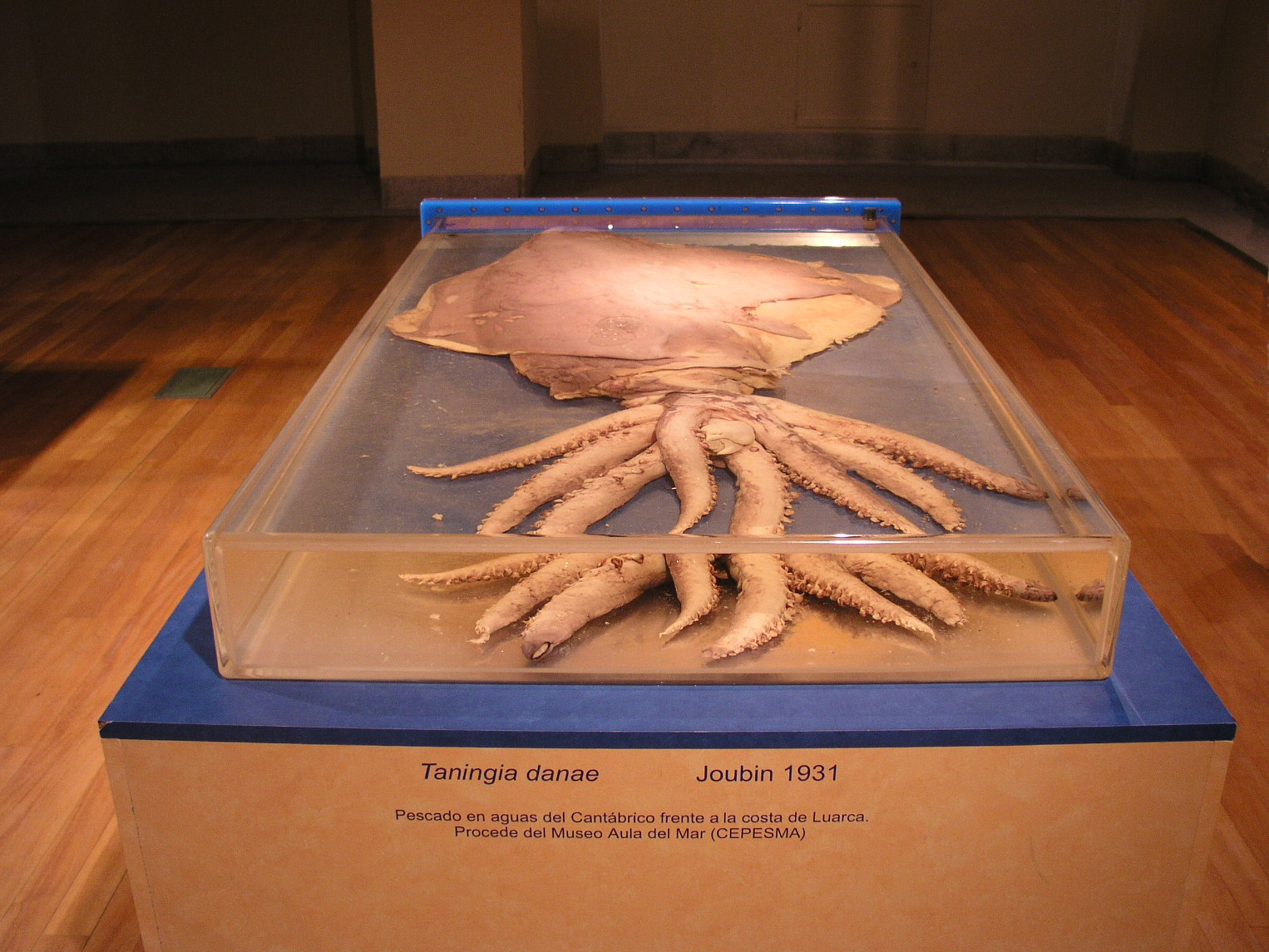
- Taningia danae

Scientific classification
- Kingdom: Animalia
- Phylum: Mollusca
- Class: Cephalopoda
- Order: Oegopsida
- Superfamily: Octopoteuthoidea
- Family: Octopoteuthidae; Berry, 1912

Type genus
- Octopoteuthis Rüppell, 1844

Synonyms
- Octopoteuthoidea S. S. Berry, 1912

= Octopoteuthidae =

Family of squids

The Octopoteuthidae are a family of squid comprising two genera. The family is characterized by tentacles which cease to grow after the paralarval stage which leads to the adult having eight arms; thus, members of this family are commonly named as octopus squids.

== Description ==
Octopoteuthidae is considered to be closely related to the monotypic family Lepidoteuthidae (genus Lepidoteuthis), sometimes being its sister family.

Octopus squids are characterized by a semi-gelatinous body, with very long, broad fins; the fins approach the length of the mantle in adults. These are oval in shape and muscular, with the two fins being fused towards the midline of the mantle. Their namesake feature is the lack of tentacles in adults; paralarvae and young juveniles possess them, but they do not develop after this stage, and so the adults only have eight arms like an octopus; these arms are armed with hooks. They do not have a hectocotylus; rather, they have a "penis" or terminal organ, which is "often greatly enlarged, elongate", extending well beyond the mantle's opening. Photophores are present on the arm-tips, and these are useful in distinguishing the genera.

The family comprises two genera. A 2019 study recovered some additional species and separates Octopoteuthis into four species groups, though further research is needed to confirm this:

- Genus Octopoteuthis (spindle-shaped photophore on all arm tips; smaller bodied)
  - Octopoteuthis danae
  - Octopoteuthis deletron
  - Octopoteuthis fenestra *
  - Octopoteuthis indica
  - Octopoteuthis laticauda *
  - Octopoteuthis leviuncus *
  - Octopoteuthis longiptera (nomen dubium)
  - Octopoteuthis megaptera
  - Octopoteuthis nielseni
  - Octopoteuthis rugosa
  - Octopoteuthis sicula, Ruppell's octopus squid
  - Octopoteuthis sp. "IO" *
  - Octopoteuthis sp. "Giant Pacific" *
  - Octopoteuthis sp. "Giant Atlantic" *
- Genus Taningia (large, oval photophore on tip of arm-pair II; larger bodied)
  - Taningia danae, Dana octopus squid
  - Taningia fimbria *
  - Taningia persica (taxon inquirendum)
  - Taningia rubea *
  - Taningia silasii
  - Taningia sp. IV *
  - Taningia sp. V *

Species recovered by the 2019 study is marked by an asterisk (*). These have not yet been accepted by various online taxonomic databases.

== See also ==
- Stubby squid
