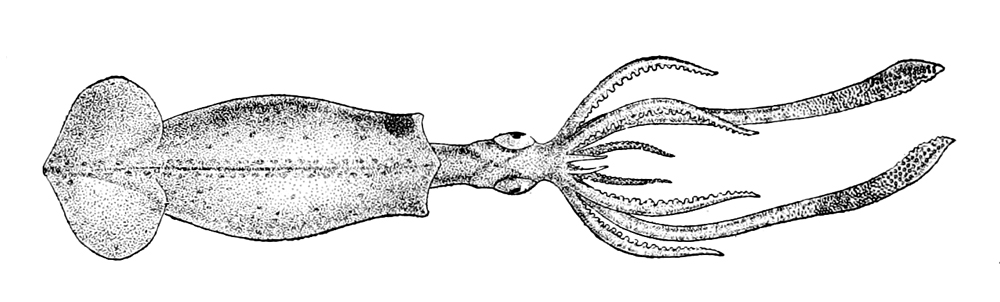
- Brachioteuthis riisei

Scientific classification
- Kingdom: Animalia
- Phylum: Mollusca
- Class: Cephalopoda
- Order: Oegopsida
- Superfamily: Cycloteuthoidea
- Family: Brachioteuthidae; Pfeffer, 1908b

Genera
- Brachioteuthis; Slosarczykovia

= Brachioteuthidae =

Family of squids

Brachioteuthidae is a family of squid containing two genera and around seven species. They are muscular, but rather thin squids with a ML up to ~20 cm. The tentacle club is unique in this family in that the dactylus is normal (usually 3-4 sucker series), while the manus is greatly expanded with numerous small suckers on stalks. Many species show very little differentiation between the carpus, manus, and the dactylus.

== Taxonomy ==
The family Brachioteuthidae was fully described by Pfeffer in 1908, with its first species, Brachioteuthis beanii, originally identified by A.E. Verrill in 1881 from two specimens collected off the coast of Martha's Vineyard. However, the species was described based on a heavily damaged individual, which made its classification more challenging. Initially, B. beanii was considered a potential member of the family Chiroteuthidae due to the neck-like feature observed in its paralarvae, but further examination revealed several key differences that warranted its placement in Brachioteuthidae instead.

In 1882, Steenstrup described a new genus, Tracheloteuthis (later synonymized with Brachioteuthis), along with two new species: T. riisei (=B. riisei) and T. behnii (=B. behnii). These species were primarily based on paralarval forms, with very little morphological detail provided, and additional research was needed, particularly to confirm the validity of B. behnii.

In 1908, another species, B. bowmani, was discovered by E.S. Russel. This species, known only from a single female specimen measuring about 61 mm in mantle length from the northeast Atlantic, remains poorly understood due to the loss of the type specimen, limiting further study of its validity.

In 1910, Carl Chun described B. picta, based on a nearly perfect mature specimen collected in the Benguela Current off the coast of Africa. Chun's description highlighted several distinguishing features, including a long, bluntly pointed mantle, fins about half the length of the mantle, a head slightly larger than the mantle, and a wide club with a curved apex, which set B. picta apart from other species in the genus.

The 21st century saw further advancements in Brachioteuthis taxonomy, with Marek Lipinski's 2001 description of B. linkovskyi and the new genus Slosarczykovia with the species (S. circumantarctica). B. linkovskyi was described from a single male specimen, notable for its reticulate, wart-covered mantle (with no warts on the head, fins, or arms), fins extending into the tail, and relatively short arms. The species also featured suckers with 9-12 teeth on each arm, and a lack of sexual `modification in arms IV, including no hectocotylus. The largest suckers on the manus had up to 14 long, sharp teeth, and those on the proximal dactylus were 2.5–4 times larger than those on the manus.

Slosarczykovia, a new genus described in the same work, was distinguished by the presence of a fibrous net in both males and females, a weakly differentiated suckered club, and the absence of a carpal fixing apparatus. The largest suckers on the proximal manus were about 33% larger than those on the proximal dactylus.

Despite a lack of significant morphological similarities, Discoteuthidae is considered the sister group to Brachioteuthidae, a relationship that remains somewhat enigmatic, given the few shared traits between the two families.

== Species ==
- Genus Brachioteuthis
  - Brachioteuthis beanii
  - Brachioteuthis behnii *
  - Brachioteuthis bowmani *
  - Brachioteuthis picta, *
  - Brachioteuthis riisei, *
  - Brachioteuthis linkovskyi, *
- Genus Slosarczykovia
  - Slosarczykovia circumantarctica

The species listed above with an asterisk (*) is questionable and needs further study to determine if it is a valid species or a synonym.

== Trophic ecology ==
Little is known about the exact diets of many brachioteuthid species due to the unstable taxonomy of the family. Many species are often misidentified, and published in scientific literature as the wrong species. Brachioteuthids in general are primarily predated on by large sea mammals, sea birds, large fish, and other invertebrates (including shrimp and other squid). Less knowledge is available regarding individual species diets. Slosarczykovia is known to eat krill, copepods, and amphipods; while B. beanii was found to eat sternoptychid and myctophid fishes)

== Reproduction ==
Similar to other information, reproduction in individual species is not well understood. However, in 1996, Clyde Roper and Mike Vecchione discussed paired behaviour in B. beanii detected in the north Atlantic through live sightings. The videos showed one squid grasping the other by the posterior mantle with its arm crown. There were brief periods where the grasped squid would bend its head, and vigorously moved its arms and body around the head and mantle of the grasping squid.
