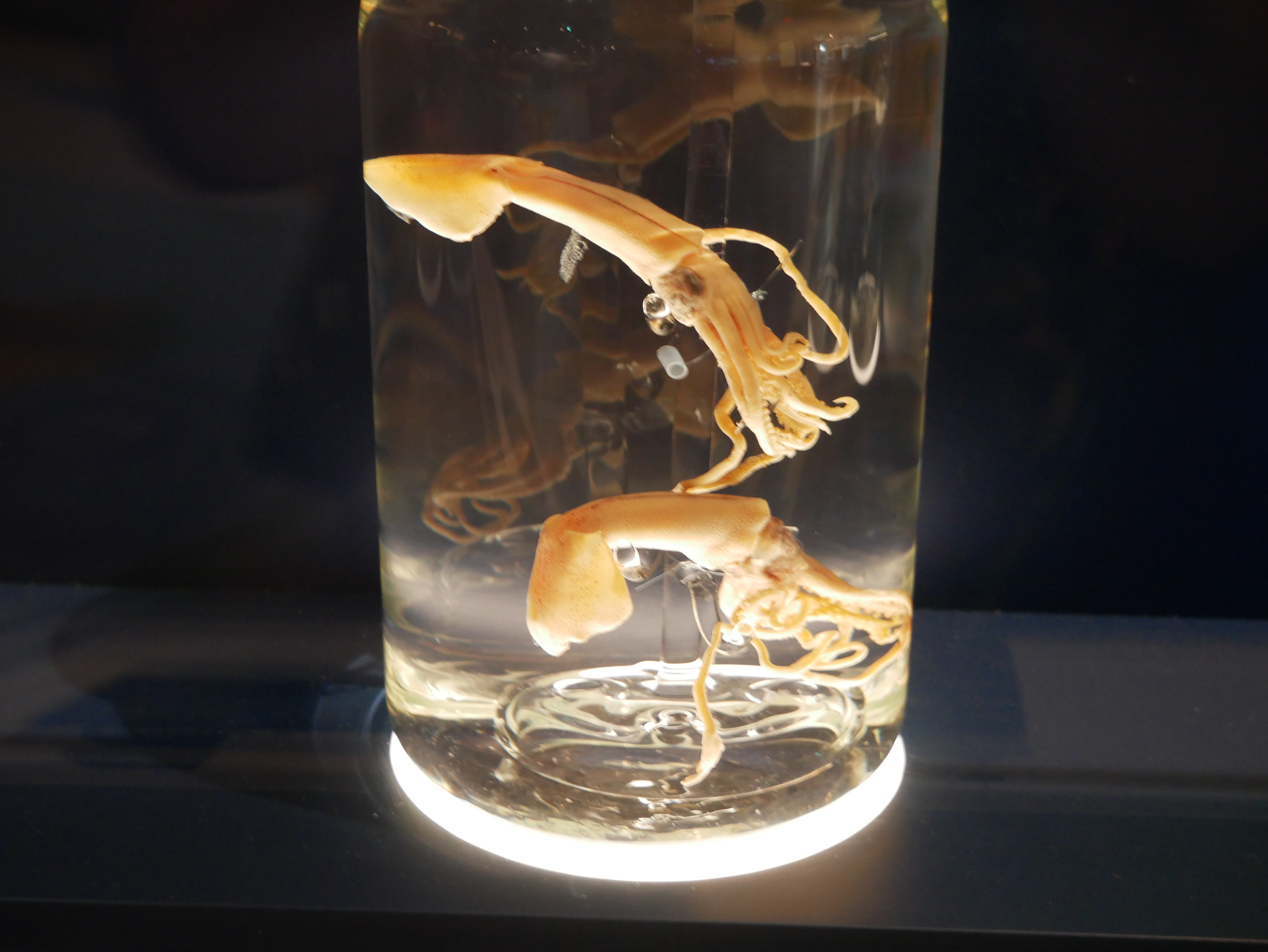
- Brachioteuthis beanii preserved specimens

Conservation status
- Least Concern (IUCN 3.1)

Scientific classification
- Kingdom: Animalia
- Phylum: Mollusca
- Class: Cephalopoda
- Order: Oegopsida
- Family: Brachioteuthidae
- Genus: Brachioteuthis
- Species: B. beanii

Binomial name
- Brachioteuthis beanii Verrill, 1881

= Brachioteuthis beanii =

Species of squid

Brachioteuthis beanii is a species of squid in the family Brachioteuthidae that lives in pelagic environments. Its young are 1.2 mm (0.047 in) in length.

== Distribution and habitat ==
Its range is in the Western Atlantic, near Canada and the United States. It lives at depths of 0 to 860 meters, with young hanging out by the surface from 0 to 200 meters deep, and individuals having a mating behavior 5 to 60 meters above the ocean floor.

== Conservation ==
Brachioteuthis beanii has no specific threats, and inhabits a wide range in areas where human impact is low. It is considered as "Least Concern" by the IUCN Red List.
