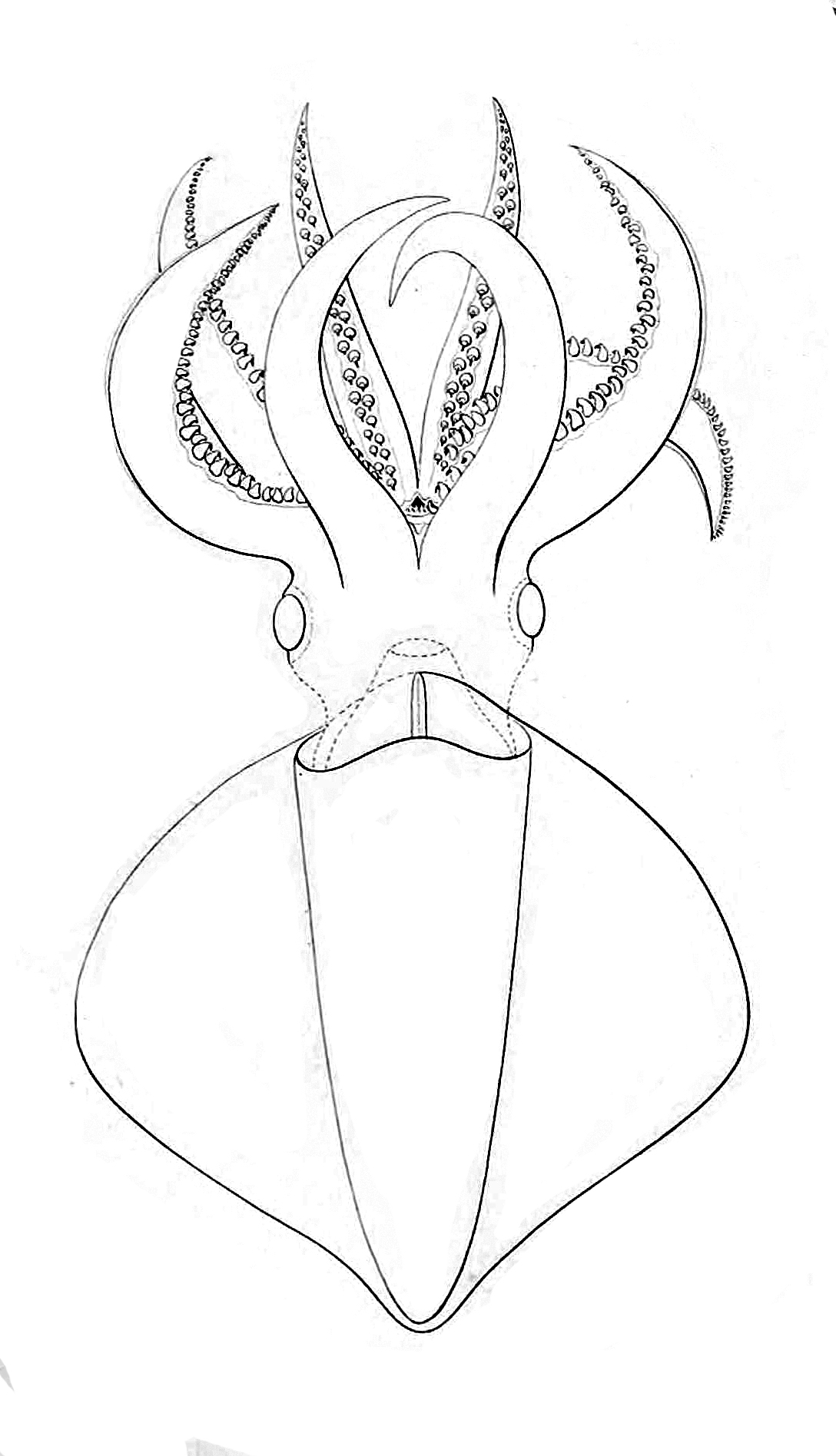
- Ventral view of Taningia danae

Scientific classification
- Kingdom: Animalia
- Phylum: Mollusca
- Class: Cephalopoda
- Order: Oegopsida
- Family: Octopoteuthidae
- Genus: Taningia; Joubin, 1931

Type species
- Taningia danae Joubin, 1931

Species
- See text

Synonyms
- Cucioteuthus? Steenstrup 1882; Cucioteuthis? Joubin, 1898

= Taningia =

Genus of squids

Taningia is a genus of squid, one of the two referred to as octopus squid (family Octopoteuthidae), the other being Octopoteuthis, its sister genus. Both Octopoteuthis and Taningia are characterized by their lack of tentacles for the majority of their life cycle, which led to their common name.

== Classification ==
This genus is named after Danish fisheries biologist Åge Vedel Tåning (1890-1958).

Taningia is separated from Octopoteuthis by adults possessing a large photophore on the tips of arm pair II (second pair from the dorsal), which are the only known photophores on the body along with the ink sac organ (Octopoteuthis has photophores on each arm-tip and spread around its body). The photophores, around the size of lemons, possesses eyelid-like skin flaps which conceal the light organs when needed. The genus reaches 1.5 m (4 ft 11 in) in mantle length (ML), though 1.65 m (5 ft 5 in) has also been reported. This genus possesses two rows of arm hooks on each arm pair, which develop after 5 mm (0.20 in) ML; a single photophore may also develop on the ink sac at this size. The paralarvae have robust tentacular stalks; these disappear at 38 mm (1.5 in) ML, leaving the squid with eight arms.

Additional diagnostic characters include arms being 25-58% of ML, with arm pair II being the shortest, each arm having a single broad buccal connective (membrane connecting the arm to the mass of the mouth), and the mantle cartilage being broad, and blunt towards the head.

Traditionally, this genus is considered to be monotypic, with only Taningia danae as a valid species. T. persica was named from a paralarval specimen in 1923, and it is currently considered a species inquirenda synonymous with T. danae due to the uncertain identity of the holotype, and is ruled by the International Code of Zoological Nomenclature (ICZN) in 1994 that T. danae should be given precedence over T. persica after a 1992 petition. A 2019 thesis recovered more species in this genus, but these are nomina nuda and have not yet been accepted by various online taxonomic databases.

The two accepted species in the genus includes the following:

- Taningia danae Joubin, 1931, Dana octopus squid: holotype from Atlantic, semi-cosmopolitan
- Taningia silasii Sajikumar & Sasikumar in Sajikumar et al., 2025, Indian Octopus Squid: holotype from the southeastern Arabian Sea
Taningia paralarva

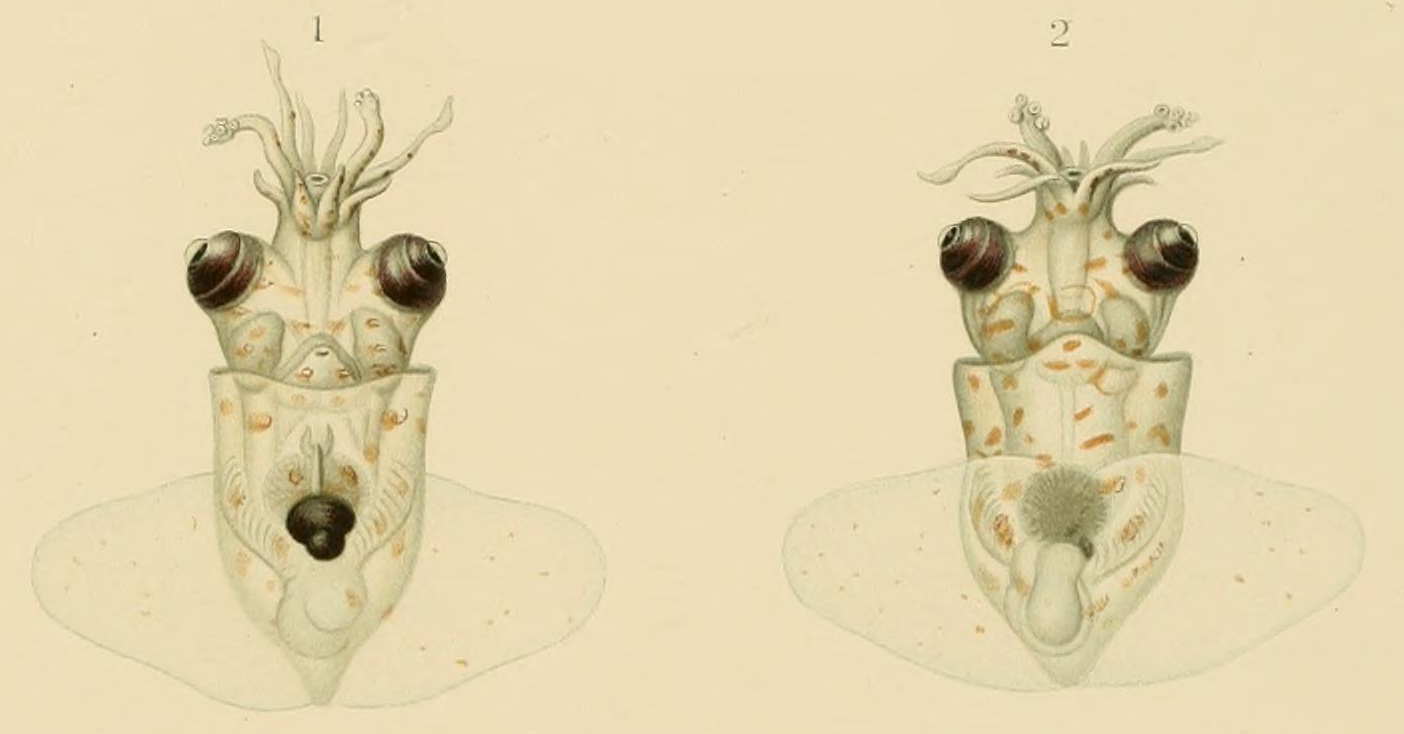
Holotype of Taningia persica, a paralarval specimen. The ink sac is visible through the transparent mantle

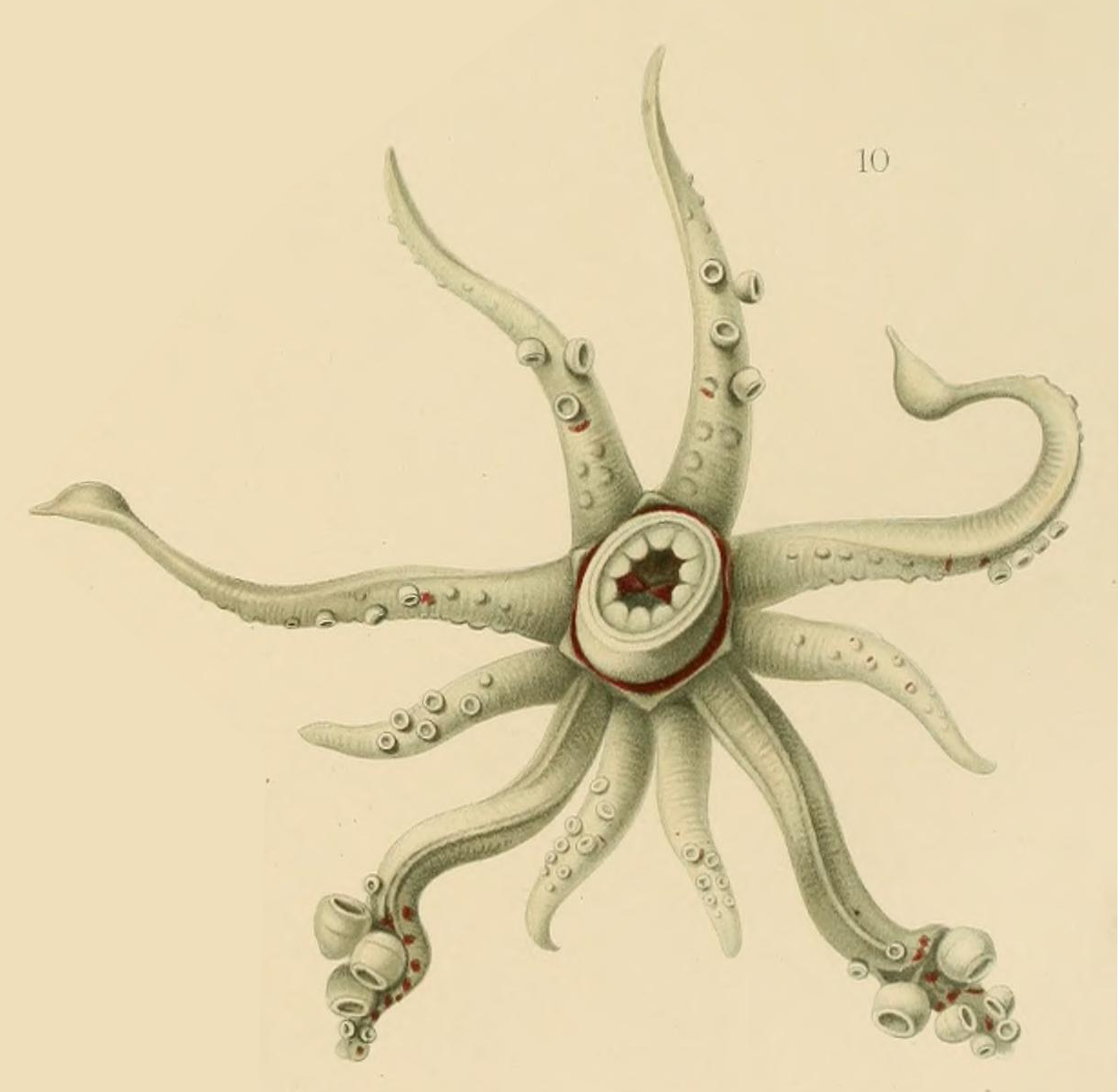
idem, limbs. The pair of tentacles possess large suckers on their tips
