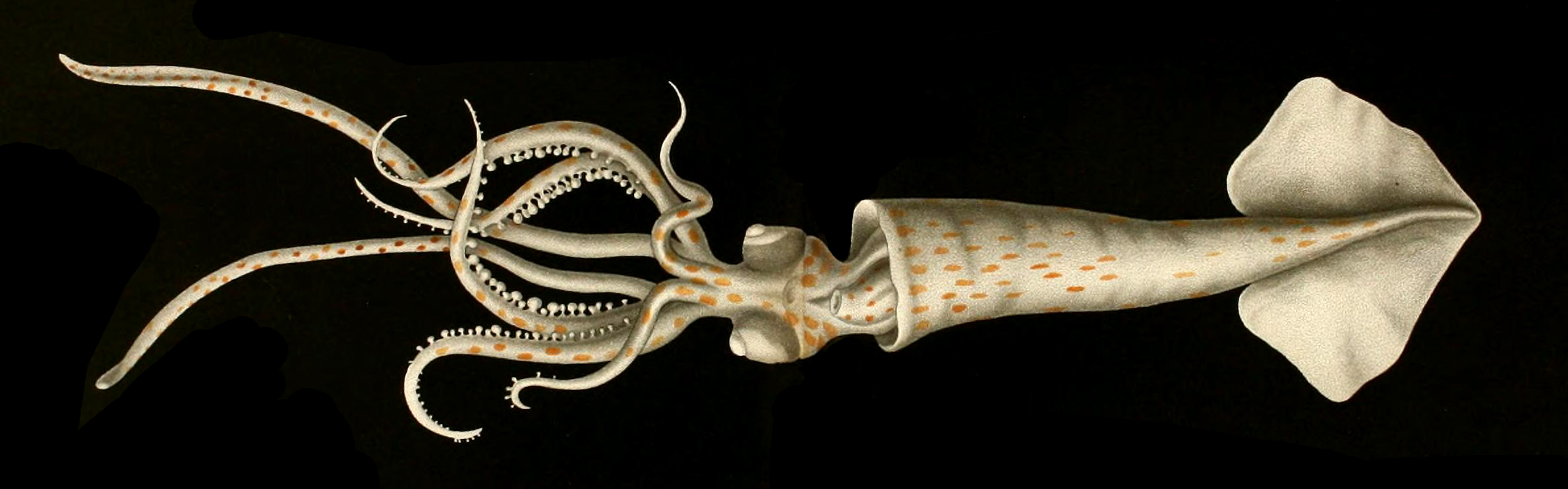

Conservation status
- Data Deficient (IUCN 3.1)

Scientific classification
- Kingdom: Animalia
- Phylum: Mollusca
- Class: Cephalopoda
- Order: Oegopsida
- Family: Brachioteuthidae
- Genus: Brachioteuthis
- Species: B. riisei

Binomial name
- Brachioteuthis riisei (Steenstrup, 1882)

Synonyms
- Entomopsis alicei Joubin, 1900; Entomopsis velaini Rochebrune, 1884; Tracheloteuthis riisei Steenstrup, 1882; Verrilliola nympha Pfeffer, 1884

= Brachioteuthis riisei =

Species of squid

Brachioteuthis riisei is a species of squid in the family Brachioteuthidae.

== Description ==
This is a small species. It is almost colourless except for small chromatophores scarcely distributed. It has a long, thin, cylindrical mantle which grows to from 10 to 17 cm in length. The fin is approximately 35–50% of the length of the mantle. It has weak muscles, yet is nektonic.

=== Larval stage ===
The neck of the larva is long. Their arms have two rows of suckers, with the having multiple rows of smaller suckers in the tentacular club at the proximal hub.

== Distribution ==
This species is widely distributed and is native to many parts of the Atlantic and Pacific Oceans, and the Mediterranean and Black Seas. Except within the boreal Pacific Ocean, this is likely a cosmopolitan species.

== Habitat and biology ==
Young animals live in the epi-mesopelagic zone, with adults occurring in the bathypelagic zone. Brachioteuthis riisei is an oceanic species which can be found over a wide range of depths from the surface to 3,000 m depth. Juvenile animals occur throughout the year which suggests that this species has an extended spawning season, although the juveniles reach peak abundance between May and August and in February in the North Atlantic while the peaks in the Mediterranean and off Northwest Africa are from April to July, in September, and from December to February. Brachioteuthis riisei is preyed upon by a range of marine mammals including Cuvier's beaked whale (Ziphius cavirostris) and striped dolphin (Stenella coeruleoalba), as well as by fish, for example the blue shark (Prionace glauca) and, in the Azores, the swordfish (Xiphias gladius), as well as by the giant red shrimp (Aristaeomorpha foliacea) in the Sicilian Channel.
