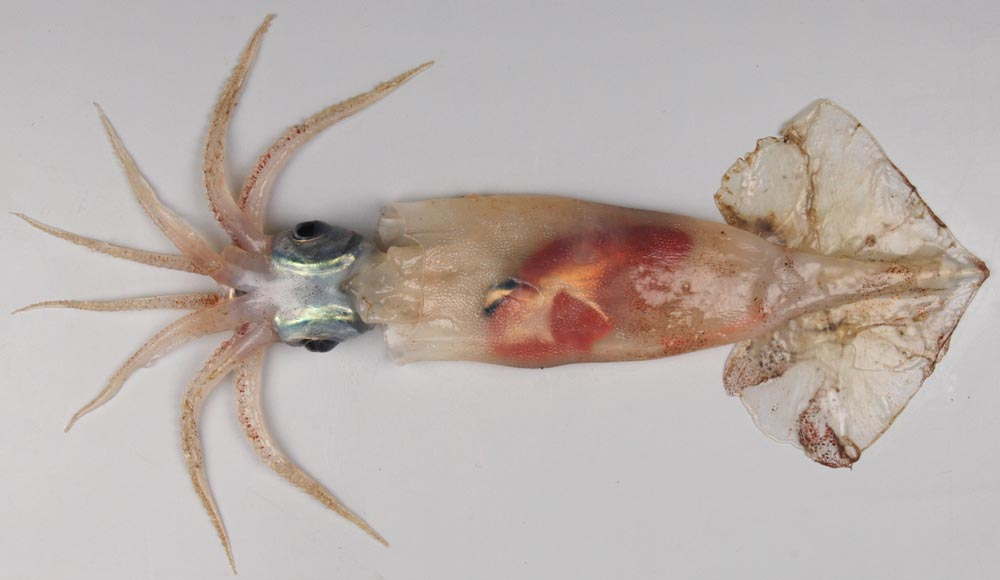

Conservation status
- Least Concern (IUCN 3.1)

Scientific classification
- Kingdom: Animalia
- Phylum: Mollusca
- Class: Cephalopoda
- Order: Oegopsida
- Family: Brachioteuthidae
- Genus: Slosarczykovia; Lipinski, 2001
- Species: S. circumantarctica

Binomial name
- Slosarczykovia circumantarctica Lipinski, 2001

= Slosarczykovia =

Genus of squids

Slosarczykovia is a monotypic genus of squid, its sole representative being Slosarczykovia circumantarctica. Slosarczykovia is placed in the family Brachioteuthidae.

Slosarczykovia circumantarctica is a relatively large species of squid attaining a mantle length of 170 mm, the mantle having a long and slender form with rhomboid shaped fins placed posteriorly. The suckers on the arms are very variable some completely lacking in teeth, others with few teeth and yet others with many teeth. The tentacles have the largest suckers running from the proximal manus and these are about three quarters in diameter of largest sucker from proximal dactylus. The suckers on the tentacular club are weakly differentiated. There is no carpal locking mechanism and there are 13 small carpal suckers which form a row along the dorsal margin of the manus. In squid with a mantle length of greater than 60mm the mantle, fins, head and arms are covered in a fibrous, net like covering of the integument. There is no hectocotylus on the males.

Slosarczykovia circumantarctica was described from a type specimen collected off Wilkes Land, Antarctica and it is thought to have a distribution throughout the seas around Antarctica. It is one of the most common species of squid in Antarctic waters but little is known of the biology of this pelagic species. It is not currently fished for.

The generic name Slosarczykovia honours was derived from the surname of the late Dr Wieslaw Slósarczyk, who was responsible for collecting almost all the specimens used to describe the species while the specific name circumantarctica refers to the circumpolar distribution of the species in the Southern Ocean.
