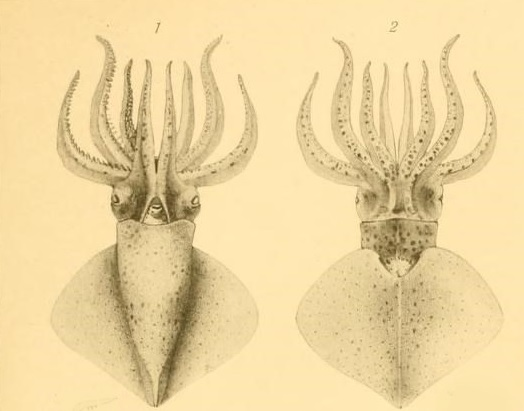
- Octopoteuthis sicula

Scientific classification
- Kingdom: Animalia
- Phylum: Mollusca
- Class: Cephalopoda
- Order: Oegopsida
- Family: Octopoteuthidae
- Genus: Octopoteuthis; Rüppell, 1844

Type species
- Octopoteuthis sicula Rüppell, 1844

Species
- see text

Synonyms
- Octopodoteuthis Krohn, 1845; Octopodoteuthopsis Pfeffer, 1912; Verania Krohn, 1847

= Octopoteuthis =

Genus of squids

Octopoteuthis is a genus of squid, one of the two referred to as octopus squid (family Octopoteuthidae), the other being Taningia, its sister genus. Both Octopoteuthis and Taningia are characterized by their lack of tentacles for the majority of their life cycle, which led to their common name.

== Classification ==
This genus is separated from Taningia by adults possessing spindle-shaped photophores on the tips of all 8 arms (as opposed to a globular pair on a single arm pair in Taningia); the presence of additional photophores embedded in the mantle, head, and arms (the location and sizes of which vary among the species); and a smaller adult size, with mantle lengths (ML) of up to 500 mm (20 in), but typically not exceeding 200 mm (7.9 in). This genus possesses two rows of arm hooks on each arm pair, which may already be present at 2.5 mm ML. The paralarvae of this genus possess "weak", gelatinous tentacle stalks, the tentacles themselves are lost at about 12 mm (0.47 in) ML. Paired photophores may be present on the ink sac at 15 mm (0.59 in) ML.

The species limits of the genus are in need of further research; for example, some authorities have stated that the Mediterranean species Octopoteuthis sicula is apparently the senior synonym of Octopoteuthis danae and that it is very closely related to, or possibly conspecific with, Octopoteuthis megaptera.

The following species are recognised by the World Register of Marine Species:

- Octopoteuthis danae Joubin, 1931
- Octopoteuthis deletron Young, 1972
- Octopoteuthis indica Naef, 1923
- Octopoteuthis longiptera * Akimushkin, 1963
- Octopoteuthis megaptera (Verrill, 1885)
- Octopoteuthis nielseni Robson, 1948
- Octopoteuthis rugosa Clarke, 1980
- Octopoteuthis sicula Rüppell, 1844, Ruppell's octopus squid

Species marked with an asterisk (*) is a nomen dubium and may not be a valid taxon

Additional species were recovered by a 2019 study, but they have not been corroborated by WoRMS or SeaLifeBase. The study also separates Octopoteuthis into 4 species groups. These species recovered in the study are:

- Octopoteuthis fenestra
- Octopoteuthis laticauda
- Octopoteuthis leviuncus
- Octopoteuthis sp. "IO"
- Octopoteuthis sp. "Giant Pacific"
- Octopoteuthis sp. "Giant Atlantic"
