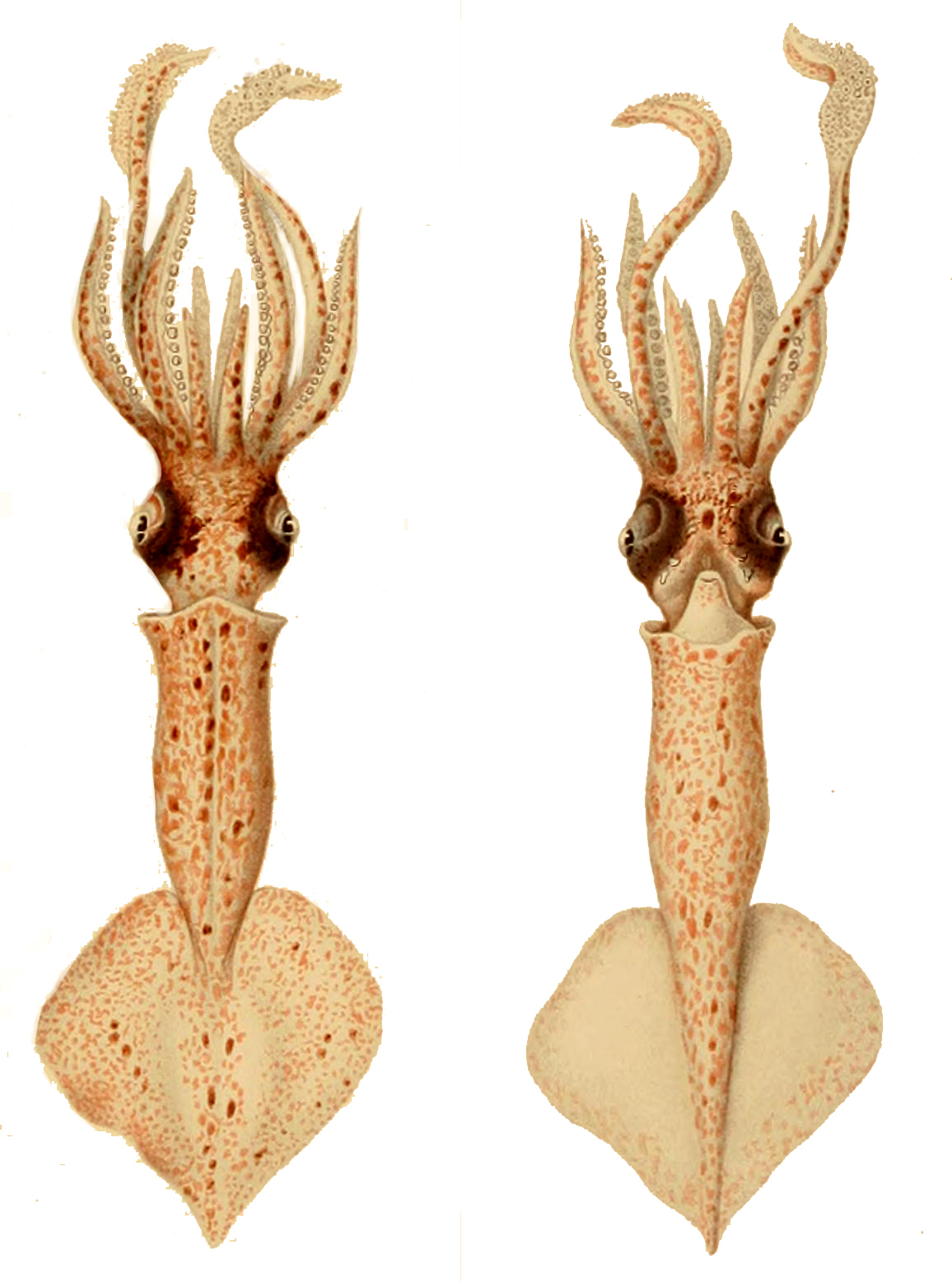
- Brachioteuthis picta

Scientific classification
- Kingdom: Animalia
- Phylum: Mollusca
- Class: Cephalopoda
- Order: Oegopsida
- Family: Brachioteuthidae
- Genus: Brachioteuthis; Verrill, 1881

Type species
- Brachioteuthis beanii Verrill, 1881

Species
- Brachioteuthis beanii Brachioteuthis behnii Brachioteuthis bowmani Brachioteuthis linkovskyi Brachioteuthis picta Brachioteuthis riisei

Synonyms
- Entomopsis Rochebrune, 1884; Tracheloteuthis Steenstrup, 1882; Verrilliola Pfeffer, 1884

= Brachioteuthis =

Genus of squids

Brachioteuthis is a genus of squid comprising six species which are circumglobally distributed. Members of this genus have a generally small (6-14 cm) mantle length.

== Morphology ==
Adult Brachioteuthids are often characterized as having a rhomboidal or heart-shaped fin, a long slender, and muscular mantle hat is supported by a gladius. The funnel locking cartilage in Brachioteuthis is a simple, straight groove. The arms of all brachioteuthids have biserial suckers, with the males typically displaying a hectocotylus on arms IV. The tentacle club in Brachioteuthis is substantially different than other oegopsid squids’. The proximal manus contains numerous transverse rows of small, stalked suckers, which become larger suckers towards the distal manus. The dactylus begins with typically four suckers and progresses to three suckers down the remainder of the club before reaching the terminal pad. The terminal pad contains an empty patch that is surrounded by small sessile suckers. The sections of the club are typically poorly differentiated. In mature males there are typically small tubercles on the mantle, and in some species, the tubercles are connected or covered by a reticulated net.

Paralarval individuals display their own set of unique characteristics that separate them from adults. They can be recognized by the paddle-shaped fins; a long, slender fluid-filled neck with no arm crown; and laterally directed eyes.

== Species ==
- Brachioteuthis beanii, type locality: 39°57'N, 69°19'W and 39°56'N, 69°24'W (Atlantic Ocean)
- Brachioteuthis behnii*, Type locality - likely in the Indian Ocean near Papua New Guinea
- Brachioteuthis bowmani*, Type locality: Scotland
- Brachioteuthis picta*, Type locality: 5°6'N, 9°58'E
- Brachioteuthis riisei*, This squid is potentially part of a species complex. The type locality is: 34°40'S, 7°W (Atlantic Ocean)
- Brachioteuthis linkovskyi,* The type locality is 600 miles SE of Montevideo.

The species listed above with an asterisk (*) are questionable and need further study to determine if they are a valid species or a synonym.

== Historical Resume ==
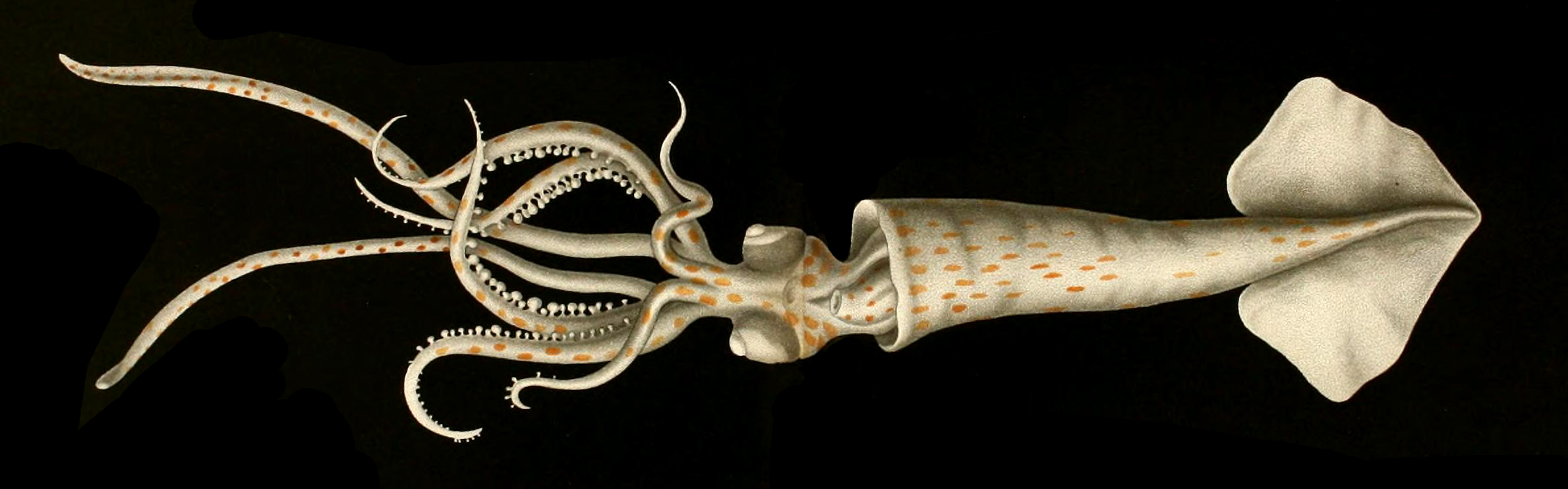
Brachioteuthis riisei

The first species described in the family was Brachioteuthis beanii. Verrill suggested that the species is allied to Chiroteuthis, but different in having a simple, long-ovate lateral connective cartilage of the siphon and corresponding cartilages in the mantle; rhomboidal fins; a pen with a simple, linear anterior region that expands into a more broad, lanceolate region; and a tentacle club with a spoon like cavity at the tip. In 1882, Steenstrup established a second genus, Tracheloteuthis (=Brachioteuthis) and described two species in the new genus, T. riisei and T. behni. He placed this genus among the Ommastrephidae. Both species were described from very little information and uninformative characters including fin and arm lengths in relation to the other arms and mantle.
