= Octopoteuthis deletron =

Conservation status
- Data Deficient (IUCN 3.1)

Scientific classification
- Kingdom: Animalia
- Phylum: Mollusca
- Class: Cephalopoda
- Order: Oegopsida
- Family: Octopoteuthidae
- Genus: Octopoteuthis
- Species: O. deletron

Binomial name
- Octopoteuthis deletron Young, 1972

Species of squid

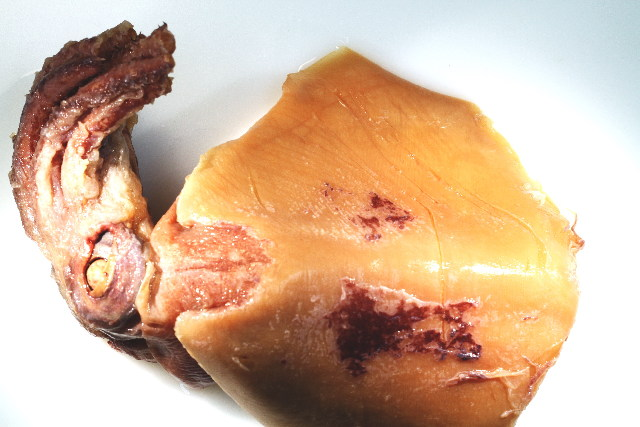
Octopoteuthis deletron

Octopoteuthis deletron is a species of squid in the genus Octopoteuthis of the family Octopoteuthidae. They belong to the pelagic squids of order Oegopsida. Found at depths of 400 to 800 m (1,300 to 2,600 ft) in the Pacific Ocean, they have been known to grow to 24 cm (9.4 in).

== Biology ==
=== Trophic ecology ===
This species is described as an inactive predator, having a lower metabolism and relying on ambush, though members of this genus are higher in trophic level than glass squids and active hunters like Todaropsis eblanae.

O. deletron has been found to break off its arms as a defense strategy. The squid digs hooks in one of its arms into a predator and jets away, leaving the arm in the predator's skin.

O. deletron are the most common species found in the stomachs of northern elephant seals sampled off the coast of California. It is an important prey item of the giant grenadier. It is also eaten by the enigmatic Perrin's beaked whale (Mesoplodon perrini).

== Reproduction ==
The male O. deletron has a penis, which is unusual among squids. Males find it difficult to detect the sex of other individuals they encounter in the dark depths, so they have adopted a strategy of attaching sperm packets to all individuals they meet. This behavior has earned it the moniker of "bisexual squid".
