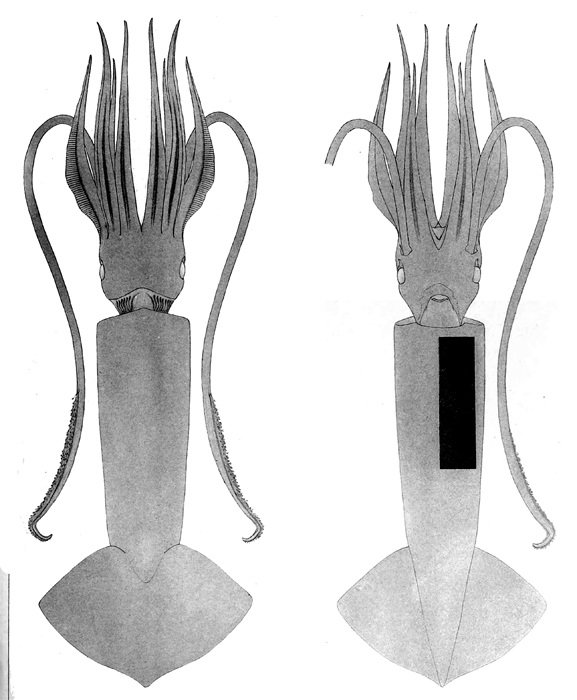
- Pholidoteuthis massyae

Scientific classification
- Domain: Eukaryota
- Kingdom: Animalia
- Phylum: Mollusca
- Class: Cephalopoda
- Order: Oegopsida
- Superfamily: Pholidoteuthoidea; Adam, 1950
- Family: Pholidoteuthidae; Adam, 1950
- Genus: Pholidoteuthis; Adam, 1950

Type species
- Pholidoteuthis massyae (Pfeffer, 1912)

Species
- See text

= Pholidoteuthis =

Genus of squids

Pholidoteuthis is a genus of squid in the monotypic family Pholidoteuthidae, comprising at least two species. The defunct genus Tetronychoteuthis was previously incorporated into Pholidoteuthidae based upon a singular taxon known as Tetronychoteuthis massyae. Following the discovery of Pholidoteuthis boschmai in 1950, T. massaye was placed into Pholidoteuthis, with Tetronoychoteuthis considered a nomen dubium. P. boschmai is now considered a junior synonym of P. massyae.

== Species ==
- Pholidoteuthis adami Voss, 1956
- Pholidoteuthis massyae (Pfeffer, 1912) – coffeebean scaled squid
