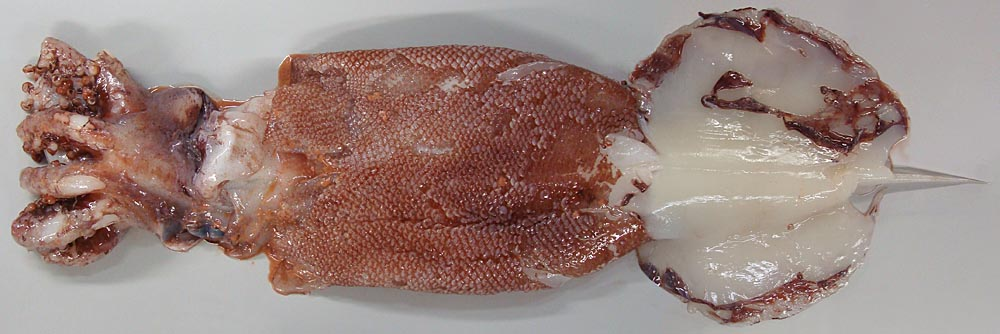
- Female (61.7 cm ML, 4.07 kg weight) from the Chatham Rise off New Zealand
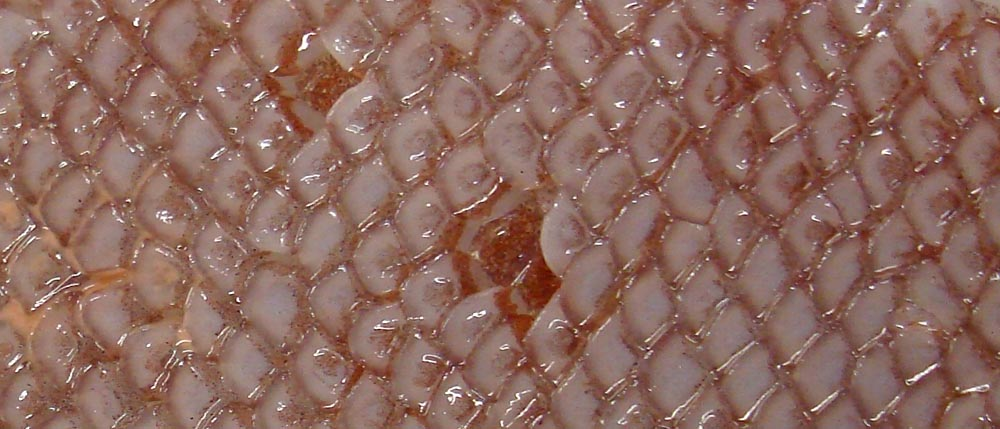
- Closeup of the overlapping dermal scales of the same specimen

Conservation status
- Least Concern (IUCN 3.1)

Scientific classification
- Kingdom: Animalia
- Phylum: Mollusca
- Class: Cephalopoda
- Order: Oegopsida
- Superfamily: Octopoteuthoidea
- Family: Lepidoteuthidae; Pfeffer, 1912
- Genus: Lepidoteuthis; Joubin, 1895
- Species: L. grimaldii

Binomial name
- Lepidoteuthis grimaldii Joubin, 1895

Synonyms
- Enoptroteuthis spinicauda Berry, 1920

= Lepidoteuthis =

Grimaldi scaled squid

Species of squid

Lepidoteuthis grimaldii, also known as the Grimaldi scaled squid, is a large squid growing to 1 m (3 ft 3 in) in mantle length. It is named after the Grimaldi family, reigning house of Monaco. Prince Albert I of Monaco was an amateur teuthologist who pioneered the study of deep sea squids by collecting the 'precious regurgitations' of sperm whales. The Grimaldi scaled squid was first collected from the stomach contents of a sperm whale. It is a widely distributed species in tropical and subtropical areas of the North and South Atlantic, the southern Indian Ocean and the Pacific Ocean, where it has been recorded off Japan and in the west Pacific.

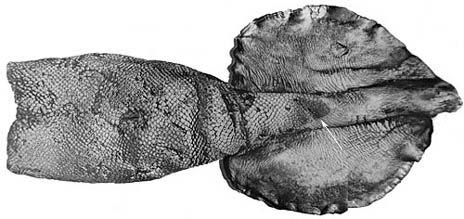
Syntype (86 cm ML)

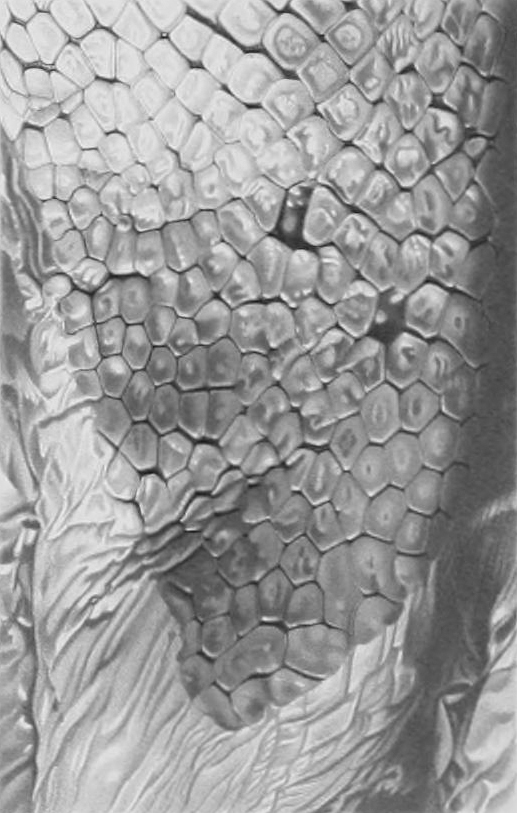
Closeup of the mantle scales

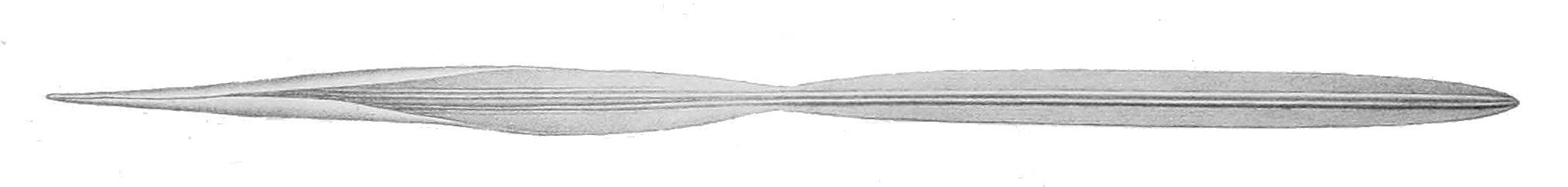
Gladius

== See also ==
- Cephalopod size
