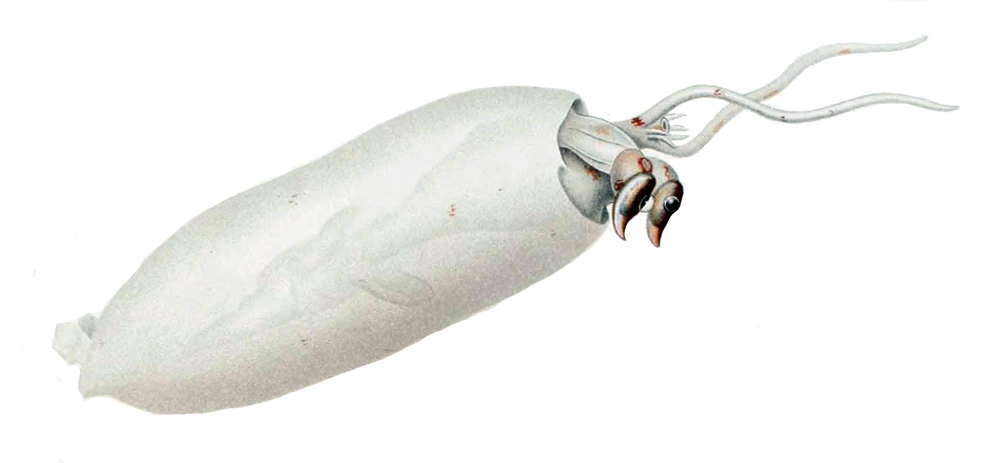
- Sandalops melancholicus

Scientific classification
- Kingdom: Animalia
- Phylum: Mollusca
- Class: Cephalopoda
- Order: Oegopsida
- Family: Cranchiidae
- Subfamily: Taoniinae; Pfeffer, 1912

Type genus
- Taonius Steenstrup, 1861

Genera
- Bathothauma; Egea; Galiteuthis; Helicocranchia; Liguriella; Megalocranchia; Mesonychoteuthis; Sandalops; Taonius; Teuthowenia

Synonyms
- Galiteuthinae Berry, 1912; Teuthoweniinae Grimpe, 1922

= Taoniinae =

Subfamily of squids

Taoniinae is a subfamily containing ten genera of glass squids.

== Description ==
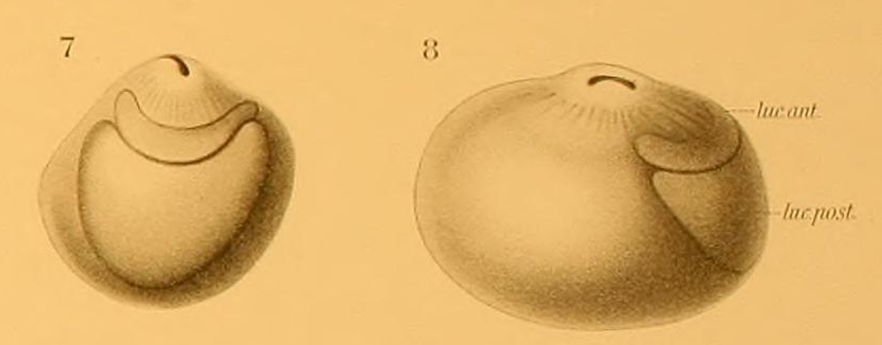
Right eye of T. pellucida.

Unlike Cranchiinae Pfeffer, 1912, the other subfamily within Cranchiidae Prosch, 1847, Taoniinae all lack cartilaginous strips that extend back from the funnel-mantle point of fusion. Their funnels are free laterally, and they have one to three photophores on the eyes. The largest photophore is crescent-shaped for most genera, but it's triangular in Helicocranchia, a semicircle in Bathothauma, and circular in Sandalops. This is in contrast to glass squids in the subfamily Cranchiinae, which have at least four small photophores which are round or oval.

In addition, males lack hectocotyli; these are arms that have evolved to specialize in the storage and transfer of spermatophores to females. Taoniinae are also often larger than Cranchiinae and have darker beaks. Another characteristic is that Taoniinae's caecum, is smaller than its stomach; in Cranchiinae, the caecum is larger than the stomach.

== Taxonomic history and synonyms ==
When Georg Johann Pfeffer circumscribed this subfamily in 1912, he grouped its genera into three tribes:

- Taonius-like Taoniinae
  - Phasmatopsis Rochebrune, 1884 (Note: Nomen dubium according to WoRMS.)
  - Toxeuma Chun, 1906 (Note: Invalid junior homonym of the insect genus Toxeuma Walker, 1833 (in the family Pteromalidae). Renamed to Belonella Lane, 1957, which WoRMS treats as junior synonym of Taonius.)
  - Taonius Steenstrup, 1861
  - Desmoteuthis Verrill, 1881 (Note: Junior synonym of Taonius according to WoRMS.)
  - Megalocranchia Pfeffer, 1884
  - Taonidium Pfeffer, 1900 (Note: Junior synonym of Galitethis according to WoRMS.)
  - Crystalloteuthis Chun, 1906 (Note: Junior synonym of Galitethis according to WoRMS.)
  - Phasmatoteuthion Pfeffer, 1912 (Note: Junior synonym of Galitethis according to WoRMS.)
  - Galiteuthis Joubin, 1898
  - Corynomma Chun, 1906 (Note: Junior synonym of Megalocranchia according to WoRMS.)
- Teuthowenia-like Taoniinae
  - Teuthowenia Chun, 1910
- Bathothauma-like Taoniinae
  - Bathothauma Chun, 1906

Synonyms of Taoniinae include Galiteuthinae Berry, 1912 and Teuthoweniinae Grimpe, 1922. S. Stillman Berry's 1912 circumscription of the subfamily Galiteuthinae only consisted of its type genus Galiteuthis Joubin, 1898. Like Pfeffer's Taoniinae, this was a subfamily within the family Cranchiidae Prosch, 1847. This was in contrast to Louis Joubin's classification, which placed Galiteuthis in a new, distinct family: Cranchionychiae Joubin, 1898. Georg Grimpe's 1922 circumscription of Teuthoweniinae included its type genus Teuthowenia Chun, 1910 as well as Hensenioteuthis Pfeffer, 1900, (Note: Nomen dubium according to WoRMS.) Helicocranchia Massy, 1907, and Sandalops Chun, 1906. He placed the genus Bathothauma Chun, 1906 into a new family, Bathothaumatidae Grimpe, 1922, now just treated as a junior synonym of Cranchiidae. Subsequent research did not pay much heed to Grimpe's taxonomy.

== Phylogeny ==
Below is Nancy A. Voss and Robert S. Voss's 1983 proposal for a phylogeny of the Taoniinae subfamily.

- - - - - - - Bathothauma Chun, 1906
          - Helicocranchia Massy, 1907
      - Sandalops Chun, 1906
  - Liguriella Issel, 1908
- - - - - Mesonychoteuthis Robson, 1925
        - Galiteuthis Joubin, 1898
      - Taonius Steenstrup, 1861
    - - - Teuthowenia Chun, 1910
        - - - - - Megalocranchia Robson, 1925
              - Egea Joubin, 1933

== Genera and species ==
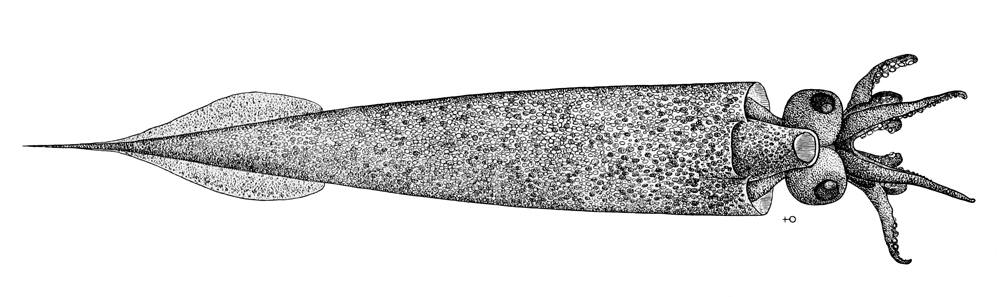
Taonius borealis

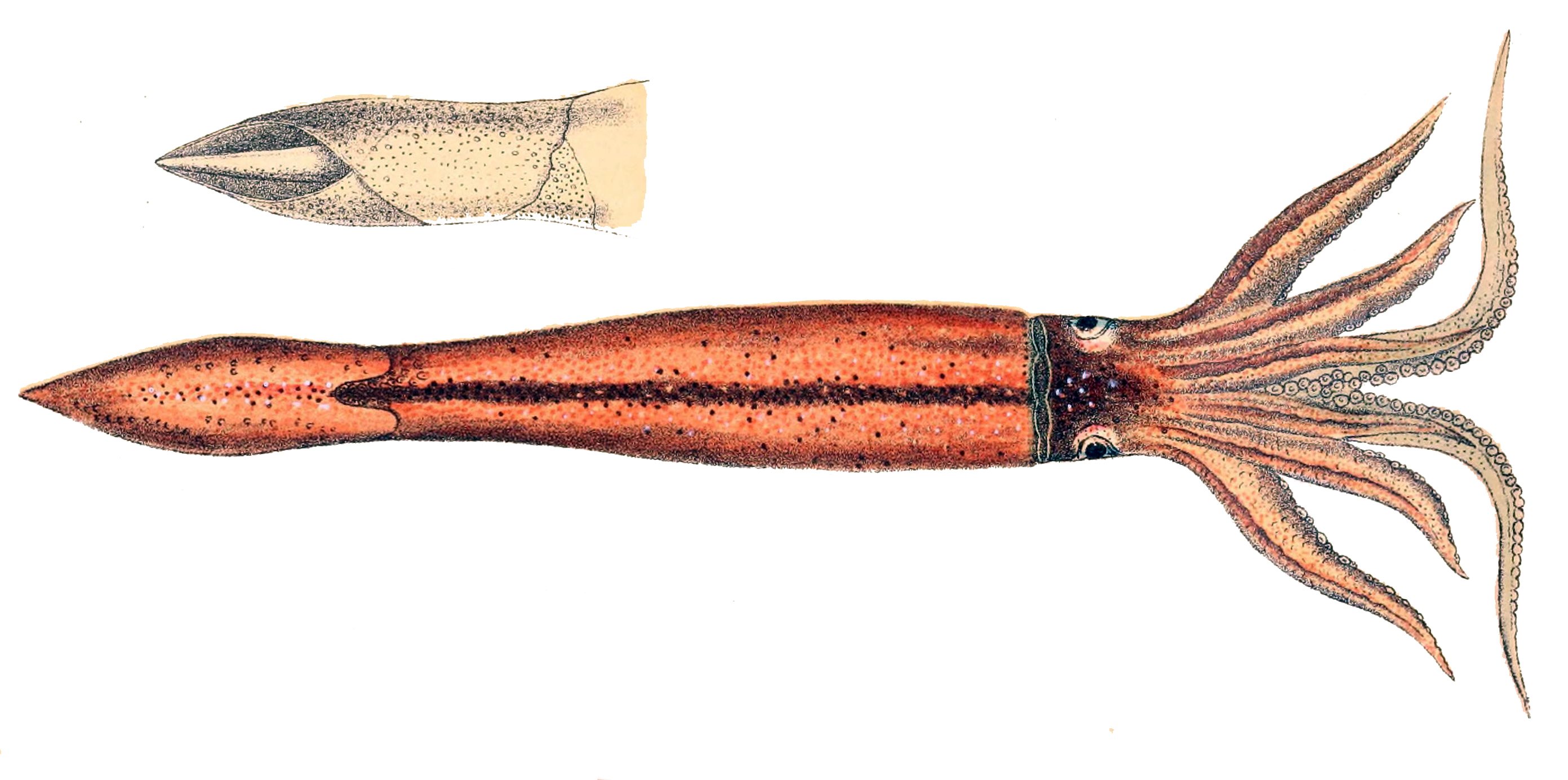
Taonius pavo

As of 2017, the World Register of Marine Species classifies the Taoniinae as containing ten genera; they classify Belonella as a synonym of Taonius following Nancy A. Voss. However, Patrizia Jereb and Clyde F. E. Roper recognize Belonella as a distinct genus from Taonius, although they also note they are frequently synonymized. Jereb and Roper also note Kir Nazimovich Nesis and Takashi Okutani as teuthologists who rejected Voss's synonymization of Belonella. Nesis's classification had Taonius consisting of only the single species T. pavo, and had Belonella consisting of B. belone Chun, 1906, B. borealis Nesis, 1972 and an undescribed species from the Antarctic.

- Genus Bathothauma Chun, 1906
  - Bathothauma lyromma Chun, 1906
- Genus Egea Joubin, 1933
  - Egea inermis Joubin, 1933
- Genus Galiteuthis Joubin, 1898
  - Galiteuthis armata Joubin, 1898, armed cranch squid
  - Galiteuthis glacialis (Chun, 1906)
  - Galiteuthis pacifica (Robson, 1948)
  - Galiteuthis phyllura Berry, 1911
  - Galiteuthis suhmi (Hoyle, 1886)
- Genus Helicocranchia Massy, 1907
  - Helicocranchia joubini (Voss, 1962)
  - Helicocranchia papillata (Voss, 1960)
  - Helicocranchia pfefferi Massy, 1907
- Genus Liguriella Issel, 1908
  - Liguriella podophthalma Issel, 1908
- Genus Megalocranchia Pfeffer, 1884
  - Megalocranchia fisheri (Berry, 1909)
  - Megalocranchia maxima Pfeffer, 1884
  - Megalocranchia oceanica (Voss, 1960)
- Genus Mesonychoteuthis Robson, 1925
  - Mesonychoteuthis hamiltoni, colossal squid or Antarctic cranch squid
- Genus Sandalops Chun, 1906
  - Sandalops melancholicus Chun, 1906, sandal-eyed squid
- Genus Taonius Steenstrup, 1861
  - Taonius borealis (Nesis, 1972)
  - Taonius pavo (Lesueur, 1821)
  - Taonius belone (Chun, 1906)
- Genus Teuthowenia Chun, 1910
  - Teuthowenia maculata (Leach, 1817)
  - Teuthowenia megalops (Prosch, 1849), Atlantic cranch squid
  - Teuthowenia pellucida (Chun, 1910), googly-eyed glass squid
