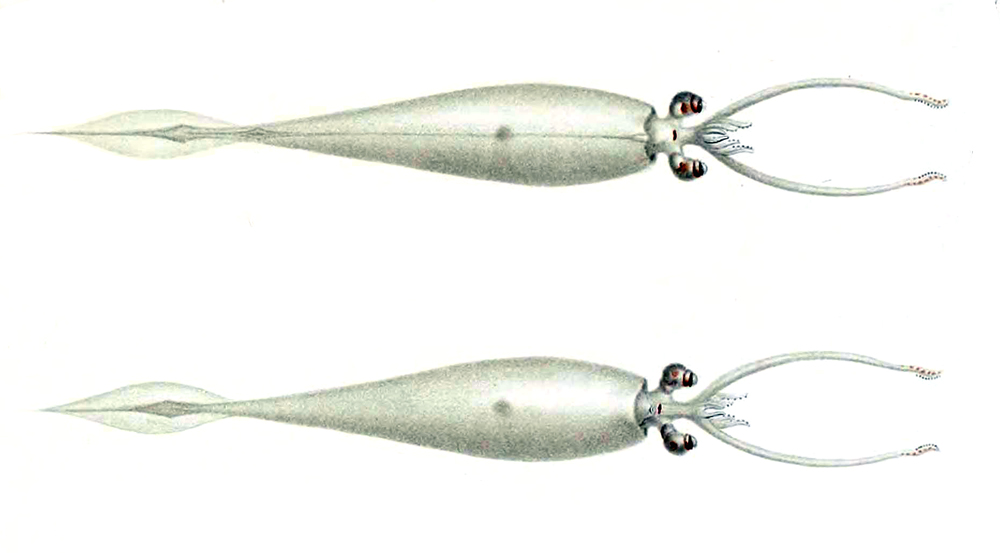

Conservation status
- Least Concern (IUCN 3.1)

Scientific classification
- Domain: Eukaryota
- Kingdom: Animalia
- Phylum: Mollusca
- Class: Cephalopoda
- Order: Oegopsida
- Family: Cranchiidae
- Subfamily: Taoniinae
- Genus: Taonius
- Species: T. belone

Binomial name
- Taonius belone (Chun, 1906)

Synonyms
- Belonella (pacifica) pacifica Nesis, 1972; Belonella belone (Chun, 1906); Toxeuma belone Chun, 1906

= Taonius belone =

Species of squid

Taonius belone is a glass squid belonging to the genus Taonius from the family Cranchiidae. It occurs in the northern subtropical and in the tropical or equatorial waters of the Pacific Ocean and the Indian Ocean.

== Description ==
Taonius belone is a large species of glass squid, which reaches a mantle length of up to 66 cm, the mantle being rather leathery in texture.

It has short arms which have narrow protective membranes which widen near the arm bases where they join up to create an internal umbrella. Each arm has two rows of suckers which become denser towards the tips; there are at least 21 pairs of suckers on each arm, with the largest suckers around the 8th pair. The largest suckers each have 20–30 teeth, wide and tightly set, that cover entire margin of the ring; the smaller distal suckers have only 6–8 teeth while the suckers located near the arm bases have teeth which are merged and present a smooth surface except for few distal undulations.

On the tentacular club the largest two suckers are in the middle two rows of the club manus, and these have one or two enlarged, hook-like teeth with no other teeth present; the other enlarged suckers in the middle rows of the club have two large hook-like teeth which were nearly equal in size with 4–5 smaller secondary teeth. The suckers in the lateral rows of the manus are laterally compressed, each sucker bearing two long, curved teeth on distal and pointed teeth on the lateral margin of the sucker ring.

The tentacular stalk has two rows of locking suckers on distal two-thirds to three-quarters on the stalk with an indistinct carpal cluster at base of manus. The mantle has a smooth skin and where it meets the funnel there are no tubercules. It has elongated, lanceolate fins which have a length equivalent 44% of the mantle length and at their anterior ends they are widely separated. The gladius protrudes out between the posterior ends of the fins to form a tail.

== Distribution ==
Taonius belone was originally collected in the Indian Ocean at 10°8'S, 97°14'E. SInce the type specimen was collected and described this species has been recorded off southern Japan, in the Philippine Islands, the Hawaiian Islands, and throughout the central equatorial Pacific. Its known distribution suggests that it is distributed throughout the tropical and subtropical Indo-Pacific, but actual records are few and far between.

== Habitat and biology ==
Taonius belone is a large pelagic and oceanic squid, referred to as mesopelagic. It has planktonic paralarvae and the eye of this species changes during ontogenetic development. In waters off Hawaii, T. belone undertakes a downward vertical migration as it matures. The paralarvae have laterally compressed eyes at the ends of stalks and they can be found in the upper 400 m of the water column, while the larger juveniles occur at depths between 500 and 700 m (1,600 and 2,300 ft), and the subadults which have hemispherical, stalkless eyes inhabit depths below 700 m.

== Taxonomy ==
Taonius belone was originally described as the nominate subspecies of a species then known as T. borealis, i.e. T. b. borealis. The other was T. b. pacifica. Both these taxa were considered to be members of the genus Belonella but this is now considered to be synonymous with Taonius. They are now thought of as sister species with T.belone in the tropical Indo-Pacific and T. borealis in the North Pacific.
