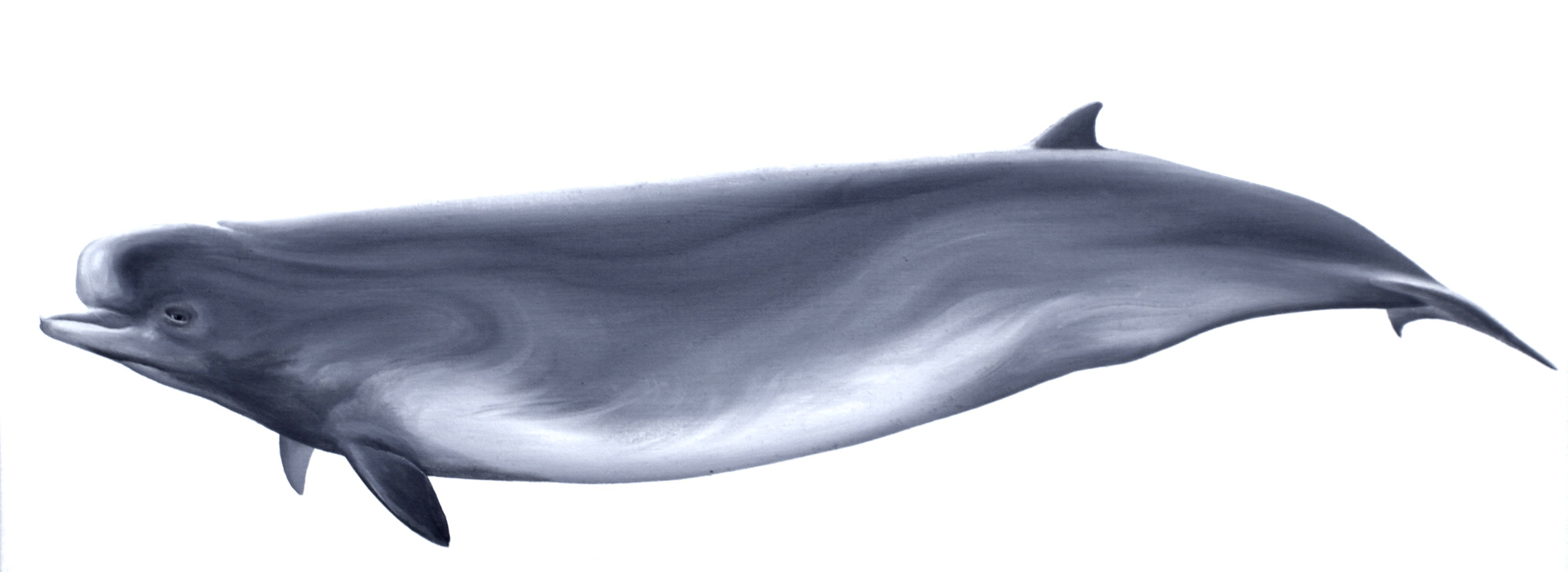

- Size compared to an average human

Conservation status
- Least Concern (IUCN 3.1)
- CITES Appendix I

Scientific classification
- Kingdom: Animalia
- Phylum: Chordata
- Class: Mammalia
- Order: Artiodactyla
- Infraorder: Cetacea
- Family: Ziphiidae
- Genus: Hyperoodon
- Species: H. planifrons

Binomial name
- Hyperoodon planifrons (Flower, 1882)
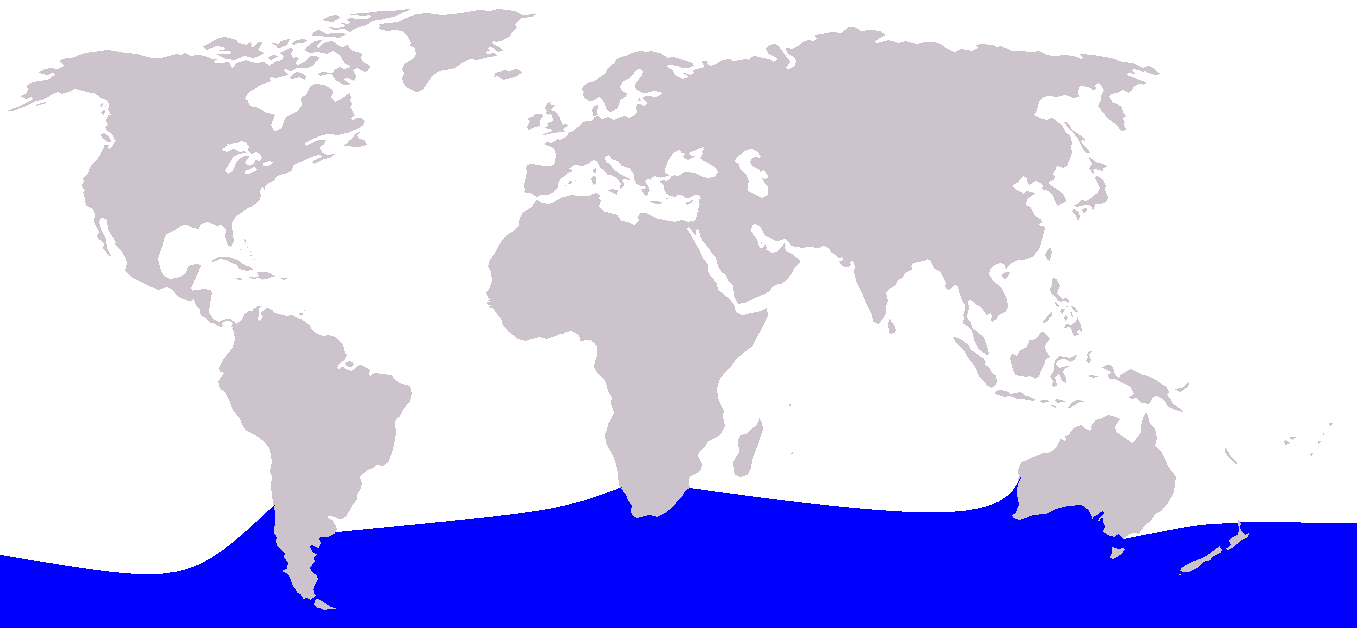
- Southern bottlenose whale range

= Southern bottlenose whale =

Species of mammal

The southern bottlenose whale (Hyperoodon planifrons) is a species of whale, in the ziphiid family, one of two members of the genus Hyperoodon. Seldom observed, the southern bottlenose whale is resident in Antarctic waters. The species was first described by English zoologist William Henry Flower in 1882, based on a water-worn skull from Lewis Island, in the Dampier Archipelago, Western Australia. It lives in deep ocean waters over 1,000 m (3,300 ft).

== Taxonomy ==
No subspecies of the southern bottlenose whale are named. A mtDNA study of two southern bottlenose whales from different regions of New Zealand was conducted and found that mtDNA differed 4.13%, which is higher than the interspecific variation of 2% found in other beaked whales. Intraspecific coloration variation may be due to genetics; however, variation based on geographical location is not ruled out.

== Description ==
The southern bottlenose whale measures 7.5 m (25 ft) in length when physically mature, considerably smaller than the northern bottlenose whale. The beak is long and white in males but grey in females. The dorsal fin is relatively small at 30–38 cm (12–15 in), set behind the middle of the back, falcate (sickle-shaped), and usually pointed. The back is light-to-mid grey. It has a lighter underside. There is currently no evidence to support sexual dimorphism in coloration. More data need to be collected to understand if coloration differences are individualized or based on geographic range.

== Geographic range and distribution ==
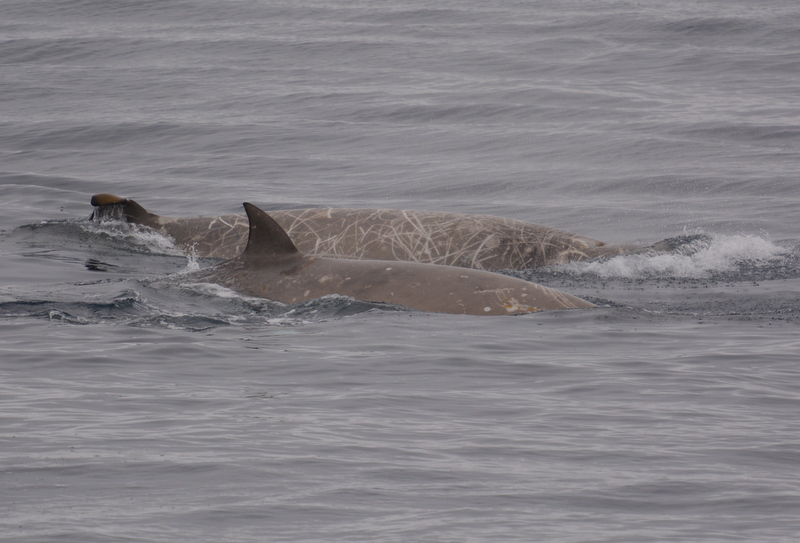
Two individuals off Clarence Island, Antarctica.

The southern bottlenose whale has a circumpolar distribution in the Southern Ocean.They live in remote environments beyond continental shelves in water deeper than 1,000 meters.

It is found as far south as the Antarctic coast and as far north as the tip of South Africa, New Zealand's North Island and the southern parts of Brazil.

Sightings of bottlenose whales in tropical and subtropical waters were likely not of southern bottlenose whales; rather they were of a poorly known species, Longman's beaked whale.

== Behavior ==
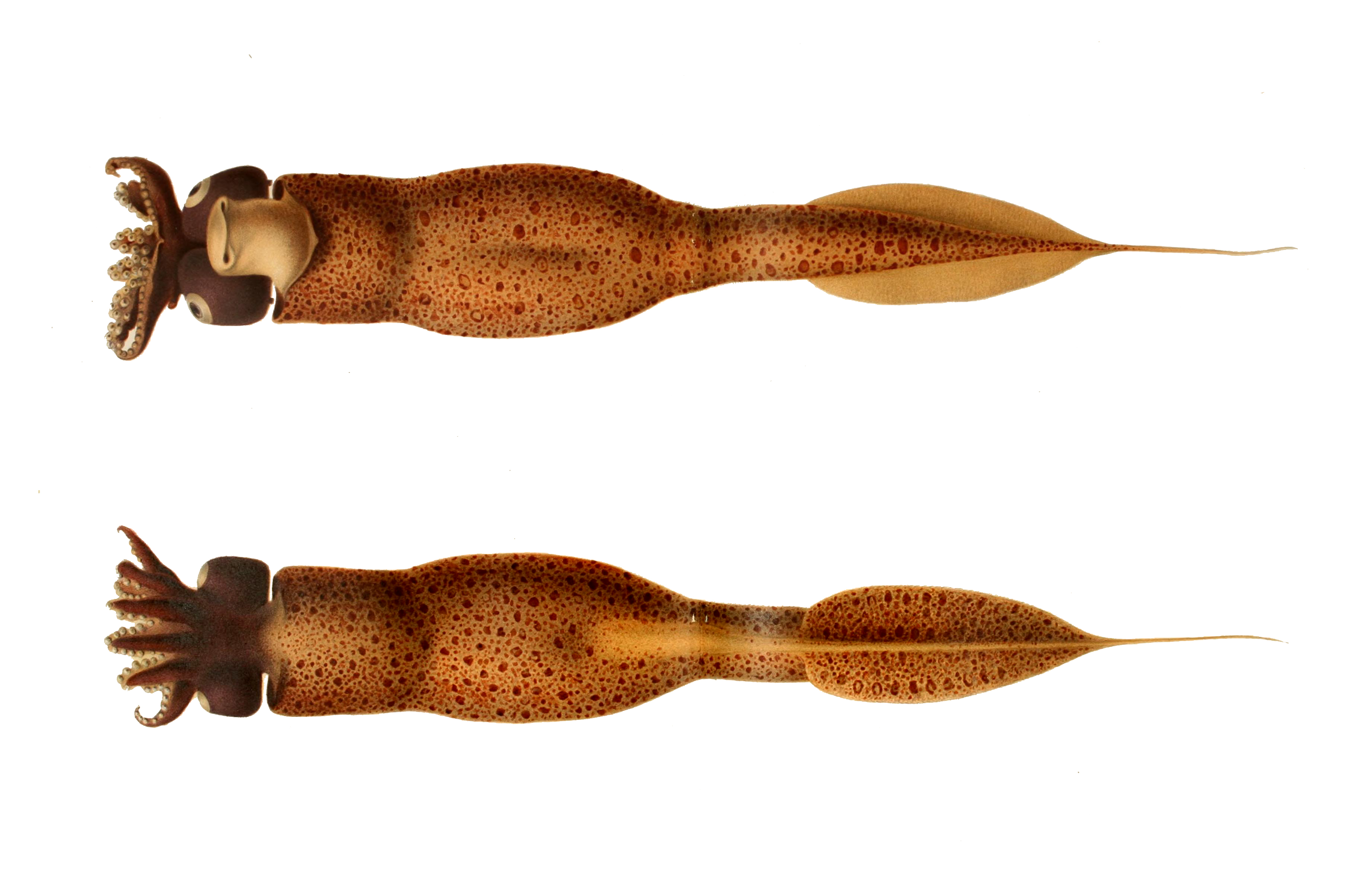
Taonius pavo seems to be an important prey item.

=== Social behavior ===
Dive times range from 15 to 40 mins, which is a long dive time relative to other cetaceans, and occur in small group sizes between 1-5 individuals. As typical for beaked whales, adult males tend to have extensive white scarring throughout the body, typically presumed to be the result of intraspecific aggression. Some scarring is also suggested to have been caused by squid suckers.

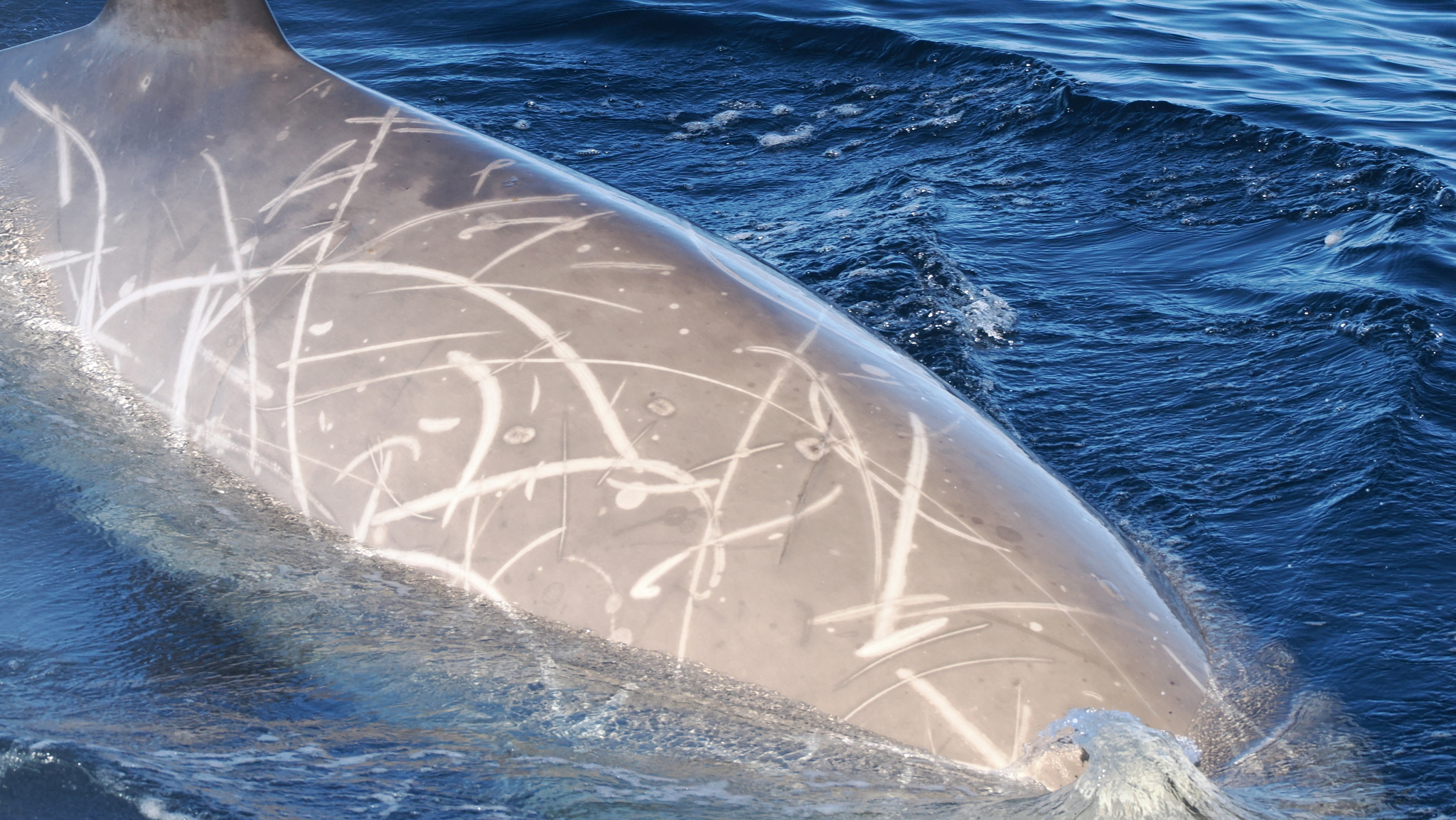
Back of an adult individual showing extensive scarring and healed cookiecutter shark wounds.

=== Food and foraging ===
The southern bottlenose whale feeds mainly on squid. Recorded taxa include Histioteuthis eltaninae and H. meleagroteuthis, Taonius pavo, Gonatus antarcticus, Moroteuthopsis ingens and M. longimana, Chiroteuthis sp., Galiteuthis glacialis, Martialia hyadesii, Alluroteuthis antarcticus, Filippovia knipovitchi, Psychroteuthis glacialis, and Liocranchia sp. Other prey include krill, some fish (Patagonian tootfish) and tunicates. Interestingly, remains of juvenile, subadult, and possibly mature colossal squid have been recorded in the stomachs of some individuals, with estimated mantle lengths up to ~120 cm and weights up to ~13.8 kg; the species’ rotating hooks may also contribute to the extensive scarring observed. How they capture these large cephalopods is unknown.

They presumably feed by suction-feeding, creating a negative pressure cavity in its mouth by retracting its tongue and expanding the throat grooves, powerfully drawing prey inside like a biological vacuum. The melon contains the waxy liquid spermaceti, which could indicate that they use echolocation to find prey. The stomach is divided into seven chambers, consisting of a single digestive ‘true stomach’ and a six-chambered non-digestive section that likely stores and mechanically processes squid prey.

== Population status ==
The global population is unknown. Population estimates are lacking; however, southern bottlenose whales accounted for more than 90% of ziphiid sightings in the Antarctic Circle.

== Threats ==
The biggest threat to the southern bottlenose whale has been whaling. Soviet whalers took a few specimens for research, and Japanese whalers took 42 specimens.

== Conservation ==
A whale sanctuary in the Southern Ocean was created in 1994 by the International Whaling Commission. This prohibited whaling in the Southern Ocean. Forty-two southern bottlenose whales were caught in the Antarctic by Soviet whalers between 1970 and 1982. In addition, the southern bottlenose whale is covered by the Memorandum of Understanding for the Conservation of Cetaceans and Their Habitats in the Pacific Islands Region (Pacific Cetaceans MOU). Currently the IUCN status is Least Concern.

== See also ==
- List of cetaceans
