= Deep-sea gigantism =

Tendency of deep-sea animal species

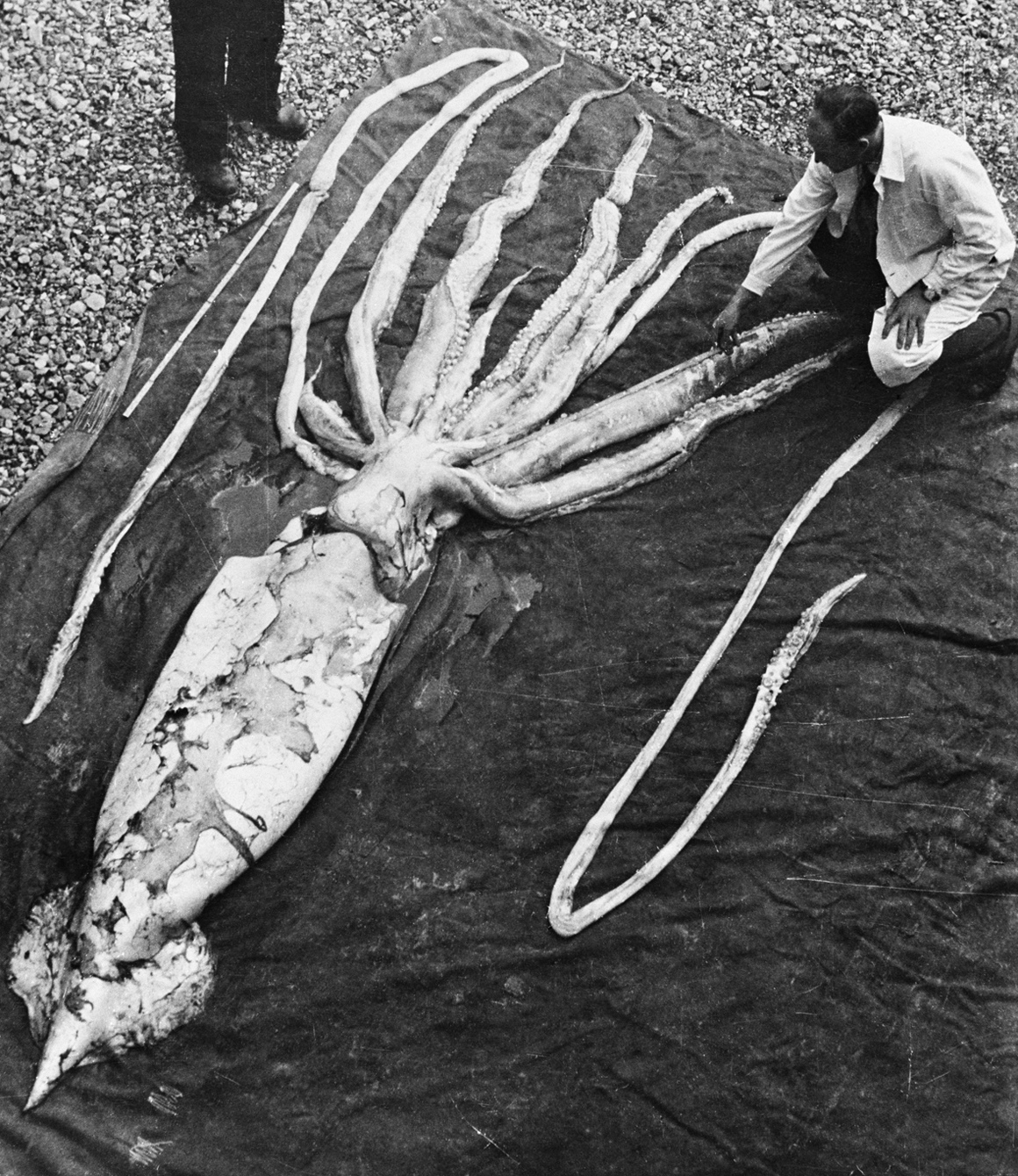
Examination of a 9 m (30 ft) giant squid, the second largest cephalopod, that washed ashore in Norway in 1954

In zoology, deep-sea gigantism, or abyssal gigantism, is the tendency for species of deep-sea dwelling animals to be larger than their shallower-water relatives across a large taxonomic range. Proposed explanations for this type of gigantism include necessary adaptation to colder temperature, food scarcity, reduced predation pressure and increased dissolved oxygen concentrations in the deep sea. The harsh conditions and inhospitality of the underwater environment in general, as well as the inaccessibility of the abyssal zone for most human-made underwater vehicles, have hindered the study of this topic.

== Taxonomic range ==
In marine crustaceans, the trend of increasing size with depth has been observed in mysids, euphausiids, decapods, isopods, ostracods and amphipods. Non-arthropods in which deep-sea gigantism has been observed are cephalopods, cnidarians, and eels from the order Anguilliformes.

Other [animals] attain under them gigantic proportions. It is especially certain crustacea which exhibit this latter peculiarity, but not all crustacea, for the crayfish like forms in the deep sea are of ordinary size. I have already referred to a gigantic Pycnogonid [sea spider] dredged by us. Louis Agassiz dredged a gigantic Isopod 11 inches [28 centimetres] in length. We also dredged a gigantic Ostracod. – Henry Nottidge Moseley, 1880

Notable organisms that exhibit deep-sea gigantism include the big red jellyfish, the giant phantom jelly, the giant isopod, giant ostracod, the giant sea spider, the giant amphipod, the Japanese spider crab, the giant oarfish, the deepwater stingray, the seven-arm octopus, and a number of squid species: the colossal squid (up to 14 m in length), the giant squid (up to 12 m), Megalocranchia fisheri, robust clubhook squid, Dana octopus squid, cockatoo squid, giant warty squid, and the bigfin squids of the genus Magnapinna.

Deep-sea gigantism is not generally observed in the meiofauna (organisms that pass through a 1 mm (0.039 in) mesh), which actually exhibit the reverse trend of decreasing size with depth.

== Explanations ==
=== Lower temperature ===
In crustaceans, it has been proposed that the explanation for the increase in size with depth is similar to that for the increase in size with latitude (Bergmann's rule): both trends involve increasing size with decreasing temperature. The trend with latitude has been observed in some of the same groups, both in comparisons of related species, as well as within widely distributed species. Decreasing temperature is thought to result in increased cell size and increased life span (the latter also being associated with delayed sexual maturity), both of which lead to an increase in maximum body size (continued growth throughout life is characteristic of crustaceans). In Arctic and Antarctic seas where there is a reduced vertical temperature gradient, there is also a reduced trend towards increased body size with depth, arguing against hydrostatic pressure being an important parameter.

Temperature does not appear to have a similar role in influencing the size of giant tube worms. Riftia pachyptila, which lives in hydrothermal vent communities at ambient temperatures of 2–30 °C, reaches lengths of 2.7 m, comparable to those of Lamellibrachia luymesi, which lives in cold seeps. The former, however, has rapid growth rates and short life spans of about 2 years, while the latter is slow growing and may live over 250 years.

=== Food scarcity ===
Food scarcity at depths greater than 400 m is also thought to be a factor, since larger body size can improve ability to forage for widely scattered resources. In organisms with planktonic eggs or larvae, another possible advantage is that larger offspring, with greater initial stored food reserves, can drift for greater distances. As an example of adaptations to this situation, giant isopods gorge on food when available, distending their bodies to the point of compromising ability to locomote; they can also survive 5 years without food in captivity.

According to Kleiber's law, the larger an animal gets, the more efficient its metabolism becomes; i.e., an animal's basal metabolic rate scales to roughly the ¾ power of its mass. Under conditions of limited food supply, this may provide additional benefit to large size.

=== Reduced predation pressure ===
Another possible influence is reduced predation pressure in deeper waters. A study of brachiopods found that predation was nearly an order of magnitude less frequent at the greatest depths than in shallow waters.

=== Increased dissolved oxygen ===
Dissolved oxygen levels are also thought to play a role in deep-sea gigantism. A 1999 study of benthic amphipod crustaceans found that maximum potential organism size directly correlates with the increased levels of dissolved oxygen levels in deeper waters. The solubility of dissolved oxygen in the oceans is known to be lower in oxygen-poor intermediary depths (ranging 200–1000 meters) until the increasing pressure, decreasing salinity levels, and colder temperatures of deeper water can contribute increasing solubility once more.

However, solubility does not necessarily equate to access as many areas of colder waters have exhibited lower levels of available oxygen. The proposed theory behind this trend is that deep-sea gigantism could be an adaptive trait to combat asphyxiation in frigid, dense ocean waters. Larger organisms are able to intake more dissolved oxygen within the ocean, allowing for sufficient respiration. However, this increased absorption of oxygen runs the risk of toxicity poisoning where an organism can have oxygen levels that are so high that they become harmful and poisonous.

== Impact of climate change ==
Warmer global temperatures may have an effect on the deep sea as much as the shallower surface waters of the ocean, as evidence suggests that deep-sea ecosystems can be sensitive to shifts within the climate. Despite appearing relatively unchanging, the dependence of life in the depths on food supply to drift down in the form of marine snow and water currents traveling throughout all depths of the ocean calls into concern the manner in which global climate change may affect these organisms and the biomes they live in.

Following trends from the Paleocene-Eocene thermal maximum and related timescales, research suggests that current predictions of continuous greenhouse gas emissions and climate change will lead to higher ocean temperatures and a significant reduction in levels of dissolved oxygen in the deep sea. Should global warming lead to a warmer ocean state, thermohaline circulation would no longer be able to maintain an oxygen-rich deep sea, which would eventually lead to deep water becoming higher in both temperature and salinity.

Based upon current theories regarding the existence of deep-sea gigantism, we would expect to see the phenomenon diminish in response to these changes in the environment, as it may become unfavorable or even impossible for these organisms to sustain a larger body form.

== Gallery ==
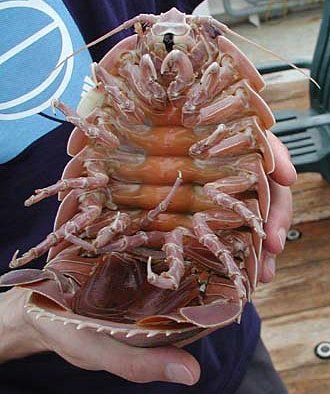
A giant isopod (Bathynomus giganteus) may reach up to 0.76 m (2 ft 6 in) in length.

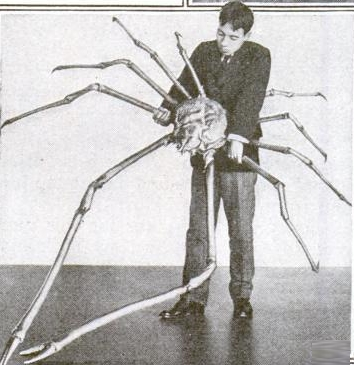
A Japanese spider crab whose outstretched legs measured 3.7 m (12 ft) across

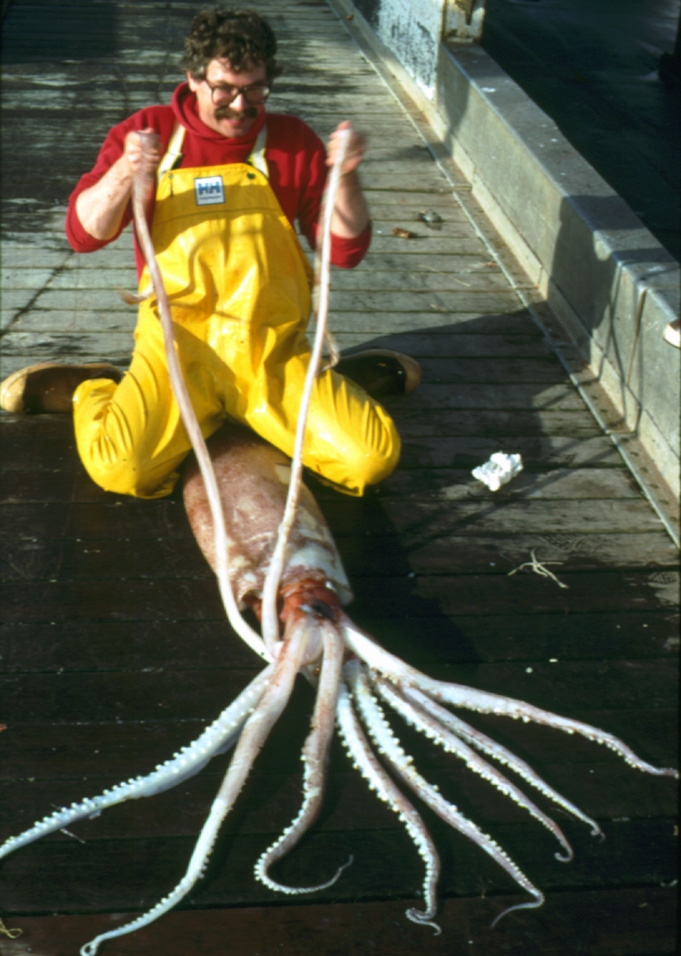
A robust clubhook squid, whose mantle reaches 2 m (6 ft 7 in) in length, caught off Alaska

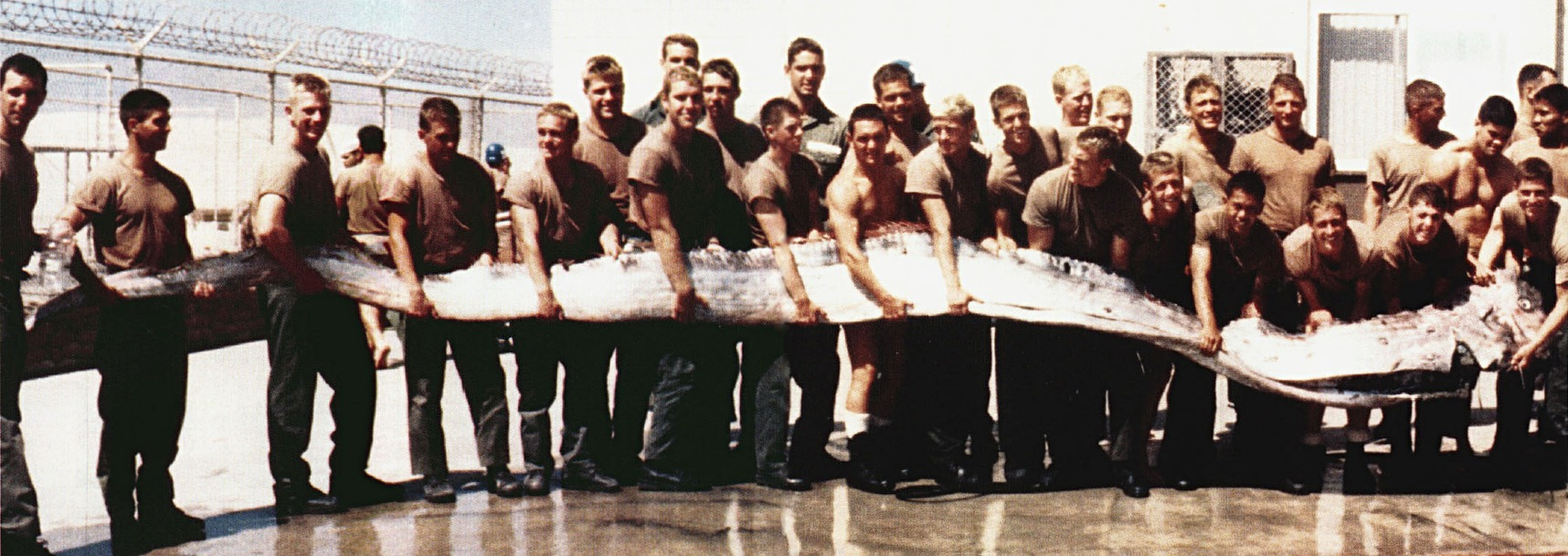
A 7 m (23 ft) giant oarfish, washed up on the beach of a Navy SEAL training base in California

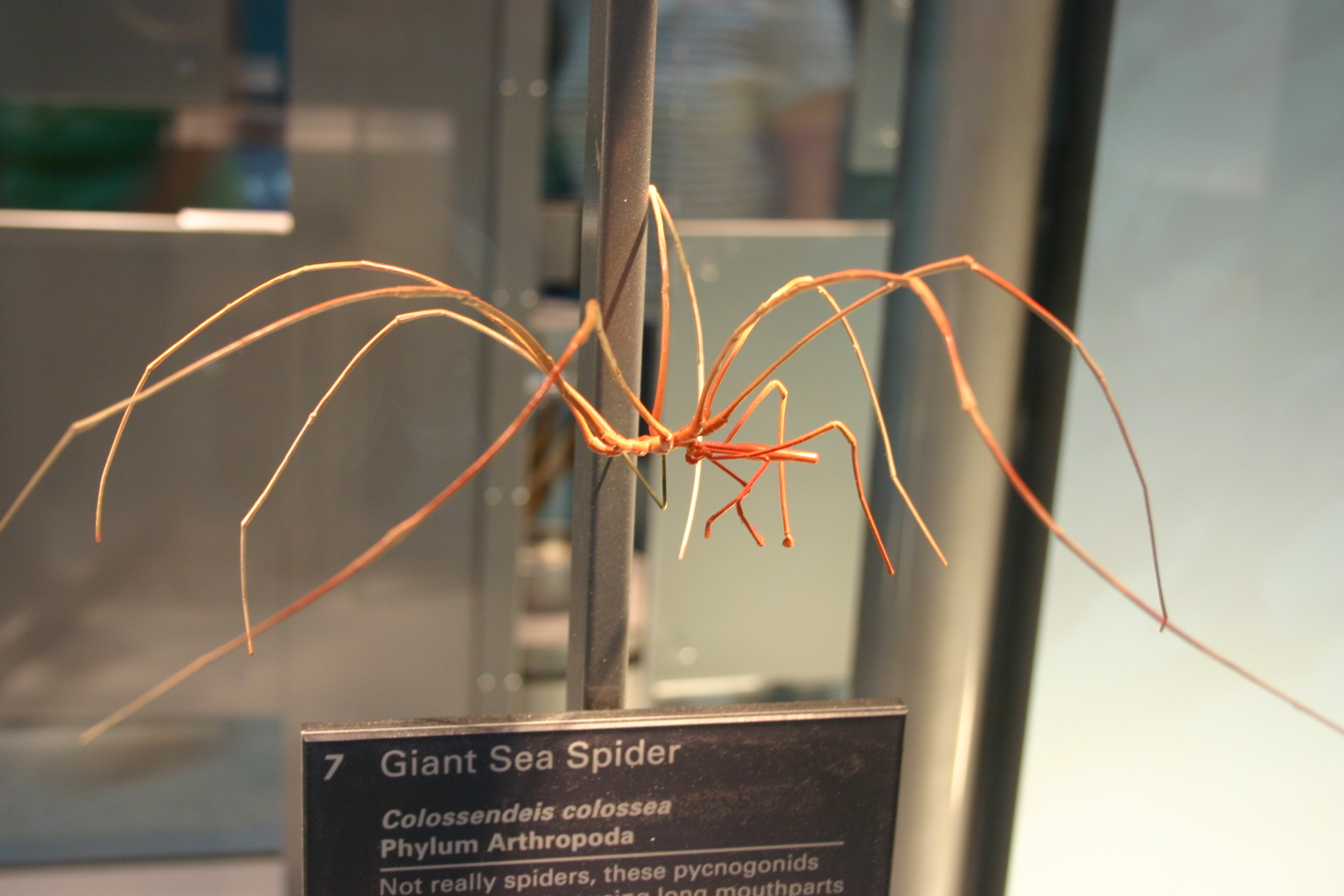
A Colossendeis colossea sea spider, displayed at the Smithsonian

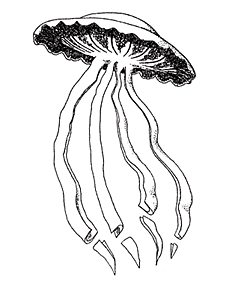
A giant phantom jelly, which can grow up to 10 m (33 ft) in length

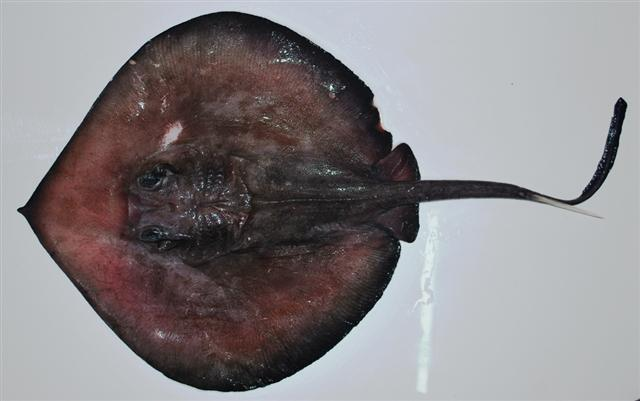
A deepwater stingray, which can reach up to 2.7 m × 1.5 m (8 ft 10 in × 4 ft 11 in) in size

== See also ==
- Cephalopod size
- Dwarfing
- Island gigantism
- Insular dwarfism
- Largest organisms
- Megafauna
- Polar gigantism
