= Polar gigantism =

Tendency for large polar fauna size

Polar gigantism is the tendency of Arctic and Antarctic fauna to have unusually large body sizes. One theory proposed to explain the phenomenon is the oxygen-temperature hypothesis, which argues that greater oxygen content in colder waters supports larger organisms. All species exhibiting traits of polar gigantism are marine.

One example of a species that exhibits polar gigantism is the Greenland shark, which can grow up to 24 feet long. Another example is the Colossal squid, the heaviest living invertebrate, that is endemic in the Southern Ocean around Antarctica. In fact, the Southern Ocean is also home to one of the largest sponges in the world, Anoxycalyx joubini. Other noted animals include Glyptonotus antarcticus, a large crustacean, the large Antarctic scallop, and many species of the sea star genus Leptychaster.

Certain samples of sea spiders living in polar areas have displayed large leg lengths. However, experiments testing the oxygen-temperature hypothesis have shown that small and large sea spiders react similarly when faced with particular proportions of oxygen; the study could indicate that the oxygen-temperature hypothesis is flawed.

== See also ==
- Deep-sea gigantism
- Dwarfing
- Island gigantism
- Insular dwarfism
- Largest organisms
- Megafauna
- Oxygen minimum zone
