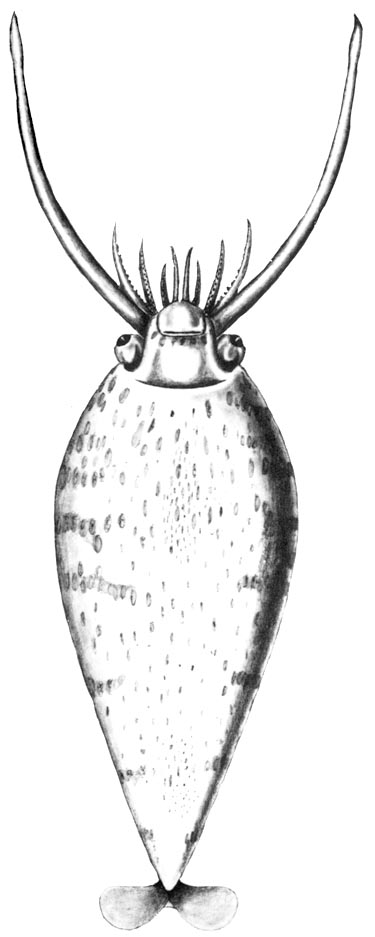
- Ventral view of a specimen taken off Southern California (41 mm ML)

Conservation status
- Data Deficient (IUCN 3.1)

Scientific classification
- Kingdom: Animalia
- Phylum: Mollusca
- Class: Cephalopoda
- Order: Oegopsida
- Family: Cranchiidae
- Subfamily: Taoniinae
- Genus: Helicocranchia
- Species: H. pfefferi

Binomial name
- Helicocranchia pfefferi Massy, 1907

Synonyms
- Helicocranchia beebei Robson, 1948

= Helicocranchia pfefferi =

Banded piglet squid

Species of squid

Helicocranchia pfefferi, the banded piglet squid, is a small squid of the genus Helicocranchia. Adults of this species are mesopelagic.

== Physical characteristics ==
The average size of adult H. pfefferi is 100 mm (3.9 in) in mantle length (ML). The body consists of a large funnel with small paddle-like fins. They have small tentacles above their eyes. The funnel does not have valves, but contains a dorsal pad with three papillae as organs. Paddle-shaped fins are attached to a part of the gladius. H. pfefferi has a single ocular photophore and does not have photophores at its arm tips.

== Habitat ==
H. pfefferi can be found in subtropical areas of the Atlantic Ocean, and in the Pacific Ocean, though this record may represent a new species of the same genus Helicocranchia. As paralarvae (<30 mm ML), they live near the surface of the oceans, between 100 m and 200 m deep. They descend to the mesopelagic zone as they mature, but exhibit a diel vertical migration pattern.

== Prey ==
Its diet resembles that of most squid: fish, shrimp, and squid.
