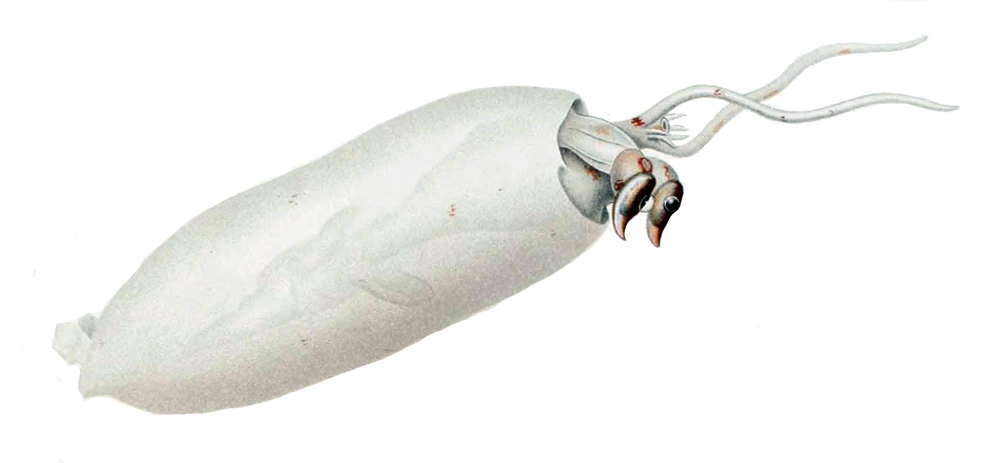

Conservation status
- Data Deficient (IUCN 3.1)

Scientific classification
- Domain: Eukaryota
- Kingdom: Animalia
- Phylum: Mollusca
- Class: Cephalopoda
- Order: Oegopsida
- Family: Cranchiidae
- Genus: Sandalops; Chun, 1906
- Species: S. melancholicus

Binomial name
- Sandalops melancholicus Chun, 1906

Synonyms
- Uranoteuthis bilucifer Lu & Clarke, 1974

= Sandalops melancholicus =

Sandal-eyed squid

Species of squid

Sandalops melancholicus, the sandal-eyed squid or melancholy cranch squid, is a small species of glass squid. It is known to reach a mantle length of 11 cm (4.3 in). It is distributed in the tropical and subtropical oceans around the world. It is the only species in the genus Sandalops but some authorities suggest that this may be a species complex rather than a monotypic genus.

== Description ==
Sandalops melancholicus is a small squid which grows to a mantle length of 110mm. There are only suckers on the tentacular clubs with a further two series of suckers and pads on distal half of the stalk of the tentacles. It does not possess a funnel valve and the funnel organ has a distal pad and two large triangle shaped flaps. It has short, round fins with the posterior end of the gladius protruding between them. Like Liguriella, but not in any other Taoniinae, it has two contiguous photophores on its eye, a large one and a small one, and it does not have any photophores on its arms. The juveniles have tubular eyes, a feature shared with Taonius, and the broad vanes on the gladius are very distinctive, a useful characteristic for identifying Sandalops.

== Distribution ==
Sandalops melancholicus is a cosmopolitan species which has a circumglobar distribution in the subtropical and tropical oceans. The type specimen was original taken off Tristan da Cunha in the South Atlantic. There may be three or four closely related species rather than a single species within Sandalops.

== Biology ==
Sandalops melancholicus occurs in the epipelagic, mesopelagic and bathypelagic zones, like other glass squid it has a pattern of moving deeper as it matures, called ontogenetic descent. There is no evidence of any movements governed by time of day.

The paralarvae inhabit the upper few hundred metres of the water column, the epipelagic zone. Their eyes are laterally compressed and they have a rostrum, the rostrum and the lateral compression allow the opaque eyes to be concealed in the squid's otherwise transparent body. The paralarval eyes are what give this species both its most common vernacular name, sandal-eyed squid and its generic name of Sandalops. The juveniles are found in the upper mesopelagic zone, also called the "twilight zone" and here they develop tubular eyes. Its head is angled with respect to the body axis and in life the eyes point upwards to the light and have their lower silhouette hidden by the two photophores. The sub-adults occur lower in the mesopelagic zone and their eyes are hemispherical in shape.

By the time they are sexually mature adults they have reached the bathypelagic zone, below 2000m and it is here that mating takes place. In mature males the arms are modified, they are broad closest to the head and the protective membranes are expanded. The protective membranes do not extend towards the tips of the arms. The suckers on the arms are greatly reduced in size in at least two series on arms II and III. The sub-adult females lose their tentacles and are heavily pigmented. Adults have spherical protruding eyes.
