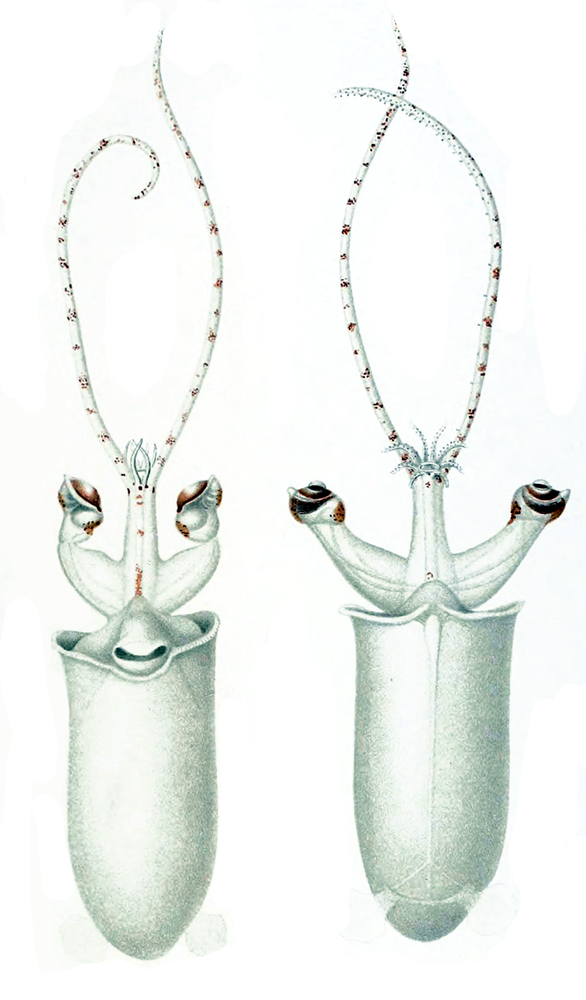
- Bathothauma lyromma paralarva (~65 mm ML)

Conservation status
- Least Concern (IUCN 3.1)

Scientific classification
- Kingdom: Animalia
- Phylum: Mollusca
- Class: Cephalopoda
- Order: Oegopsida
- Superfamily: Cranchioidea
- Family: Cranchiidae
- Subfamily: Taoniinae
- Genus: Bathothauma; Chun, 1906
- Species: B. lyromma

Binomial name
- Bathothauma lyromma Chun, 1906

Synonyms
- Leucocranchia pfefferi Joubin, 1912

= Bathothauma =

Species of squid

Bathothauma lyromma, the lyre cranch squid, is a highly modified species of glass squid from the family Cranchiidae with a distribution which encompasses most of the world's oceans from the tropics to high latitudes.

== Description ==
Bathothauma lyromma is an atypical glass squid which has very large paralarva which can reach a mantle length of 100mm and has its eyes mounted on a long stalk possesses and a very long brachial pillar. Both these features are reabsorbed as the paralarva matures into a subadult. As an adult it grows to a mantle length of 200mm. The tentacular club only has suckers while the stalk has two rows of suckers and pads at the base and four rows near the club which form an elongated carpal group. The funnel organ has an inverted V-shaped dorsal pad and has no valve. It has almost no tubercles at the fusion of the funnel and the mantle. The small, paddle shaped fins are widely separated and position sub-terminally. As in all Cranchiidae, the eyes have photophores.

== Distribution ==
Bathothauma lyromma has an extremely wide oceanic distribution and it occurs in oceans throughout the world in tropical and subtropical regions; in the Atlantic it is known to occur from 35° to 45°N to 35° to 40°S. It is, however, absent from the subtropical waters of the south-eastern Atlantic.

== Biology ==
The long eye-stalked paralarvae of Bathothauma lyromma are planktonic and are found in the upper water column from less than 100m in depth down to 300m. As they age they undergo an ontogenetic vertical migration in which the larger individuals move down into the deeper depths of more than 1,500 m. They become sexually mature and mate at the depths.

== Taxonomy ==
Bathothauma lyromma is currently regarded as the only species in its monotypic genus but research indicates that there may be as many as four closely related species within the species circumglobal distribution, If this is correct then this species may represent a species complex.
