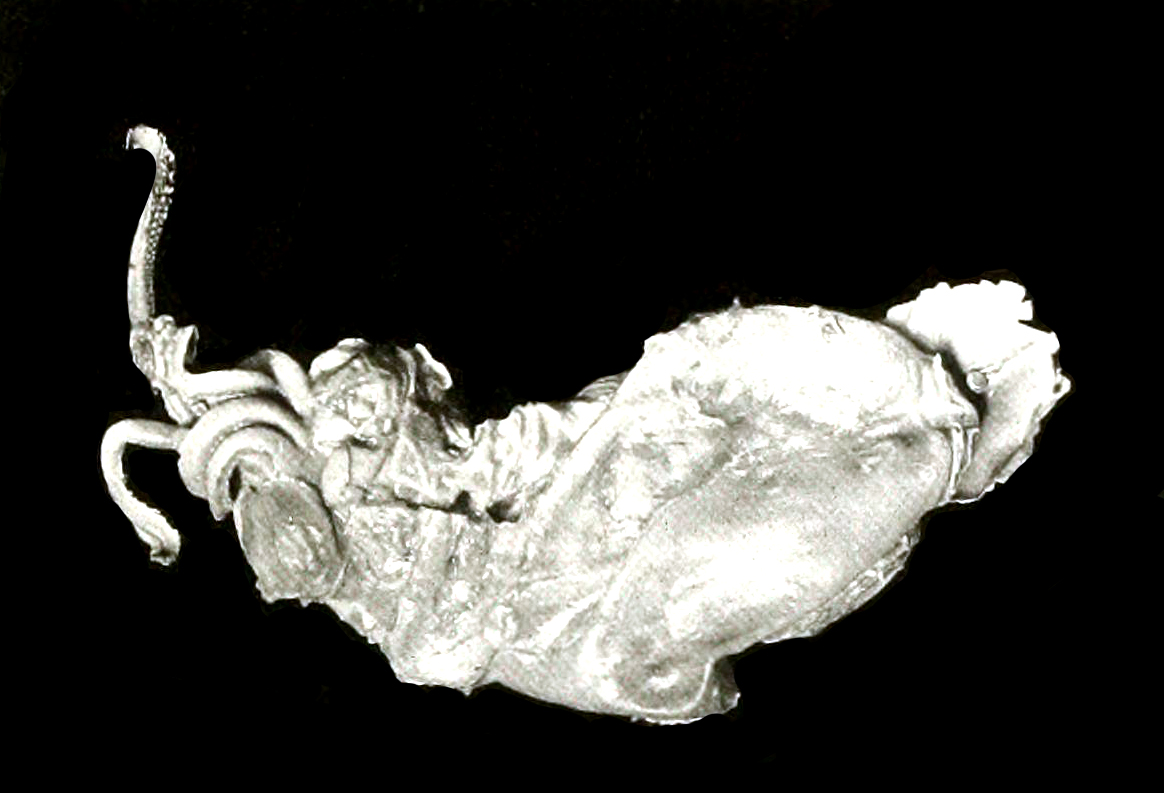
- Juvenile Megalocranchia fisheri

Conservation status
- Data Deficient (IUCN 3.1)

Scientific classification
- Kingdom: Animalia
- Phylum: Mollusca
- Class: Cephalopoda
- Order: Oegopsida
- Family: Cranchiidae
- Genus: Megalocranchia
- Species: M. fisheri

Binomial name
- Megalocranchia fisheri (Berry, 1909)

Synonyms
- Helicocranchia fisheri Berry, 1909

= Megalocranchia fisheri =

Species of squid

Megalocranchia fisheri is a species of glass squid. Its natural range covers at least the waters off Hawaii. The species may attain a mantle length of 1.8 m (5.9 ft) and a total length of over 2.7 m (8.9 ft), making it one of the largest species of squid, together with the colossal squid (Mesonychoteuthis hamiltoni), the giant squid (Architeuthis sp.), and the robust clubhook squid (Onykia robusta). It inhabits surface and mid-depth waters of open ocean. Juveniles live near the surface, while adults occupy mesopelagic depths during the day and migrate to near-surface waters at night. M. fisheri possesses two large light organs in the gill cavity. Females additionally have light organs on the ends of their third arm pair. As the animal matures, its fins become spear-like in appearance.

It is possible that this taxon is conspecific with Megalocranchia abyssicola, in which case M. fisheri would become a junior synonym.

== See also ==
- Cephalopod size
