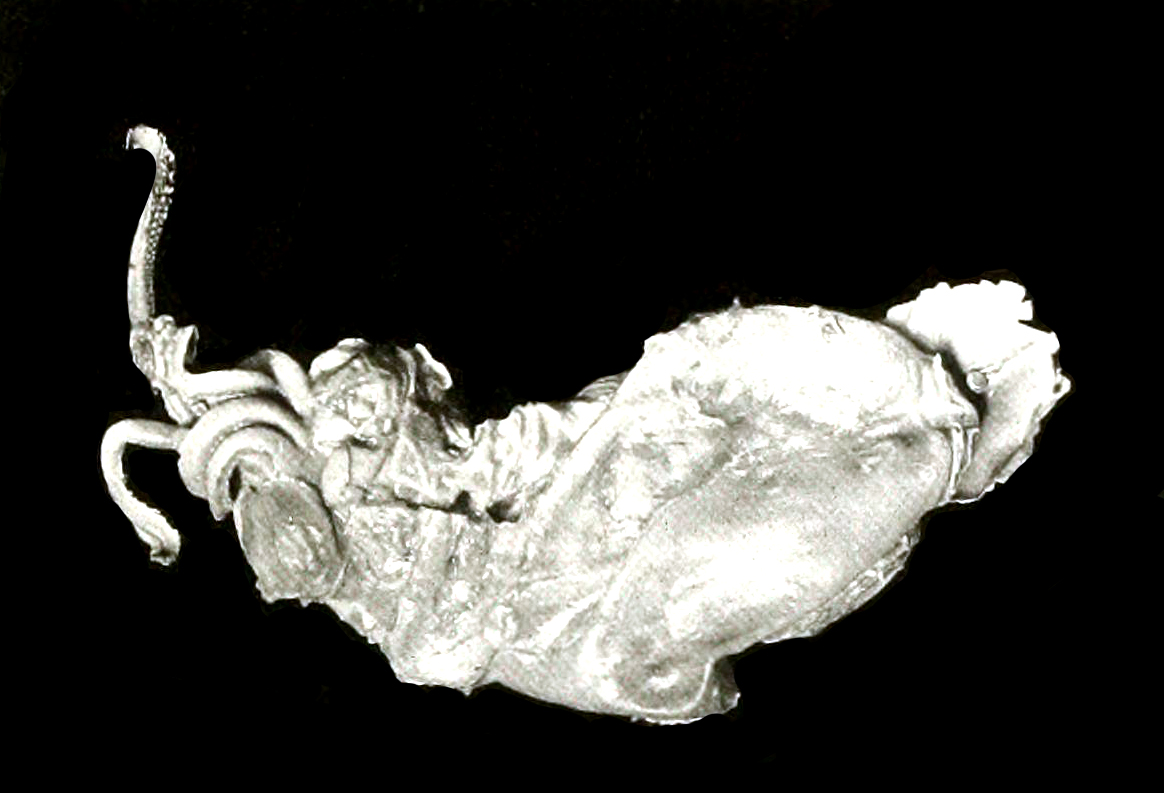
- Megalocranchia fisheri

Scientific classification
- Domain: Eukaryota
- Kingdom: Animalia
- Phylum: Mollusca
- Class: Cephalopoda
- Order: Oegopsida
- Family: Cranchiidae
- Subfamily: Taoniinae
- Genus: Megalocranchia; Pfeffer, 1884

Type species
- Megalocranchia maxima Pfeffer, 1884

Species
- Megalocranchia sp. A Megalocranchia abyssicola Megalocranchia fisheri Megalocranchia maxima Megalocranchia oceanica

= Megalocranchia =

Genus of squids

Megalocranchia is a genus of glass squids. It occurs circumglobally in tropical and subtropical waters.

== Description ==
Some members of the genus Megalocranchia can reach large sizes, up to 1800mm in the case of M. fisheri. Young paralarvae often resemble other members of the Cranchiidae, having transparent bodies to aid in camouflage. Where the internal organs cannot be made transparent, for example in the digestive system, visceral photophores can be found. These visceral photophores are unique to this genus within the family. The paralarvae also have a thick gelatinous dermis covering the mantle, which again is unique to the Megalocranchia within the family. This dermis also features patches of orange chromatophores in juvenile individuals.
