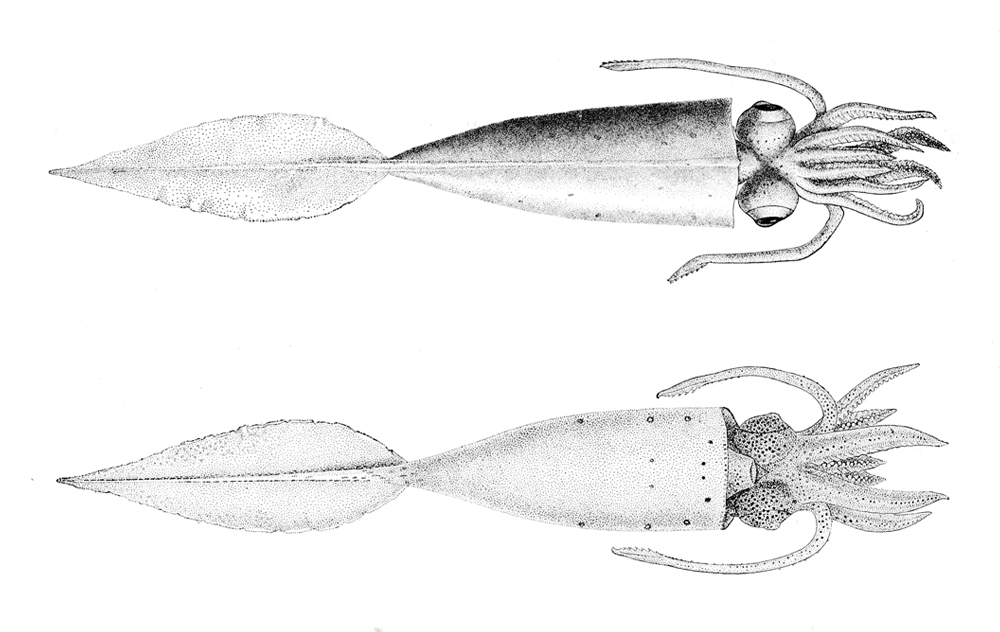

Conservation status
- Least Concern (IUCN 3.1)

Scientific classification
- Kingdom: Animalia
- Phylum: Mollusca
- Class: Cephalopoda
- Order: Oegopsida
- Family: Cranchiidae
- Genus: Galiteuthis
- Species: G. phyllura

Binomial name
- Galiteuthis phyllura Berry, 1911

Synonyms
- Crystalloteuthis beringiana Sasaki, 1920

= Galiteuthis phyllura =

Species of squid

Galiteuthis phyllura, also known as the cockatoo squid, is a species of glass squid, possibly the largest in the genus. In 1984, the Soviet stern-trawler Novoulyanovsk brought up the remains of a gigantic specimen of G. phyllura from a depth of 1,000–1,300 m (3,300–4,300 ft) in the Sea of Okhotsk. Based on this material, which consisted of a 40 cm (16 in) long arm and 115 cm (45 in) tentacle, Kir Nesis estimated the mantle length at 265–275 cm (104–108 in), and the total length at over 4 m (13 ft). If accurate, this would make G. phyllura the second largest squid species in terms of mantle length, after only the colossal squid, and even surpassing the mantle length of the giant squid. However, Nesis added that "because of its narrow body, we conclude that its mass is consistently lower than that of the other large squids".

The type specimen of G. phyllura was collected in Monterey Bay, California and is deposited in the National Museum of Natural History.
