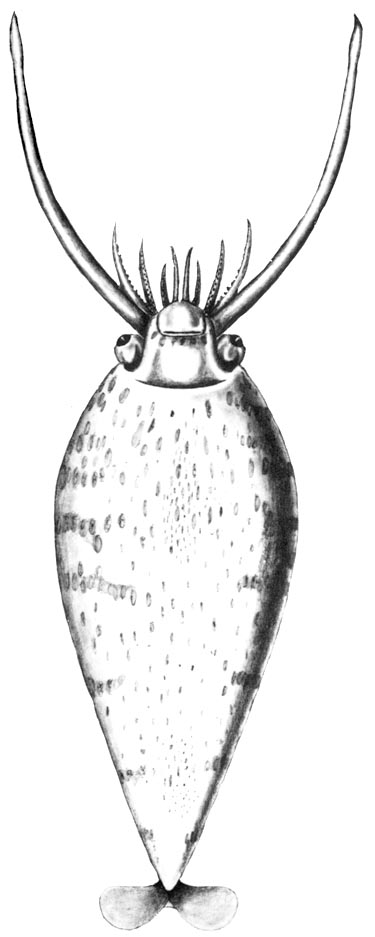
- Helicocranchia pfefferi

Scientific classification
- Kingdom: Animalia
- Phylum: Mollusca
- Class: Cephalopoda
- Order: Oegopsida
- Family: Cranchiidae
- Subfamily: Taoniinae
- Genus: Helicocranchia; Massy, 1907

Type species
- Helicocranchia pfefferi Massy, 1907

Species
- see text

Synonyms
- Ascocranchia Voss, 1962

= Helicocranchia =

Genus of squids

Helicocranchia is a genus of small glass squids from the family Cranchiidae, known as piglet squid. They are characterized by possessing a very large funnel and in having a pair of small paddle-like fins which are attached to a part of the gladius which sits above the muscular mantle. These squid undergo a slow descent starting near the surface as paralarvae moving down to lower mesopelagic depths as near-adults.

The genus contains bioluminescent species.

== Species ==
There are five named species of Helicocranchia, though only three are considered valid:

- Helicocranchia joubini (Voss, 1962) - suggested to be nomen dubium
- Helicocranchia navossae Judkins et al., 2022
- Helicocranchia papillata (Voss, 1960)
- Helicocranchia pfefferi Massy, 1907 - synonyms include H. beebei
