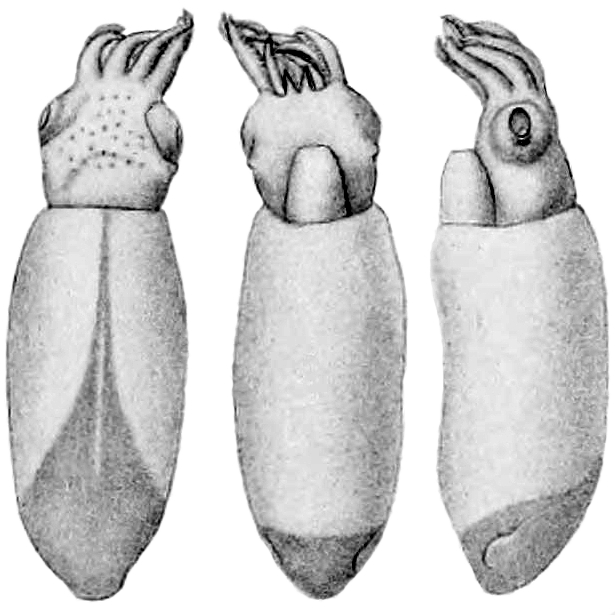

Scientific classification
- Kingdom: Animalia
- Phylum: Mollusca
- Class: Cephalopoda
- Order: Oegopsida
- Family: Cranchiidae
- Genus: Parateuthis; Thiele, 1920
- Species: P. tunicata

Binomial name
- Parateuthis tunicata Thiele, 1920

= Parateuthis =

Genus of squids

Parateuthis tunicata, the only known member of the genus Parateuthis, is the scientific name currently given to a species of squid based on a single specimen. The validity of Parateuthis and of P. tunicata is uncertain. The sole specimen was found in the Antarctic Ocean, and is held in the repository at the Museum für Naturkunde in Berlin, Germany.
