= Egea inermis =

Conservation status
- Least Concern (IUCN 3.1)

Scientific classification
- Kingdom: Animalia
- Phylum: Mollusca
- Class: Cephalopoda
- Order: Oegopsida
- Family: Cranchiidae
- Subfamily: Taoniinae
- Genus: Egea; Joubin, 1933
- Species: E. inermis

Binomial name
- Egea inermis Joubin, 1933

Species of squid

Egea inermis is a species of glass squid in the monotypic genus Egea.

== Description ==
The mantle of Egea inermis is shaped like a spindle, is approximately three times the length of the long and thin fins, and is made up of thin walls. Furthermore, the funnel is quite large and the species includes both a funnel organ and a developed valve. The head in contrast is small in size and includes two big eyes protruding toward the anterior. Both the head and the mantle are connected by a short neck, which therefore constricts the head. Moreover, the arms are short yet strong and include two rows of relatively large suckers. Overall, the best indications that an organism of this species is maturing into an adult are the fins increasing in length, the head and mantle experiencing changes, and the sexual organs developing.

Egea inermis is bioluminescent.

== Geographical distribution ==
Egea inermis is found in both the sub-tropical and tropical Atlantic waters. This species are mostly found close to land, are scattered throughout the open water in the oceans, and follow warm water currents.
