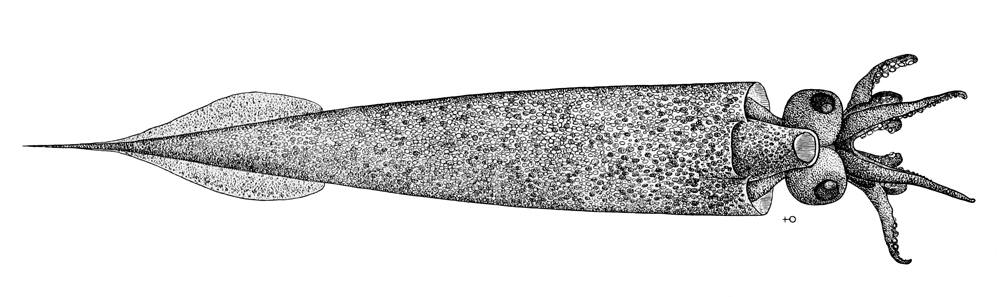

Conservation status
- Least Concern (IUCN 3.1)

Scientific classification
- Kingdom: Animalia
- Phylum: Mollusca
- Class: Cephalopoda
- Order: Oegopsida
- Family: Cranchiidae
- Genus: Taonius
- Species: T. borealis

Binomial name
- Taonius borealis (Nesis, 1972)

Synonyms
- Belonella (pacifica) borealis Nesis, 1972; Belonella borealis Nesis, 1972

= Taonius borealis =

Species of squid

Taonius borealis is a glass squid belonging to the genus Taonius. It is found in the North Pacific Ocean, ranging from Japan to southern California.

Taonius borealis is a transparent to dark purple color. They have tentacles or arms, and each arm consists of two suckers per row. The tentacular club armature consists of four hooked suckers per row, medial suckers with one or two large hooks and several small cusps. Their longest arms can have up to 90 suckers each, rapidly decreasing in size going down the tentacle. Taonius borealis is distinguished by their usually stouter mantle. The maximum size is 45-centimetre (18 in) mantle length. Their regular habitat is mesopelagic to bathypelagic. They mostly feed on shrimps, small fishes, including myctophids, and other squids. Predators include whales, sharks, and squids.
