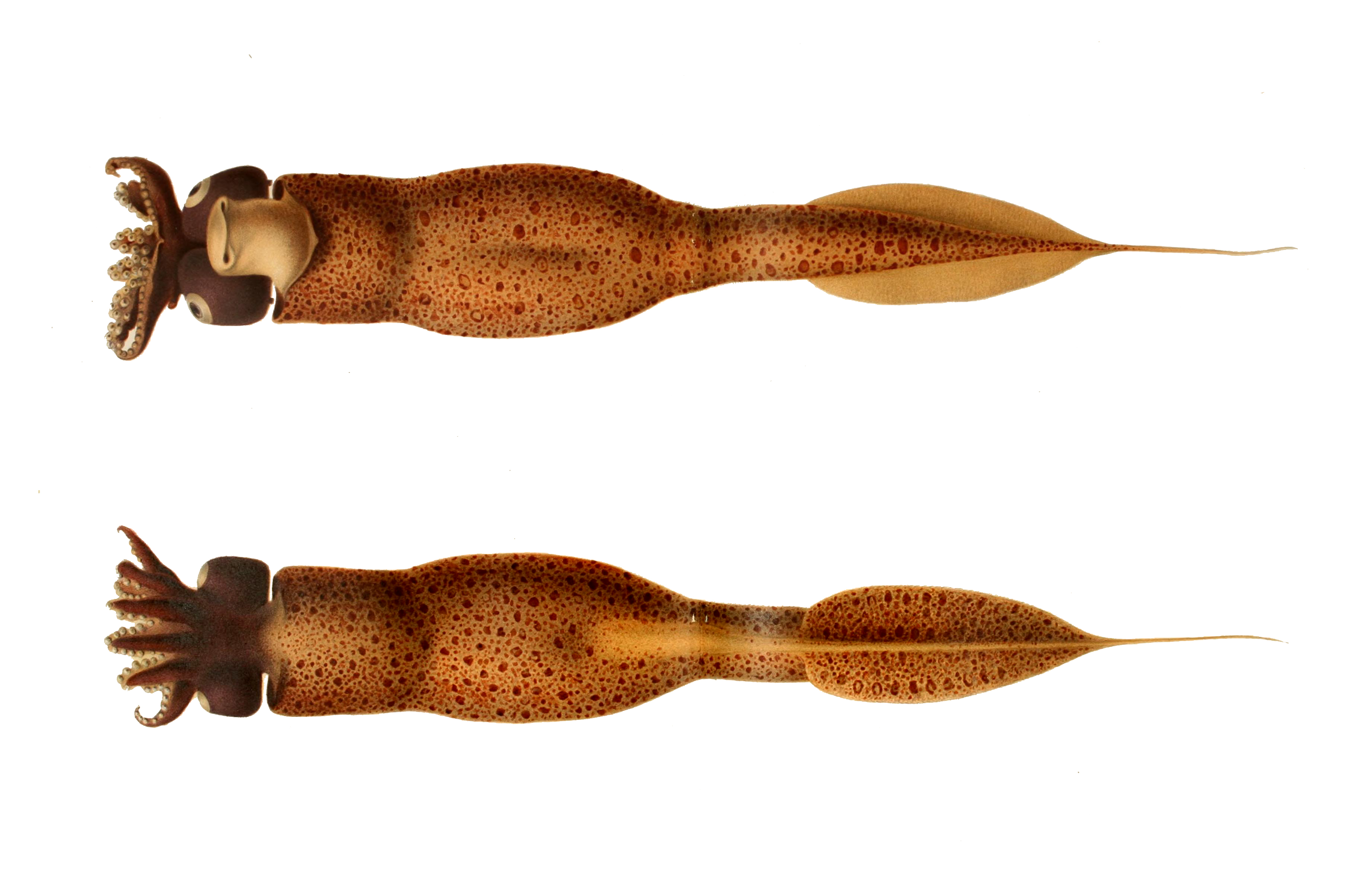
- Drawing of Taonius pavo

Scientific classification
- Domain: Eukaryota
- Kingdom: Animalia
- Phylum: Mollusca
- Class: Cephalopoda
- Order: Oegopsida
- Family: Cranchiidae
- Subfamily: Taoniinae
- Genus: Taonius; Steenstrup, 1861

Type species
- Loligo pavo Lesueur, 1821

Species
- see text

Synonyms
- Belonella Lane, 1957; Desmoteuthis Verrill, 1881; Toxeuma Chun, 1906

= Taonius =

Genus of squids

Taonius is a small genus of glass squid. Although it comprises only three recognised species, it has been suggested there may be as many as five species. Taonius borealis is found in the North Pacific Ocean and Taonius pavo is found in the Atlantic and possibly the south-western Indian Ocean.

Some teuthologists dispute Voss's synonymy of Belonella with Taonius.

The genus contains bioluminescent species.

== Species ==
Three species are currently placed in Taonius:

- Taonius borealis (Nesis, 1972)
- Taonius belone (Chun, 1906)
- Taonius pavo (Lesueur, 1821)

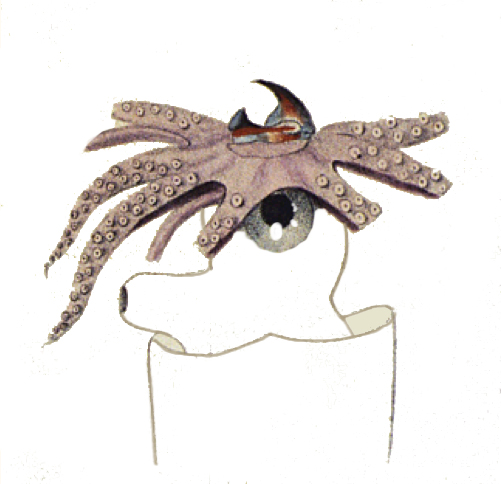
Detail of beak and tentacles of Taonius pavo
