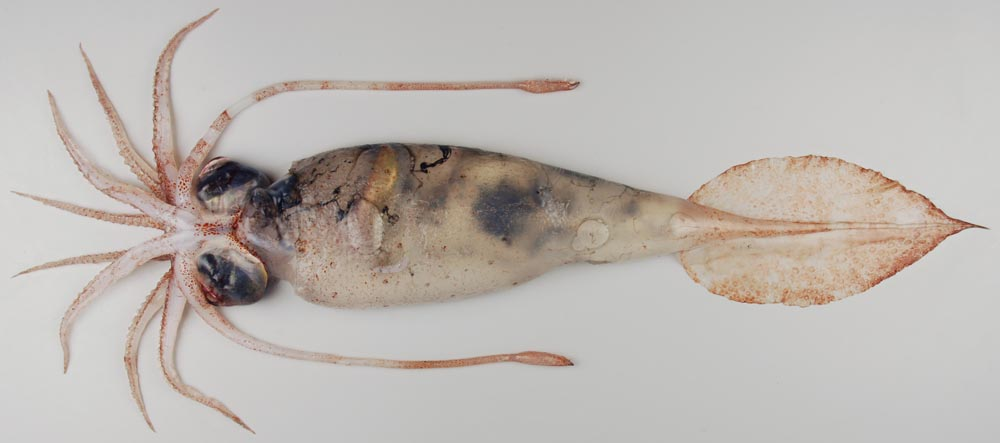
- Ventral view of an adult specimen from the Ross Sea, with a mantle length of 321 mm (12.6 in)
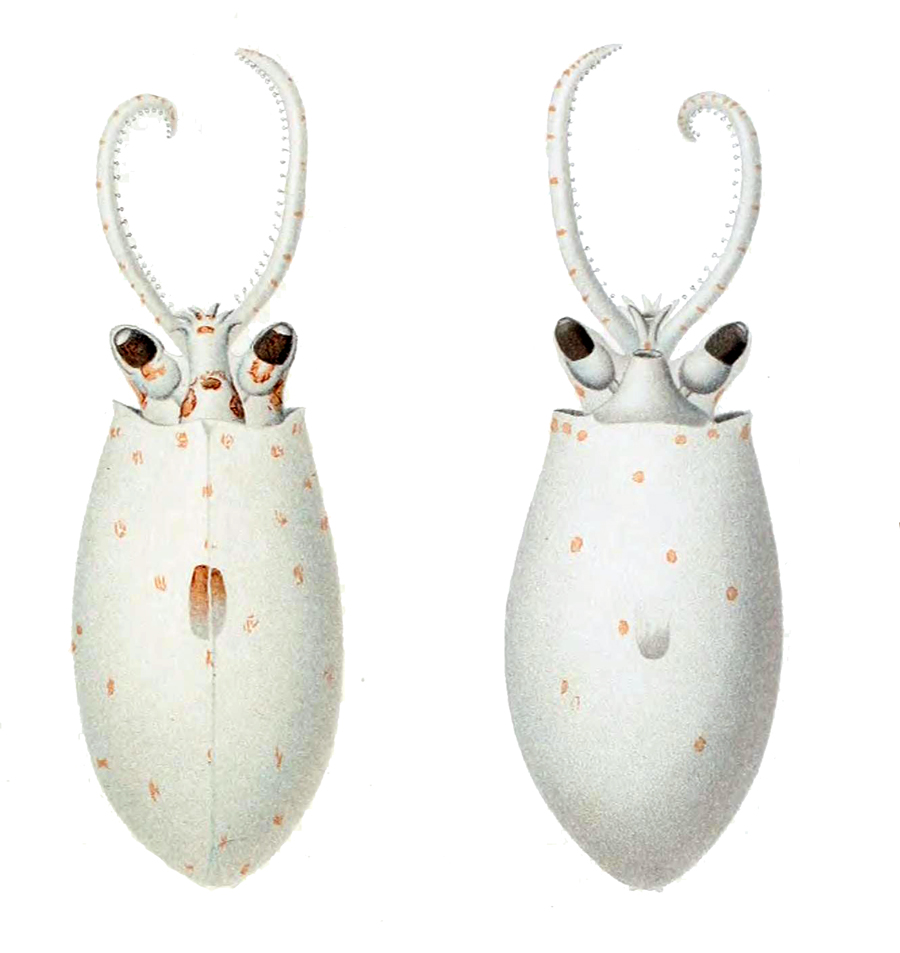
- Illustration of paralarvae (left: dorsal view, right: ventral view)

Conservation status
- Least Concern (IUCN 3.1)

Scientific classification
- Kingdom: Animalia
- Phylum: Mollusca
- Class: Cephalopoda
- Order: Oegopsida
- Family: Cranchiidae
- Genus: Galiteuthis
- Species: G. glacialis

Binomial name
- Galiteuthis glacialis (Chun, 1906)

Synonyms
- Crystalloteuthis glacialis Chun, 1906; Galiteuthis aspera Filippova, 1972; Teuthowenia antarctica Chun, 1910

= Galiteuthis glacialis =

Species of squid

Galiteuthis glacialis or Antarctic cranchiid squid is a species of glass squid from the Antarctic Convergence. It is in the family Cranchiidae and subfamily Taoniinae. They are endemic to the Antarctic and are found in the Southern Ocean, around the Weddell Sea and the South Shetland Islands. Galiteuthis glacialis are one of the most plentiful and widely dispersed species of Antarctic squid. These squids are found in the mesopelagic and bathypelagic layers of the open ocean and demonstrate vertical migration. They can reach a maximum mantle length of 50 cm (20 in).

== Distribution ==
Galiteuthis glacialis is found predominantly in the Southern Ocean. It occupies the northern and eastern parts of the Weddell Sea, but is less abundant in the Southernmost part. This species prefers the open ocean and steep continental slope of the Eastern Weddell Sea. They are also found around the South Shetland Islands. As G. glacialis matures and its mantle size increases, it moves to deeper water. In its early life stages it is distributed between 300–1000 m. Mature squids are found more commonly below 700 m.

They also show vertical distribution patterns and undergo diurnal vertical migration. Paralarvae and juveniles live in the epipelagic and mesopelagic zones and live at a depth of 300–400 m during the day, migrating to 200–300 m at night. Adolescents and adults live in the lower mesopelagic and bathypelagic zones at depths of 500–2500 m. The upper limit of this species' migration is due to the higher temperature and lower salinity (less than 34.2 parts per thousand) of shallow Antarctic waters. There is also a seasonal vertical distribution pattern in which mature squids prefer to remain below the warmer, less saline surface layer of water in the summer and venture to shallower depths in the fall.

== Morphology ==
Galiteuthis glacialis has a transparent body; mature squids have a gelatinous texture and adolescents have a leathery, muscular texture. Their narrow mantle is covered in sharp tubercles anteriorly and medially. The fin is lancet shaped with its posterior end resembling a short, thin needle. They have a small head and large eyes with two photophores. However in this species, the photophores are not proven to produce light. This squid has a large stomach and small caecum, potentially due to the lack of food sources in deeper water. A larger stomach serves as an energy store of partially digested material that can later be released to the caecum for full digestion, which allows them to retain food during times of scarcity. This species also shows isometric growth of its body parts.

== Ecology ==
This squid is preyed upon by sea birds, marine mammals, and fish. Southern elephant seals prey minimally on G. glacialis and equally on males and females. Likewise, they have been recorded to only prey on adults rather than juveniles. Black-browed albatrosses and grey-headed albatrosses also prefer feeding on adults more than juveniles. However albatrosses are not able to reach the adults because they cannot deep-dive. Tissue degeneration and upwelling bring mature squids up to the surface of the water for predation. Digested parts of G. glacialis have been found in the stomachs of a species of icefish native to the Southern Ocean.

Galiteuthis glacialis are opportunistic feeders and prey upon whatever is available. Their prey are likely mesopelagic zooplankton that feed on sinking organic matter. Though, their common prey are crustaceans, chaetognatha, and fish.

== Life cycle ==
Galiteuthis glacialis paralarvae hatch in the bathypelagic layer and rise passively to the upper layers of the water. Then, they get dispersed in the epipelagic and mostly mesopelagic zones. The onset of maturation begins in the bathypelagic zone, and as the paralarvae mature, they begin to shift vertically (diurnal vertical migration). Females will spawn in the deeper water of the bathypelagic zone and then experience tissue degeneration. The degeneration increases their buoyancy, causing them to float all the way to the surface of the water.

== Reproduction ==
Spawning occurs in deep water where predation is lowest. Females have oval oocytes and males have spermatophores. During copulation the male will grasp the mantle of the female and deposit sperm onto the female's outer dorsal mantle surface. It is hypothesized that the spermatophores dissolve an area of the female's mantle in order to get to the inner mantle surface. This is achieved by a chemical mechanism, most likely enzymatic, and the female could die from bacterial infection of an open wound before spawning can happen.

After successful spawning, females undergo gelatinous tissue degeneration, losing their musculature and experiencing lower hydration and egg spawning. This alters the females' natural buoyancy and forces them to float upwards towards the surface. Males do not undergo degeneration. It is speculated that males die after mating and sink to the seafloor which may explain why mature females are caught in nets much more frequently than mature males, which are rarely caught.
