= Liguriella =

Conservation status
- Data Deficient (IUCN 3.1)

Scientific classification
- Kingdom: Animalia
- Phylum: Mollusca
- Class: Cephalopoda
- Order: Oegopsida
- Family: Cranchiidae
- Genus: Liguriella; Issel, 1908
- Species: L. podopthalma

Binomial name
- Liguriella podopthalma Issel, 1908

Genus of squids

Liguriella is a genus of glass squids, the genus is probably monotypic, the only species being Liguriella podophthalma. The other named species Liguriella pardus, which was described by S. Stillman Berry in 1916, is cited as a taxon inquirendum but it is suggested that there may be in fact more than one species and there are species yet to be described.

== Description ==
Liguriella podophthalma is a moderate sized squid, attaining a mantle length of at least 243mm. The tentacles have a tentacular club which only have suckers, there is no carpal cluster and the stalks have two rows of suckers and knobs. The funnel has no valve and the funnel organ has a dorsal pad which has three papillae. There are tubercles at the join of the funnel and the mantle. The fins are inserted posterior at the distal end of the gladius and only the anterior edge of the fins is not so inserted into the gladius. The eye contains two photophores which run together and there are no photophores on the arms. The contiguous photophores on the eyes are unusual within the Cranchiidae and are only shared with Sandalops.

== Distribution ==
Liguriella podophthalma occurs around the world where it can be found in the tropical, subtropical and northern sub-Antarctic waters of the oceans.

== Habitat and ecology ==
The overall vertical distribution of Liguriella podophthalma extends from just below the surface to depths of over 1000m to 1500m. The paralarvae and juveniles of less than 40mm mantle length occur in the upper water column to 400m. As they mature they migrate to progressively greater depths, an ontogenetic descent, and this reaches to about 1500 m, the depth at which the largest individual collected to date was recorded, it had a mantle length of 243mm and was a subadult.
