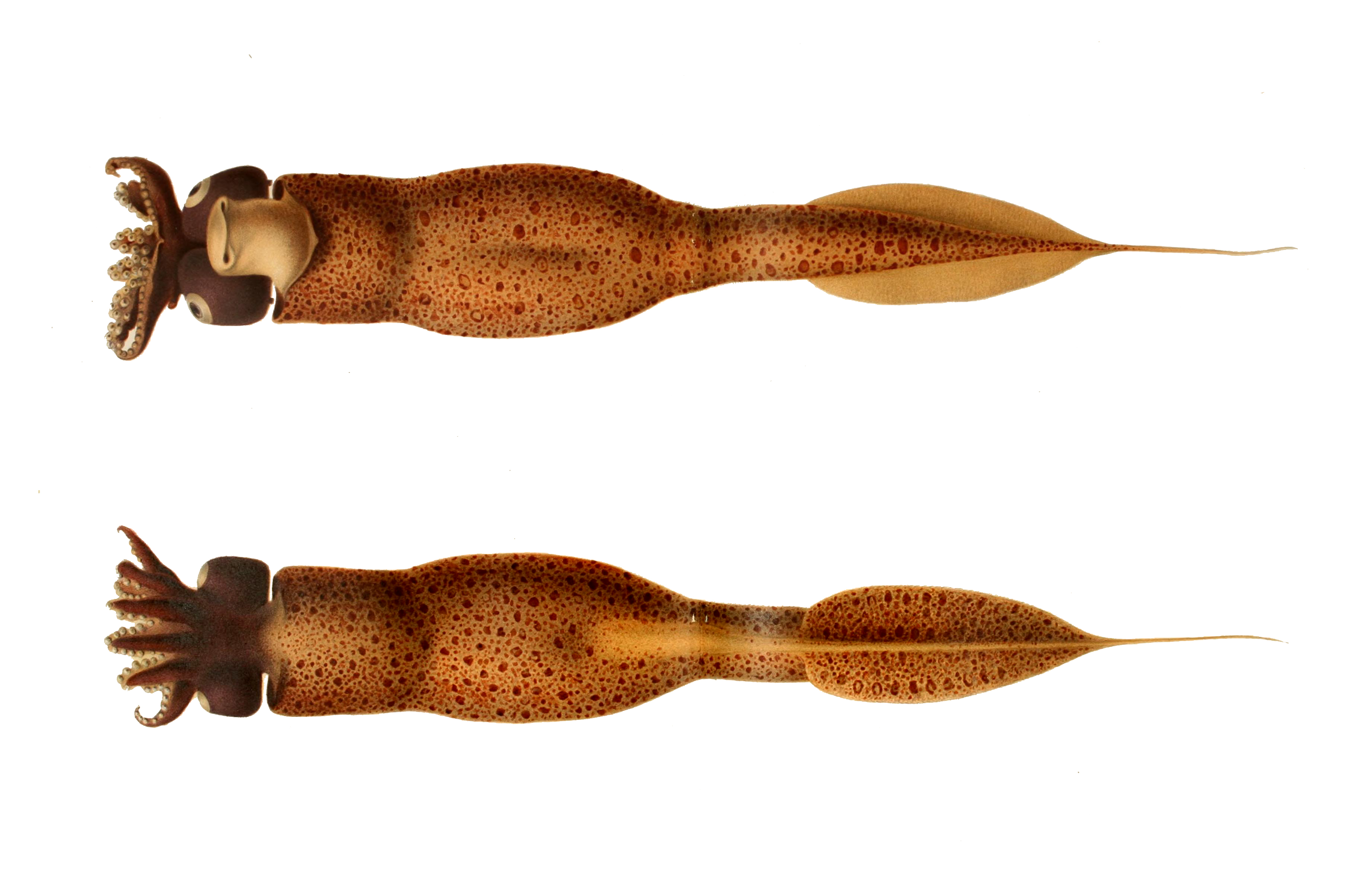
- Drawing of Taonius pavo

Conservation status
- Least Concern (IUCN 3.1)

Scientific classification
- Kingdom: Animalia
- Phylum: Mollusca
- Class: Cephalopoda
- Order: Oegopsida
- Family: Cranchiidae
- Genus: Taonius
- Species: T. pavo

Binomial name
- Taonius pavo (Lesueur, 1821)

Synonyms
- Loligo pavo Lesueur, 1821

= Taonius pavo =

Species of squid

Taonius pavo is a species of glass squid found in the Atlantic Ocean. Its exact geographic distribution is uncertain, but it may extend to the southwestern Indian Ocean through the Agulhas Current.

They are eaten by the sperm whale in Southeast Asia, southern Australia, Hawaii, and North Atlantic waters.

== See also ==
- Teuthowenia megalops
