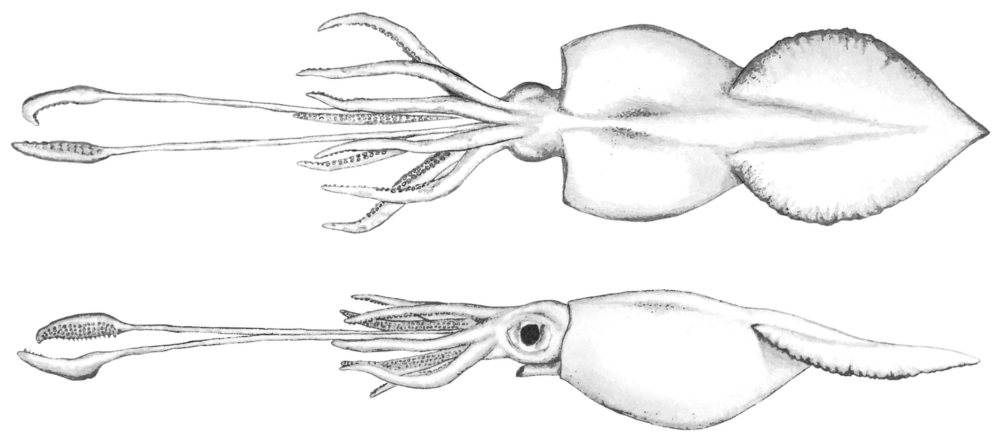
- Depiction with an inflated mantle
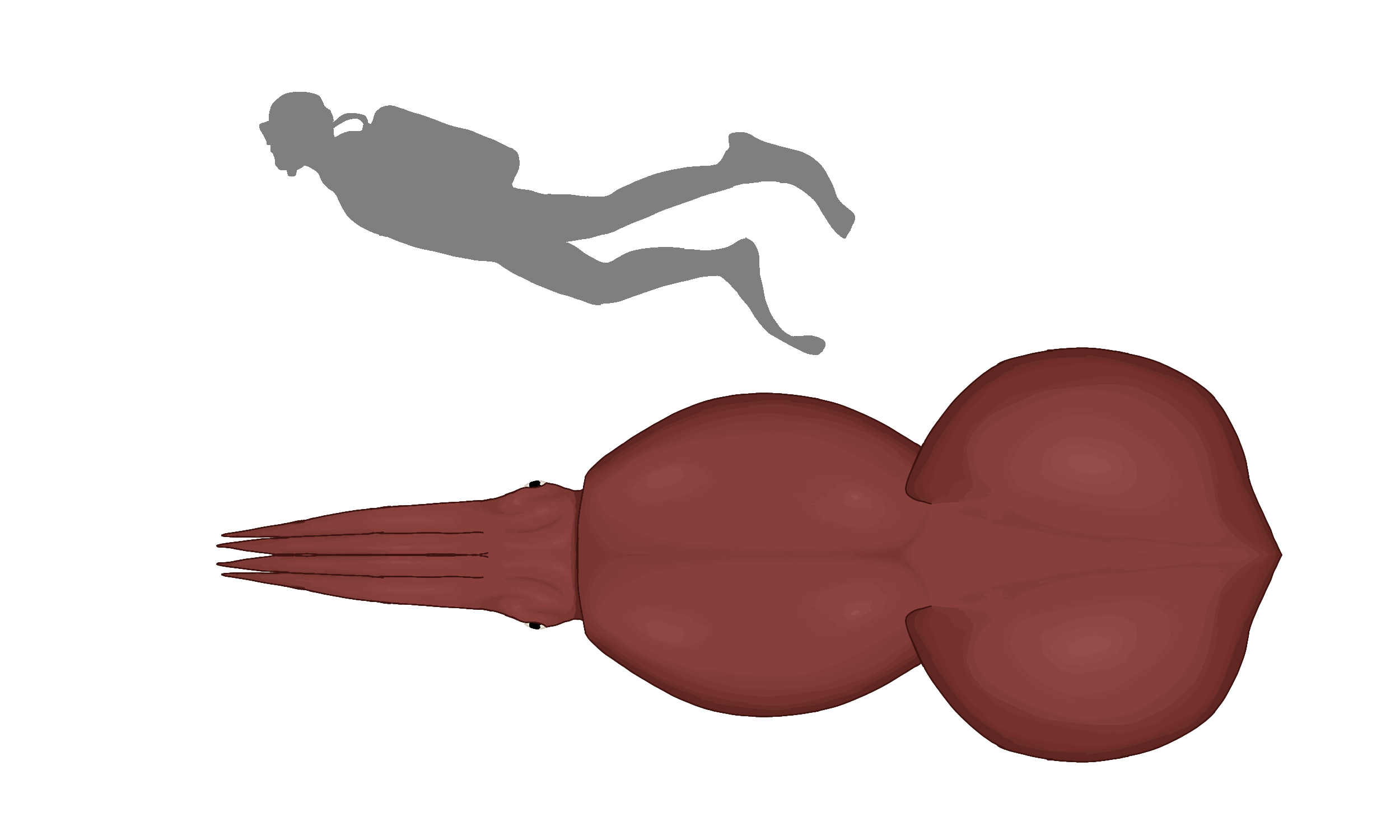
- The largest measured colossal squid (without tentacles) compared to a human

Conservation status
- Least Concern (IUCN 3.1)

Scientific classification
- Kingdom: Animalia
- Phylum: Mollusca
- Class: Cephalopoda
- Order: Oegopsida
- Family: Cranchiidae
- Subfamily: Taoniinae
- Genus: Mesonychoteuthis; Robson, 1925
- Species: M. hamiltoni

Binomial name
- Mesonychoteuthis hamiltoni Robson, 1925
- Global range of M. hamiltoni

= Colossal squid =

Species of massive squid

The colossal squid (Mesonychoteuthis hamiltoni) is a species of very large squid belonging to the family Cranchiidae, that of the cockatoo squids, or glass squids. It is sometimes called the Antarctic cranch squid or giant squid (not to be confused with the giant squid in genus Architeuthis) and is believed to be the largest squid species in terms of mass. It is the only recognized member of the genus Mesonychoteuthis.

The species is confirmed to have a mass of at least 495 kilograms (1,091 lb), although some specimens, known only from beaks found in sperm whale stomachs, may have weighed as much as 600–700 kilograms (1,300–1,500 lb), making the squid the largest extant invertebrate. The maximum total length is ~4.2 metres (14 ft). Larger estimates exist; however, these include the feeding tentacles measured on dead specimens. In life the squid's tentacles are hidden, only released when capturing prey. If tentacles are considered, lengths of 10 metres (33 ft) and 14 metres (46 ft) exist, but the former estimate is more likely. The colossal squid has the largest eyes of any documented animal, with an estimated diameter of 27–30 cm (11–12 in) to 40 cm (16 in) for the largest collected specimen.

The species has anatomy similar to that of other members of its family, although it is the only member of Cranchiidae to display hooks on its arms, suckers, and tentacles. It is known to inhabit the circumantarctic Southern Ocean. It is presumed to be an ambush predator, with a diet including various fish, and is likely a key prey item of the sperm whale.

== Morphology ==
The colossal squid shares features common to all squids: a mantle for locomotion, one pair of gills, a beak or tooth, and certain external characteristics like eight arms and two tentacles, a head, and two fins. In general, the morphology and anatomy of the colossal squid are the same as any other squid. However, there are certain morphological characteristics that separate the colossal squid from other squids in its family: the colossal squid is the only squid in its family whose arms and tentacles are equipped with hooks, either swiveling or three-pointed. There are squids in other families that also have hooks, but no other squid in the family Cranchiidae.

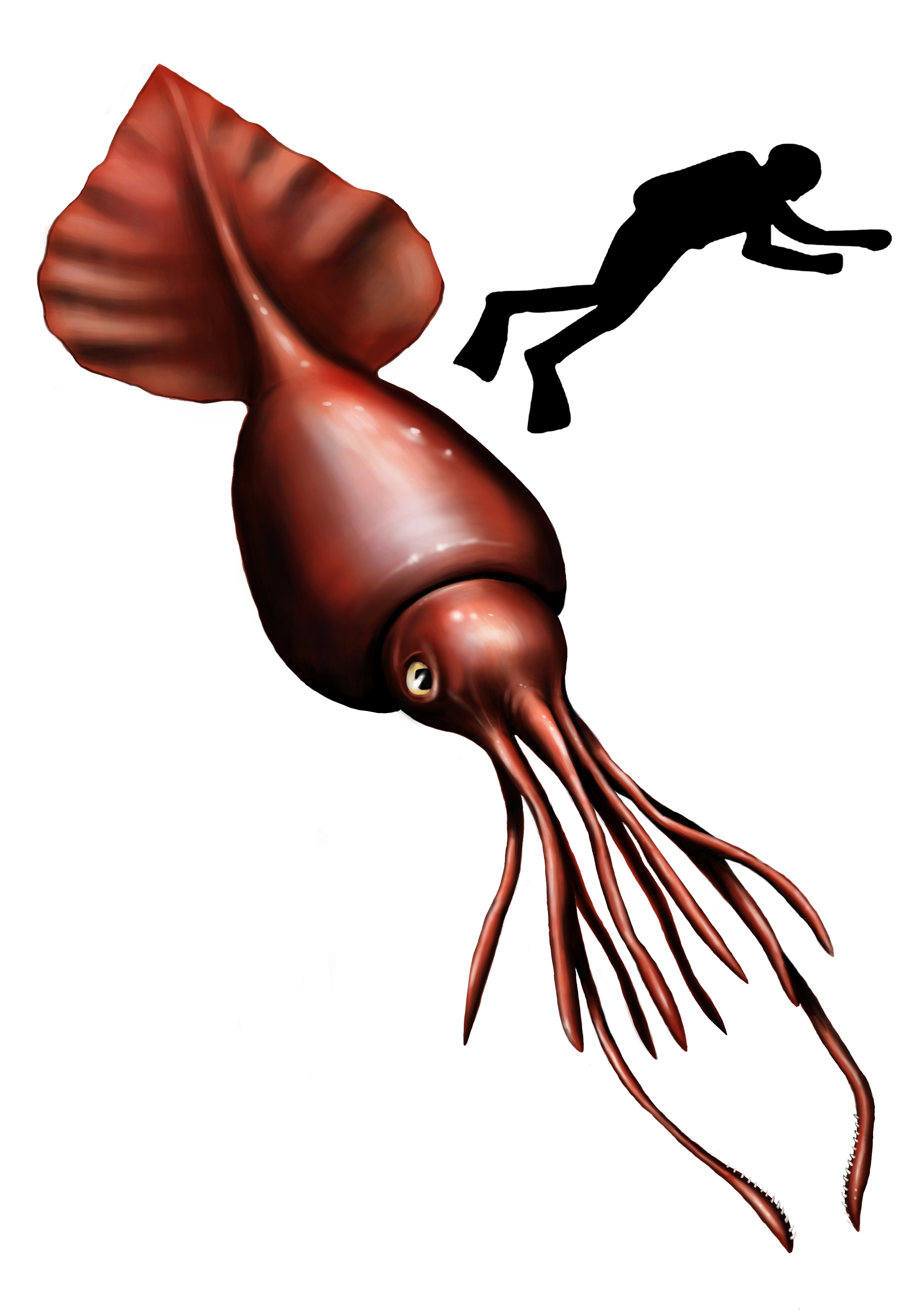
Size comparison with a human

Unlike most squid species, the colossal squid exhibits abyssal gigantism, as it is the heaviest living invertebrate species, reaching weights up to 495 kg (1,091 lb). For comparison, squids typically have a mantle length of about 30 cm (12 in) and weigh about 100–200 g (3 1/2–7 oz).

The colossal squid also has the largest eyes documented in the animal kingdom, with a diameter of 27–30 cm (11–12 in).

== Distribution and habitat ==
The squid's known range extends thousands of kilometres north of Antarctica to southern South America, southern South Africa, and the southern tip of New Zealand, making it primarily an inhabitant of the circumantarctic Southern Ocean. Colossal squid are also often sighted near Cooperation Sea and Ross Sea because of its prey and competitor, the Antarctic toothfish. The region between the Weddell Sea and the western Kerguelen archipelago has been deemed a "hotspot" based on characteristics of the habitat. The squid's vertical distribution appears to correlate directly with age. Young squid are found between 0–500 m (0–1,640 ft), adolescent squid are found 500–2,000 m (1,600–6,600 ft) and adult squid are found primarily within the mesopelagic (approximately 200 to 1,000 meters below the surface) and bathypelagic regions (1,000 to 4,000 m below the surface) of the open ocean.

== Behavior ==
=== Feeding ===
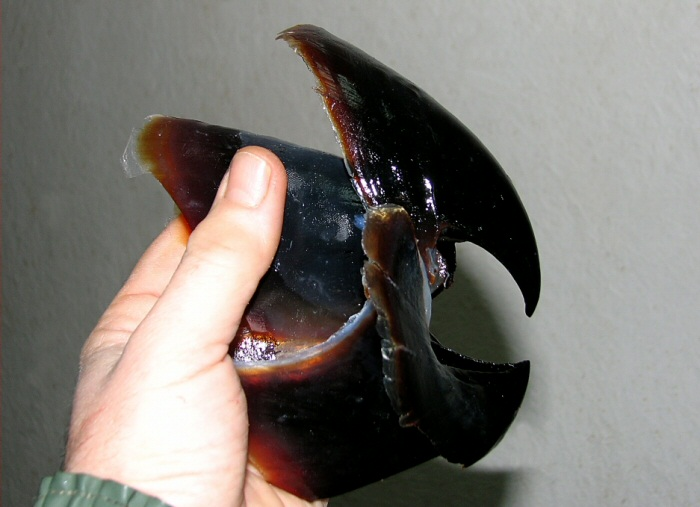
The beak of a colossal squid

While little is known about their behavior, colossal squid are thought to feed primarily on small fish, such as lanternfish and deep-sea smelt, which have been found as stomach contents in adult specimens. They also attack larger fish; of 8,000 Antarctic toothfish brought aboard by trawlers between 2011 and 2014, seventy-one showed clear signs of attack by colossal squid. A study in the Prydz Bay region of Antarctica found squid remains in a female colossal squid's stomach, suggesting the possibility of cannibalism within this species. Studies measuring the δ^{15}N content of the chitinous beaks of cephalopods to determine trophic ecology levels have demonstrated that the colossal squid is a top predator that is positively correlated with its increased size. This new confirmation of the colossal squid's trophic level suggests that it likely preys on large fishes, such as the Patagonian toothfish, and smaller squids, according to its size, and that its predators include sperm whales and sleeper sharks.

=== Metabolism ===
The colossal squid is thought to have a very slow metabolic rate, needing only around 30 grams (1 oz) of prey daily for an adult with a mass of 500 kilograms (1,100 lb). Estimates of its energy requirements suggest it is a slow-moving ambush predator, using its large eyes primarily for prey-detection rather than engaging in active hunting.

=== Predation ===
Many sperm whales have scars on their backs that are thought to be caused by the hooks of colossal squid. Colossal squid are a major prey item for sperm whales in the Antarctic; 14% of the squid beaks found in the stomachs of these sperm whales are those of the colossal squid, which indicates that colossal squid likely make up 77% of the biomass consumed by these whales. Many other animals also feed on colossal squid, including the beaked whales, such as southern bottlenose whales and Cuvier's and Baird's beaked whales. Other possible predators include the pilot whale, killer whales, larger southern elephant seals, Patagonian toothfish, southern sleeper sharks (Somniosus antarcticus), Antarctic toothfish, and albatrosses (e.g., the wandering and sooty albatrosses). Beaks from mature adults have only been recovered from large predators (i.e. sperm whales and southern sleeper sharks), while other predators only eat juveniles or young adults.

=== Reproduction ===
Not much is known about the colossal squid's reproductive cycle, although it does have two distinct sexes. Many species of squid, however, develop sex-specific organs as they age and develop. The adult female colossal squid has been discovered in much shallower waters, likely implying that females spawn in shallower waters rather than at their usual depth. Additionally, the colossal squid has a high possible fecundity reaching over 4.2 million oocytes, which is quite high compared to other squids in such cold waters. Colossal squid oocytes have been observed at sizes ranging from as large as 3.2 mm × 2.1 mm to as small as 1.4 mm × 0.5 mm. Sampling of colossal squid ovaries show an average of 2,175 eggs per gram. Young squid are thought to spawn near the summer time at surface temperatures from −0.9 to 0 °C (30.4 to 32.0 °F).

=== Vision ===
For pelagic organisms of similar weight to the colossal squid, such as the swordfish, the average eye diameter required for visual detection is 10 cm, but the colossal squid's are as large as 30 cm (12 in). This allows for an increase in visual detection strategies, including reduced diffraction blurring and greater contrast distinction, which must be extremely beneficial to the colossal squid to justify the large energetic expenses to grow, move, camouflage, and maintain these eyes. The colossal squid's increased pupil size has been mathematically proven to overcome the visual complications of the pelagic zone (the combination of downwelling daylight, bioluminescence, and light scattering with increasing distance), especially by monitoring larger volumes of water at once and by detecting long-range changes in plankton bioluminescence via the physical disruption of large moving objects (e.g., sperm whales).

The colossal squid's eyes glow in the dark via long, rectangular light-producing photophores located next to the lens on the front of both eyeballs. Symbiotic bacteria reside within these photophores and luminesce through chemical reaction.

It is hypothesized that the colossal squid's eyes can detect predator movement beyond 120 m (390 ft), which is the upper limit of the sperm whale's sonar range.

=== Hearing ===
Squid have been found to detect the movement of sound waves via organs called statocysts (similar to the human cochlea). Squid statocysts likely respond to low-frequency sounds less than 500 Hz, similar to pelagic fish. Colossal squid are likely essentially deaf to high frequencies, such as whale sonar, so they rely largely on visual detection mechanisms to avoid predation.

== History of discovery ==
The colossal squid, species Mesonychoteuthis hamiltoni, was discovered in 1925. This species belongs to the class Cephalopoda and family Cranchiidae.

In 1981, an adult specimen was discovered; in 2003, a second specimen was collected. Captured in 2007, the largest colossal squid weighed 495 kilograms (1,091 lb), and is now on display at the Museum of New Zealand Te Papa Tongarewa.

Most of the time, full colossal squid specimens are not collected; as of 2015, only 12 complete colossal squids had ever been recorded, with only half of these being full adults. Beak remnants of the colossal squid are commonly collected; 55 beaks of colossal squids have been recorded in total. Less commonly (four times), a fin, mantle, arm, or tentacle of a colossal squid has been collected.

=== First collected specimens ===
The species was first discovered in the form of two arm crowns found in the stomach of a sperm whale in the winter of 1924–1925. This species, named Mesonychoteuthis hamiltoni after E. Hamilton who made the initial discovery, was formally described by Guy Coburn Robson in 1925.

=== Entire collected specimens ===
In 1981, a Soviet trawler in the Ross Sea, off the coast of Antarctica, caught a large squid with a total length of over 4 m (13 ft), which was later identified as an immature female of M. hamiltoni. In 2003, a complete specimen of a subadult female was found near the surface with a total length of 6 m (20 ft) and a mantle length of 2.5 m (8 feet 3 inches). In 2005, the first full living specimen was captured at a depth of 1,625 m (5,331 ft) while taking a toothfish from a longline off South Georgia Island. Although the mantle was not brought aboard, its length was estimated at over 2.5 m (8 feet 3 inches), and the tentacles measured 2.3 metres (7 feet 7 inches). The animal is thought to have weighed between 150 and 200 kg (330 and 440 lb).

=== Largest known specimen ===
This specimen, caught in February 2007, is the largest cephalopod ever recorded. Here it is shown alive during capture, with the delicate red skin still intact and the mantle characteristically inflated.

The largest recorded specimen was a female, which are thought to be larger than males, captured in February 2007 by a New Zealand fishing boat in the Ross Sea off Antarctica. The squid was close to death when it was captured and subsequently was taken back to New Zealand for scientific study. The specimen was initially estimated to measure about 10 metres in total length and weigh about 450 kg.

==== Defrosting and dissection, April–May 2008 ====
Thawing and dissection of the specimen took place at the Museum of New Zealand Te Papa Tongarewa. AUT biologist Steve O'Shea, Tsunemi Kubodera, and AUT biologist Kat Bolstad were invited to the museum to aid in the process, joined by marine ecologist Mark Fenwick and Dutch scientist Olaf Blaauw. Media reports suggested scientists at the museum were considering using a giant microwave to defrost the squid because thawing it at room temperature would take several days and it would likely begin to decompose on the outside while the core remained frozen. However, they later opted for the more conventional approach of thawing the specimen in a bath of salt water. After thawing, it was found that the specimen was 495 kg with a mantle length of 2.5 m and a total length of only 4.2 m, probably because the tentacles shrank once the squid was dead.

Parts of the specimen have been examined:

- The beak is considerably smaller than some found in the stomachs of sperm whales, suggesting that some other colossal squid are much larger than this one.
- The eye is 27 cm (10 1/2 in) wide, with a lens 12 cm (4 1/2 in) across. This is the largest eye of any known animal. These measurements are of the partly collapsed specimen; when the squid was alive, the eye was probably 30 to 40 cm (12 to 16 in) across.
- Inspection of the specimen with an endoscope revealed ovaries containing thousands of eggs.

==== Exhibition ====
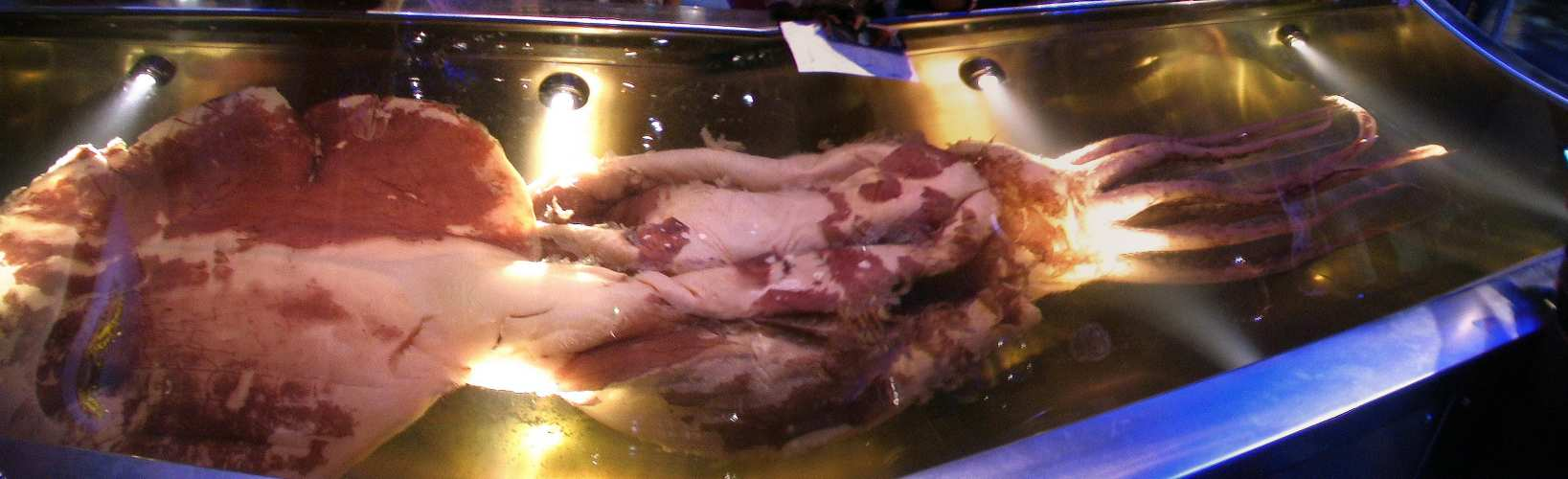
The specimen on display at the Museum of New Zealand Te Papa Tongarewa

The Museum of New Zealand Te Papa Tongarewa began displaying this specimen from 13 December 2008. The exhibition was closed between 2018 and 2019, but it was reopened for public viewing at Te Papa.

=== Filming in natural habitat ===
In 2022–23 there were several attempts made by scientists, including an ocean exploration non-profit called KOLOSSAL, to find and film the colossal squid in its natural habitat for the first time to learn more about its biology and ecological behavior. The science team used a tourism vessel to survey 36 locations throughout the Southern Ocean and may have filmed a small juvenile colossal squid for the first time. Researchers have confirmed that that video is of a species of glass squid, but due to marine snow, the footage has been harder to confirm without a DNA analysis, and may instead represent Galiteuthis glacialis or a new species of glass squid unknown to science.

The first confirmed colossal squid filmed by Schmidt Ocean Institute

On 9 March 2025, for the first time, a confirmed colossal squid was filmed in its natural environment during an expedition near the South Sandwich Islands in the South Atlantic Ocean. The squid, a juvenile measuring around 30 cm (12 in) long, was captured on video at a depth of 600 m (2,000 ft) by the Schmidt Ocean Institute's remotely operated vehicle (ROV) SuBastian.

== Conservation status ==
The colossal squid has been assessed as a species of "least concern" on the IUCN Red List. Colossal squid are not targeted by fishers; rather, they are only caught when they attempt to feed on fish caught on hooks. Additionally, due to their habitat, interactions between humans and colossal squid are considered rare.

== See also ==
- Giant squid
- Kraken
