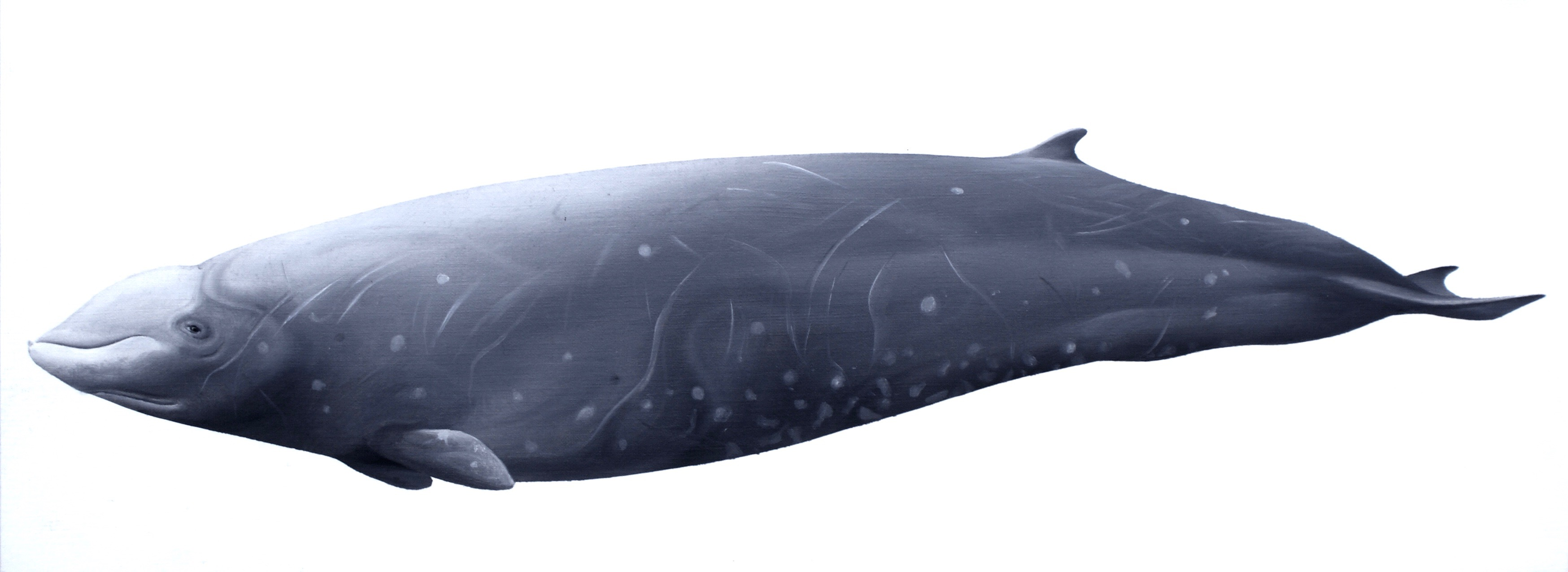

- Size compared to an average human

Conservation status
- Least Concern (IUCN 3.1)

- Apparently Secure (NatureServe)
- CITES Appendix II

Scientific classification
- Kingdom: Animalia
- Phylum: Chordata
- Class: Mammalia
- Order: Artiodactyla
- Infraorder: Cetacea
- Family: Ziphiidae
- Genus: Ziphius; Cuvier, 1823
- Species: Z. cavirostris

Binomial name
- Ziphius cavirostris Cuvier, 1823
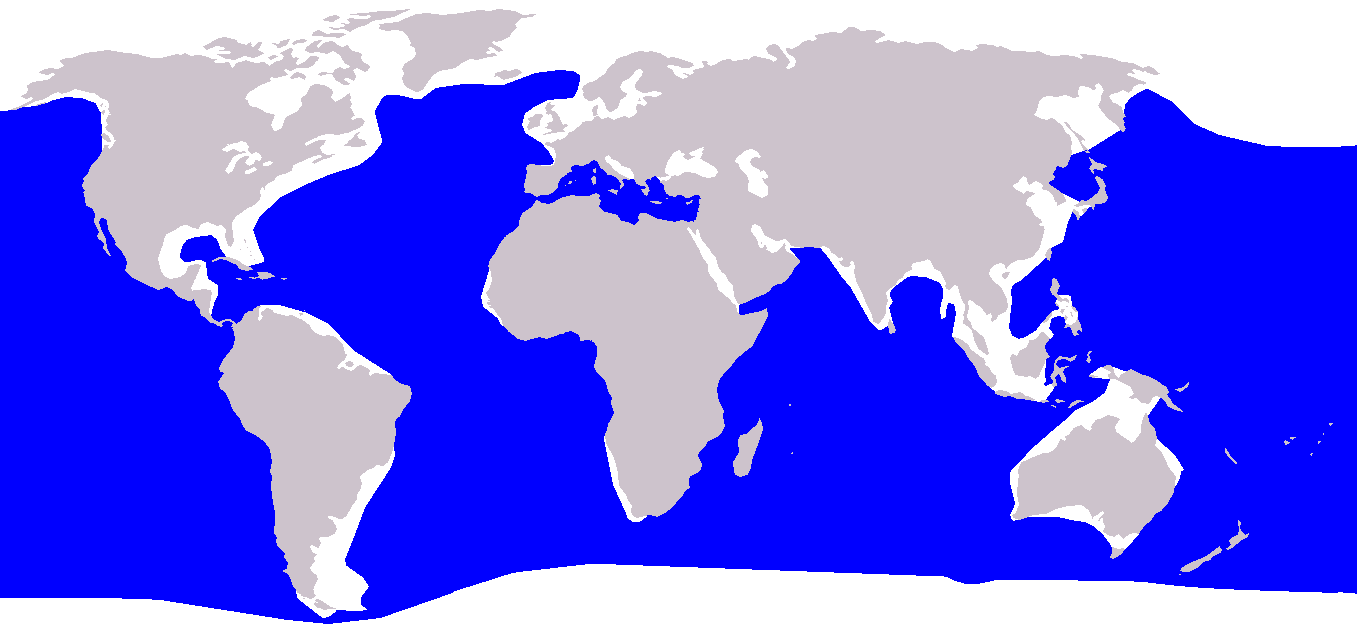
- Range of Cuvier's beaked whale

= Cuvier's beaked whale =

Cuvier's beaked whale Temporal range: Pliocene-recent

Species of whale

Cuvier's beaked whale, goose-beaked whale, or ziphius (Ziphius cavirostris) is the most widely distributed of all beaked whales in the family Ziphiidae. It is among the largest beaked whales but smaller than most baleen whales, reaching lengths of about 4.5–8 metres (15–26 ft) and weights of 1,800–3,100 kg (4,000–6,800 lb).

This species is pelagic, inhabiting deep offshore waters far from coastlines, typically deeper than 1,000 metres (3,300 ft). They reside mostly in temperate, tropical, and subtropical areas of the Atlantic, Pacific, and Indian Oceans.

Cuvier's beaked whale holds the record for both the deepest and longest recorded dives among mammals. Recorded dives have reached depths of 2,992 m (9,816 ft) and durations of 222 minutes.

Although the species is currently listed as Least Concern by the International Union of Conservation of Nature, it faces several anthropogenic (human-made) threats, including entanglement in fishing gear, hunting, and ocean noise.

== Anatomy and morphology ==
=== Description ===
The body of Cuvier's beaked whale is robust and cigar-shaped, similar to those of other beaked whales. Adult Cuvier beaked whales vary in length from 4.5–8 metres (15–26 ft) and weights of 1,800–3,100 kg (4,000–6,800 lb). Males and females tend to be similar in size; however, females are sometimes found to be bigger.

The colour is variable among individuals and between sexes. Adult males are typically a dark grey over most of their body, with the head being slightly lighter grey or even white. Females vary from dark grey to a reddish-brown, and their head lightening is usually less pronounced.

Adult males often bear numerous scars along their bodies. These marks can be used to identify individuals. The scars are believed to be from battles between other males, as well as interactions with predators, such as cookiecutter sharks and lampreys. The frequency of scarring is higher in males than in females, and tends to increase with age.

=== Head and facial anatomy ===
Their head is relatively short and blunt compared with other beaked whales. The forehead slopes gradually toward a small, poorly defined beak (rostrum). In profile, the species' rostrum gives it a goose-like appearance, which is the origin of the alternative name of "goose-beaked whale". Like other toothed whales, it has a melon, a rounded structure of fatty tissue in the forehead that helps focus echolocation sounds used for navigation and hunting.

=== Teeth ===
Cuvier's beaked whale is an odontocete (toothed whale). However, visible erupted teeth are only present in the adult males. Males also develop a pair of tusk-like teeth in the right and left corners of their lower jaw. These teeth are thought to be used for dueling between the males, although their exact function has not been directly observed.

=== Lifespan and reproduction ===
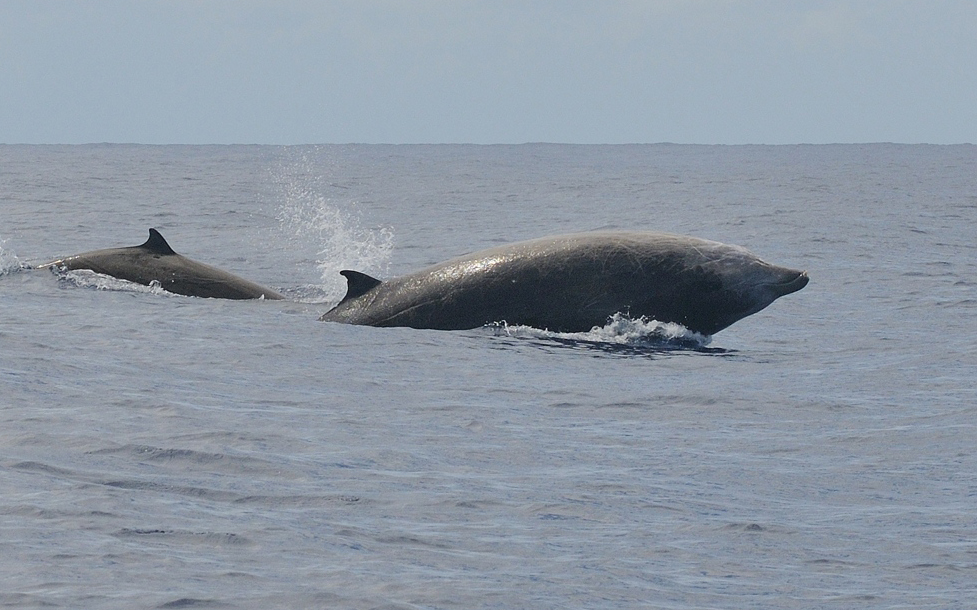
A pod swimming off Dominica.

Newborn calves are approximately 2–3 m (6 ft 7 in – 9 ft 10 in) long and weigh about 250–300 kg (550–660 lb) at birth. Calves are typically black or dark blue with a lighter underside.

Females reach maturity at an average length of 5.8–6.7 m (19–22 ft) and males at 5.0–7.0 m (16.4–23.0 ft), weighing about 2 to 3.5 tonnes. Cuvier's beaked whale can live for up to 60 years.

Cuvier's beaked whales reach sexual maturity at 11 years old. Breeding and calving occurs all throughout the year, but often in the spring time. The gestation period lasts around 12 months until females give birth to a single calf at a time. This occurs about every two to three years. Cuvier's are typically found in small groups, from two to seven individuals, or up to 30–40 individuals, which likely plays a role in mating behaviour.

== Distribution and habitat ==
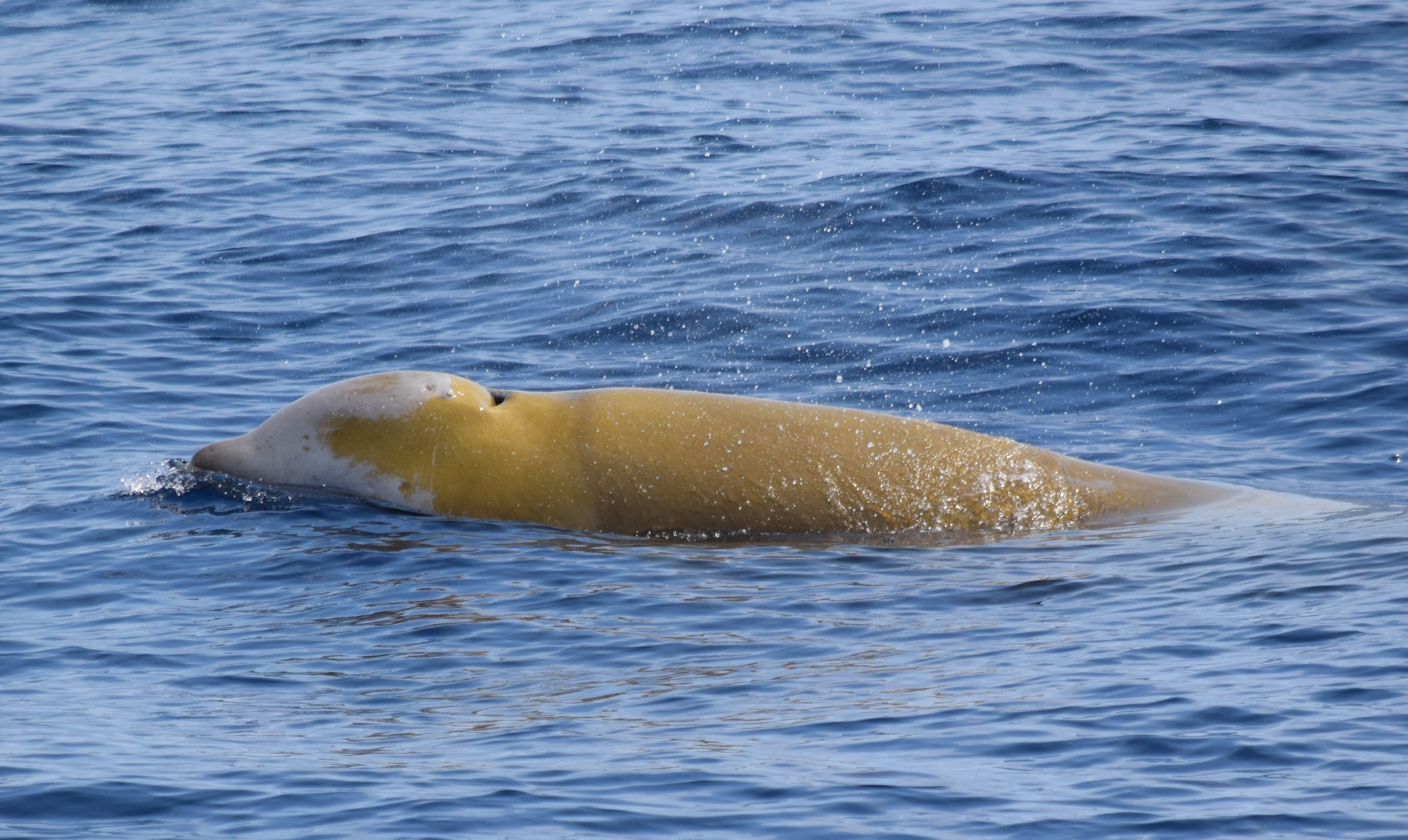
Cuvier's beaked whale surfaces in the Pelagos Sanctuary for Mediterranean Marine Mammals in the Ligurian Sea.

Cuvier's beaked whale has a cosmopolitan distribution, meaning it resides in many oceans across the world. The species occurs mostly in temperate, tropical, and subtropical waters, but its range extends into cooler temperate regions. It is found primarily in deep offshore waters of the Atlantic, Pacific, and Indian Oceans, as well as the semi-enclosed seas such as the Mediterranean Sea and the Gulf of Mexico, but avoids (or is very rare in) shallow seas like the North and Baltic Seas.

Cuvier's beaked whales are strongly associated with deep ocean habitats, usually in waters deeper than 1,000 m (3,300 ft). They are often found near underwater features such as continental slopes, submarine canyons and seamounts where their prey species are abundant.

Cuvier's beaked whale is thought to be one of the most widespread and abundant of the beaked whales. Global population size is uncertain but estimates suggest that the worldwide population likely exceeds tens of thousands of individuals. Regional surveys estimated 80,000 are in the Eastern Tropical Pacific, nearly 1,900 are off the west coast of the United States (excluding Alaska), and more than 15,000 are off Hawaii. The population in the Gulf of Mexico is extremely small and appeals have been made to have them made a protected species in this area. As of 2019 this was rejected on the basis that there was insufficient scientific evidence to consider them a Distinct Population Segment (DPS) under the Endangered Species Act (ESA).

== Behaviour ==
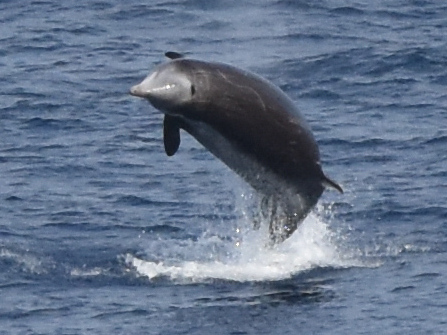
A whale breaching in Bay of Biscay

=== Diving ===
Cuvier's beaked whales are among the deepest diving marine mammals and spend much of their time underwater searching for prey. Satellite-linked tags and time-depth recorders have been used to track and study whale movement, showing that the species follows a relatively consistent dive pattern consisting of deep foraging dives followed by several shorter dives near the surface.

==== Typical dives ====
Typical foraging dives exceed depths of 800 m (2,600 ft) and generally last between 30 and 90 minutes. After completing a deep dive, whales usually perform a series of several shorter, shallower dives before undertaking another deep dive.

Surface intervals between dives are usually brief, often only lasting a few minutes. This limited time at the surface may reduce risk of predation from its predators such as orcas and large sharks.

==== Record dives ====
Cuvier's beaked whales hold the records for both the deepest and the longest dives ever documented for any mammal. In 2014, researchers recorded a dive of 2,992 m (9,816 ft) off the coast of California.

A later study in 2020 reported Cuvier's beaked whale making a dive that lasted 222 minutes (3.7 hours), the longest dive ever documented for any mammal.

These extraordinary dives are thought to be supported by specialised physiological adaptations common to deep-diving whales, including the ability to conserve oxygen, slow heart rate, and tolerate high pressure at depth, to avoid decompression sickness (a condition where gas bubbles form in the body due to rapid decrease in pressure on return to the surface).

=== Food and foraging ===
Cuvier's beaked whales primarily feed on deep-sea animals and are specialist hunters of squid. Their diet consists mainly of squid, along with deep-sea fish and some crustaceans. They usually make their dives in small social groups. This behaviour may reduce predation risk.

They are thought to forage during deep dives where they use suction feeding to capture prey. This involves opening the mouth, expanding the throat, and using the tongue to create a pressure difference that pulls prey into the mouth. This species possess throat pleats, that allows their throat to expand, which likely helps with suction feeding.

Echolocation is used to detect prey in deep, dark waters where sunlight does not reach. The "melon" (the bump on top of its head) contains its organ for echolocation. This allows them to hunt effectively at great depths and may reduce competition with other marine predators for their prey.

Most information about their diet comes from the analysis of stomach contents of stranded individuals. Examining Pacific Ocean whales, they found that cephalopods made up 98.0% (by number) and 87.7% (by mass) of Cuvier's beaked whale diet. Among these were at least 37 varieties of squid, of many different sizes. Diet can vary by region, depending on the availability of prey at different ocean depths.

=== Recorded prey ===
Recorded prey taxa from stomach content analyses include cockeyed squid (Histioteuthis atlantica, H. meleagroteuthis, H. bonnellii, H. reversa), smooth hooked squid (Filippovia knipovitchi), Atlantic cranch squid (Teuthowenia megalops), rugose hooked squid (Onykia robsoni), Sharpear enope squid (Ancistrocheirus lesueurii), Galiteuthis glacialis and G.armata, Octopoteuthis sicula, Dana octopus squid (Taningia danae), Discoteuthis sp., European flying squid (Todarodes sagittatus), Chiroteuthis veranii, Pholidoteuthis massyae, Vampire squid (Vampyroteuthis infernalis), Taonius pavo, Mastigoteuthis schmidti, Megalocranchia sp., and Longfin inshore squid (Doryteuthis pealeii). Crustaceans include shrimps and Stauroteuthis syrtensis

== Interactions with humans ==
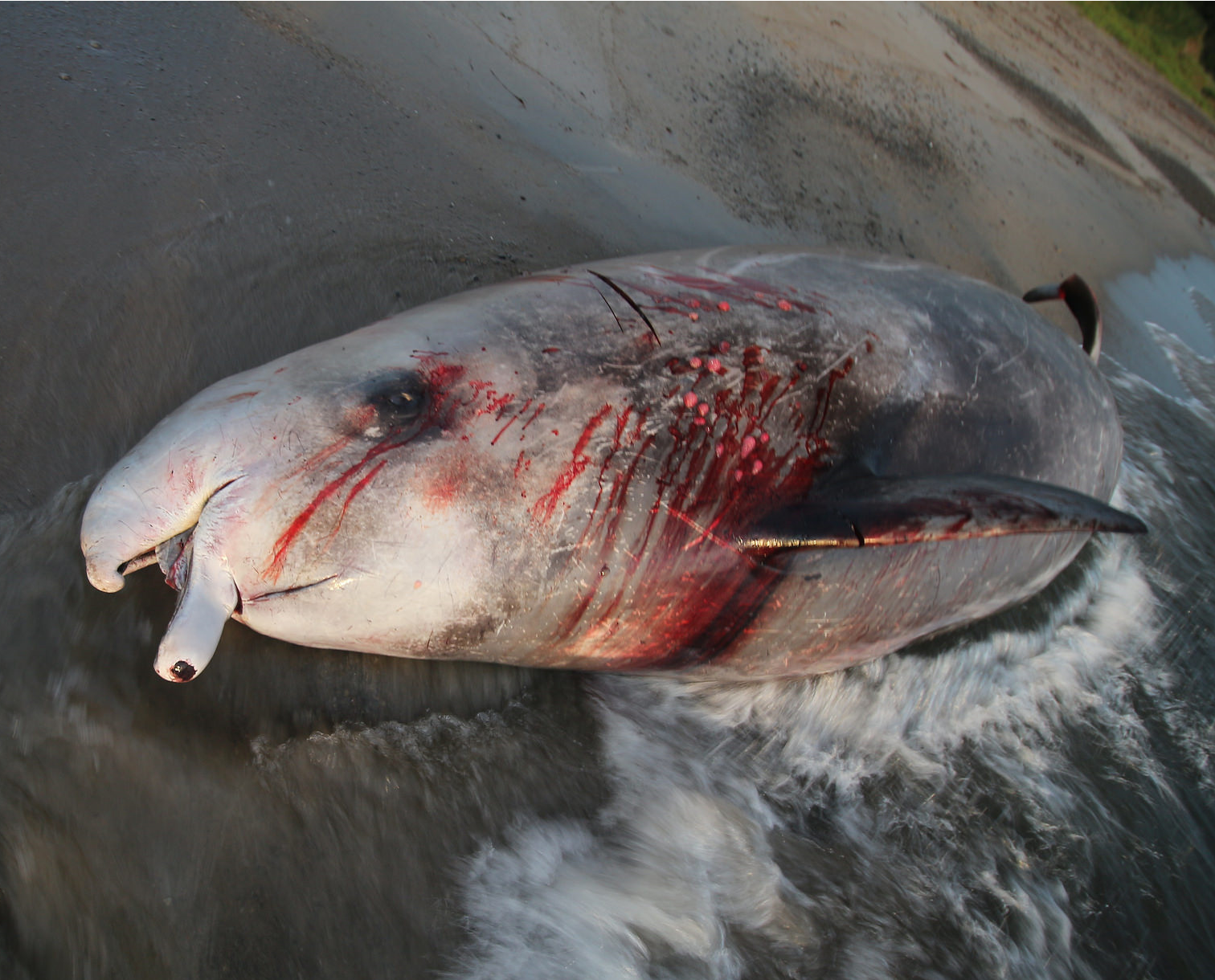
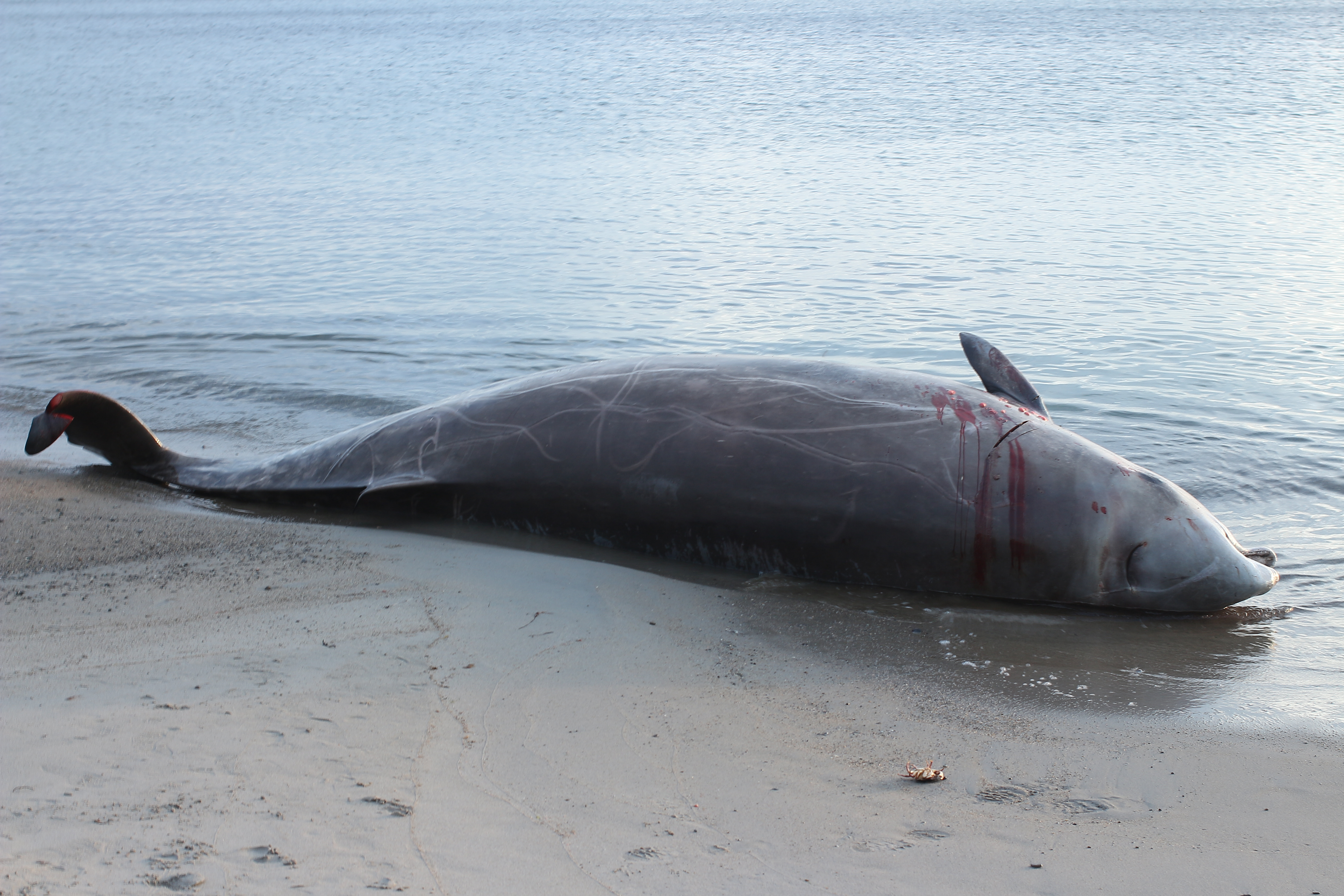
A whale beached in Newfoundland

=== Whaling and fishing ===
Cuvier's beaked whales have been hunted in small numbers, mainly in Japan. Before 1955, it is estimated that Japanese whalers caught anywhere from 3 to 35 Cuvier's every year. From 1955 until the 1990s, more than 4,000 Cuvier's beaked whales were reportedly caught.

In addition to intentional hunting, Cuvier's beaked whales are sometimes accidentally caught in fishing gear as bycatch, the unintended capture of animals in fishing equipment. Bycatch has been reported in regions worldwide, including the Eastern Pacific, North Atlantic, Mediterranean Sea, and parts of the Western Pacific and Southeast Asia. Most documented bycatch of Cuvier's beaked whales comes from the late 20th century, however, occasional incidents continue to be reported today.

=== Sonar and military manoeuvres ===
Cuvier's beaked whale are particularly sensitive to loud underwater noise, especially naval sonar. Sonar is a system that uses sound waves to detect objects underwater, often used by military vessels. Strandings and beachings often occur near naval bases where sonar may have been in use. Cuvier's have been observed in Hawaii avoiding diving for food or avoiding an area where sonar is in use. A higher incidence of strandings has been recorded in noisy seas such as the Mediterranean and multiple mass strandings have occurred following operations by the Spanish Navy in the Canary Islands.

In 2019, a review of mass stranding events concluded that mid-frequency active sonar can strongly affect Cuvier's beaked whales, although responses vary between individuals, sometimes depending on their prior exposure to sonar. The study found that stranded whales often showed signs of decompression sickness and gas embolism (gas bubbles block blood vessels), likely caused by abnormal diving behaviour in response to sonar. No more mass strandings were recorded in the Canary Islands once naval exercises using sonar were banned there. It was suggested the ban be extended to other areas such as the Mediterranean, where mass strandings continue to occur.

== Taxonomy ==
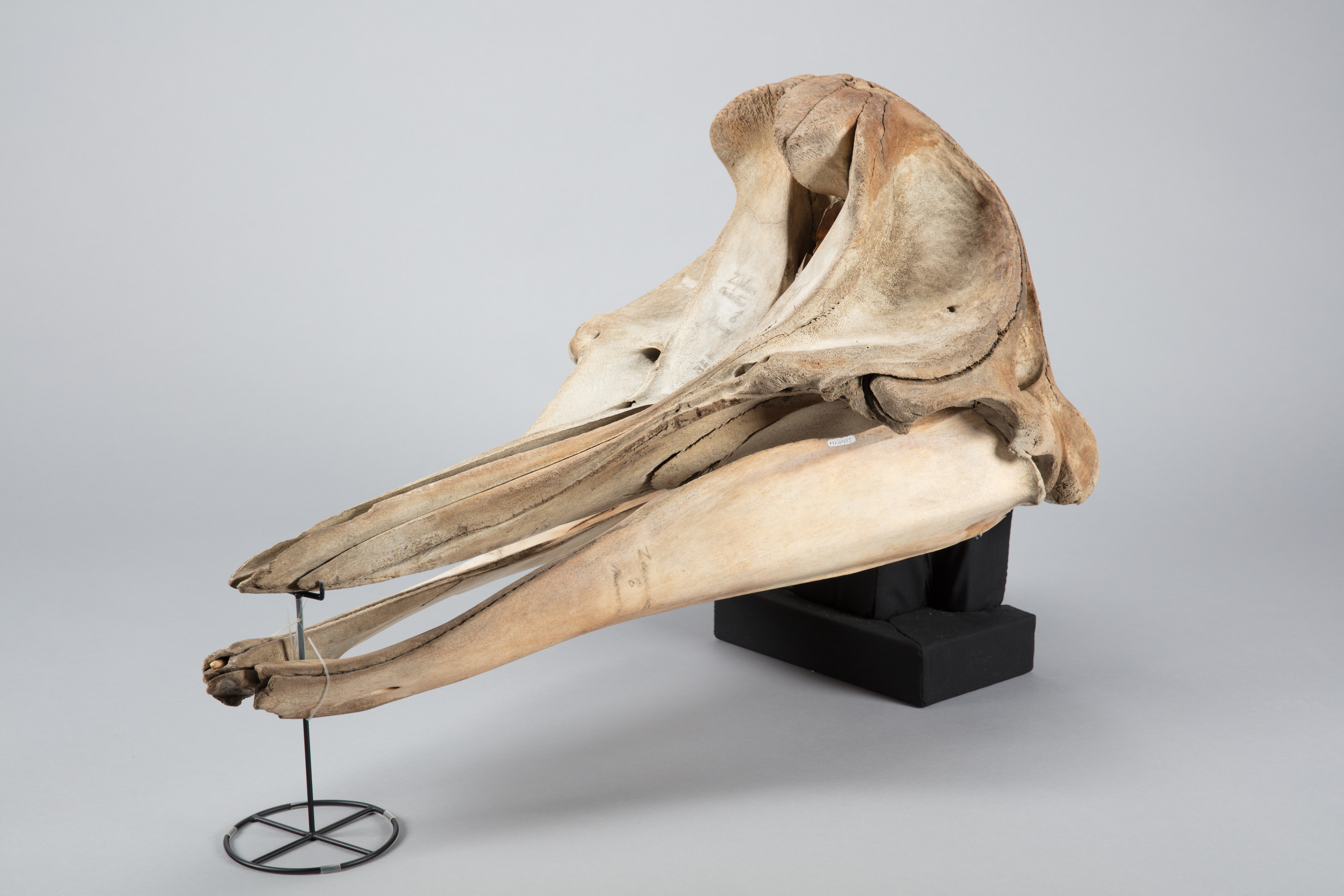
Skull of Cuvier's beaked whale

Cuvier's beaked whale was first described in 1823 by French naturalist and zoologist Georges Cuvier; he based his description on a skull found along the Mediterranean coast of France. He named the species Ziphius cavirostris from the Latin cavus meaning "hollow beak", referring to a deep hollow in the skull, known as the prenarial basin.

At the time, Cuvier believed the skull belonged to an extinct species. However, in 1850, paleontologist and zoologist, Paul Gervais, found the skull to be identical to that of a stranded (beached) whale carcass he had just examined.

Cuvier's beaked whale is one of over 20 living species in the family Ziphiidae. Males of this species have a distinctive feature: a dense, hardened area in the front part of the skull (rostrum), which is not as developed in other beaked whales.

== Conservation status ==
Cuvier's beaked whale is classified as Least Concern by the International Union for Conservation of Nature (IUCN), meaning it is not at high risk for extinction.

Despite its classification as Least Concern, Cuvier's beaked whale is affected by several human activities. These include entanglement in fishing gear and exposure to anthropogenic noise, which can disrupt normal behaviour and have been linked to mass stranding.

=== Protection and conservation efforts ===
Internationally, the species is protected under agreements such as Appendix II of the Convention on International Trade in Endangered Species of Wild Fauna and Flora (CITES), covering extant species that could become extinct without such trade controls.

Conservation efforts mainly focus on reducing human impacts to protect biodiversity and ecosystems. Continued research and monitoring are important for better understanding the populations of species and potential risks that could threaten them further.

In the United States, Cuvier's beaked whale is protected under the Marine Mammal Protection Act (MMPA), which prohibits the hunting, harassment, capturing, killing of all marine mammals; this is in place in U.S waters by U.S citizens.

The species is also covered in Annex II of the Protocol for Specially Protected Areas and Wildlife (SPAW). This is a regional agreement, that participating countries in the Greater Caribbean work together to manage and conserve listed species.

== See also ==
- List of cetaceans
