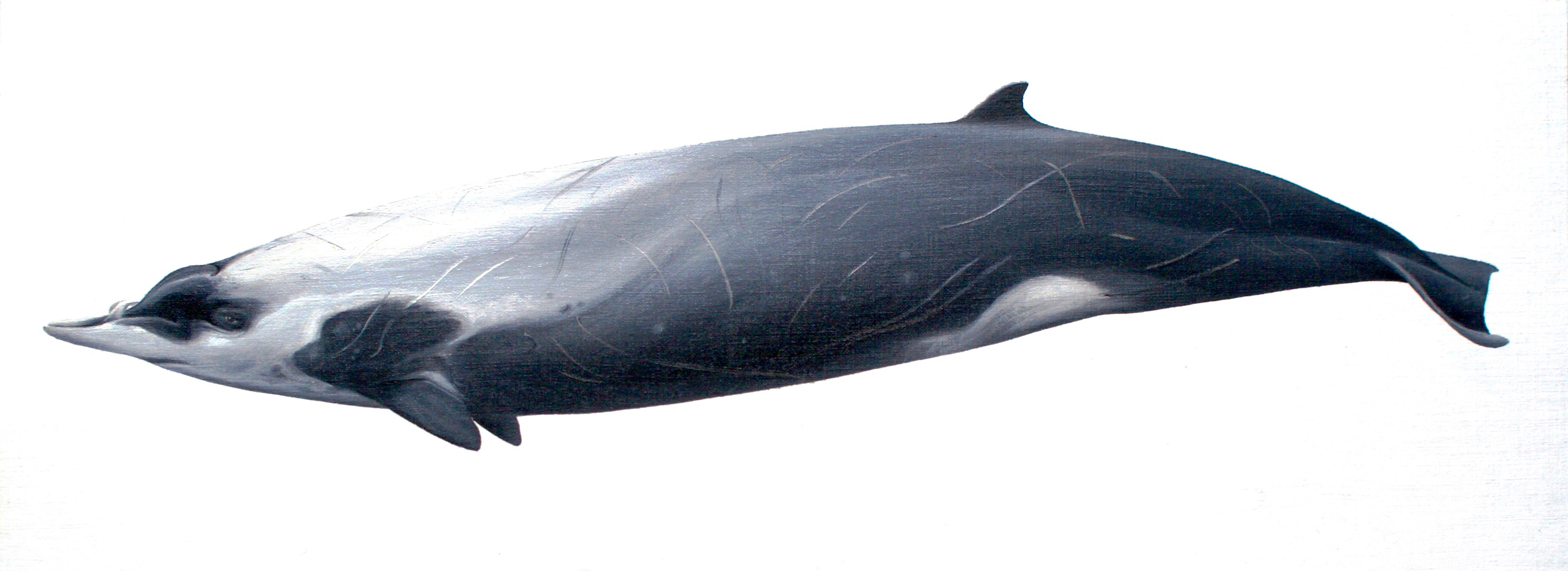

- Size compared to an average human

Conservation status
- Least Concern (IUCN 3.1)
- CITES Appendix II

Scientific classification
- Kingdom: Animalia
- Phylum: Chordata
- Class: Mammalia
- Order: Artiodactyla
- Infraorder: Cetacea
- Family: Ziphiidae
- Genus: Mesoplodon
- Species: M. layardii

Binomial name
- Mesoplodon layardii (Gray, 1865)
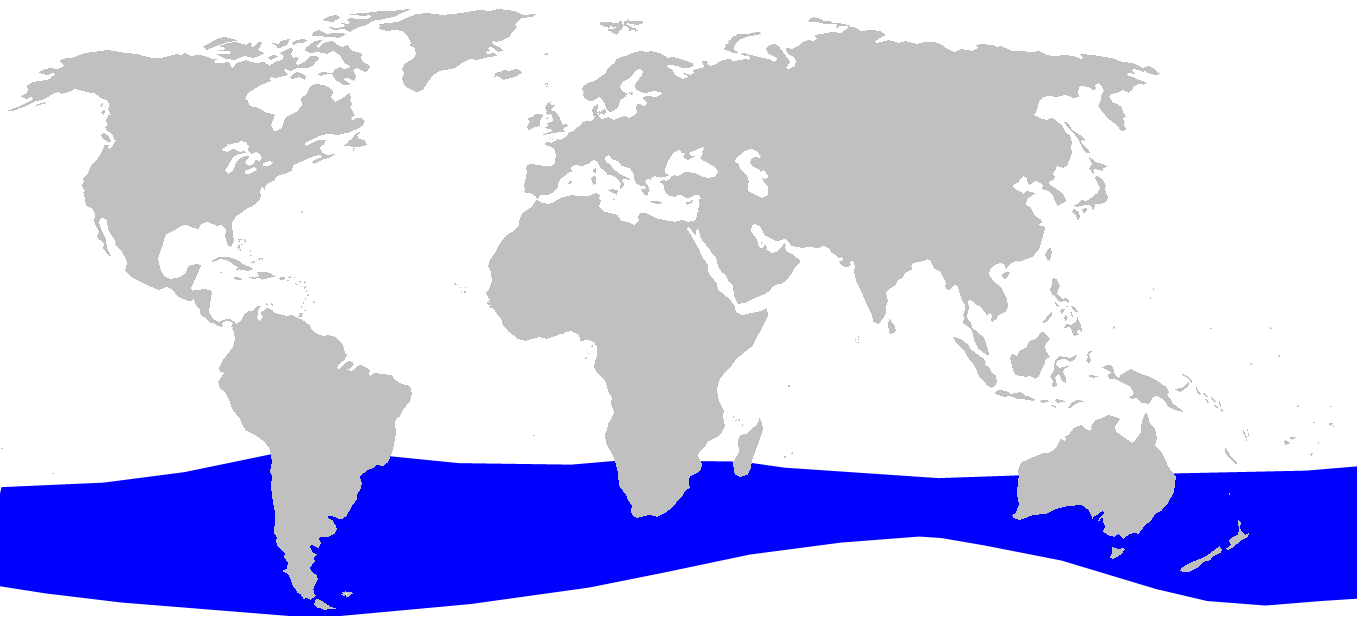
- Strap-toothed whale range

= Strap-toothed whale =

Strap-toothed beaked whale Temporal range: Late Pleistocene-Recent 0.01–0 Ma

Species of whale

The strap-toothed whale (Mesoplodon layardii), also known as Layard's beaked whale, is one of the largest members of the Mesoplodon genus, growing to 6.2 m (20 ft) in length and reaching up to 1,300 kg (2,900 lb). It is named for its long, curved teeth, which in adult males grow out of the lower jaw and arch over the upper jaw, restricting the jaw from opening. The common and scientific names also honor Edgar Leopold Layard, the curator of the South African Museum, who prepared drawings of a skull and sent them to the British taxonomist John Edward Gray, who described the species in 1865.

This species is known for its unique coloration pattern, and inhabits deep subantarctic waters of the southern hemisphere. Strap-toothed whales rely on echolocation clicks, surface at step angles, and tend to travel in small groups. Their diet consists mainly of squid, and males and females hunt the same sized prey. Although not a target for whaling, threats like plastic ingestion, noise pollution, and climate change can be threatening to the species.

== Description ==
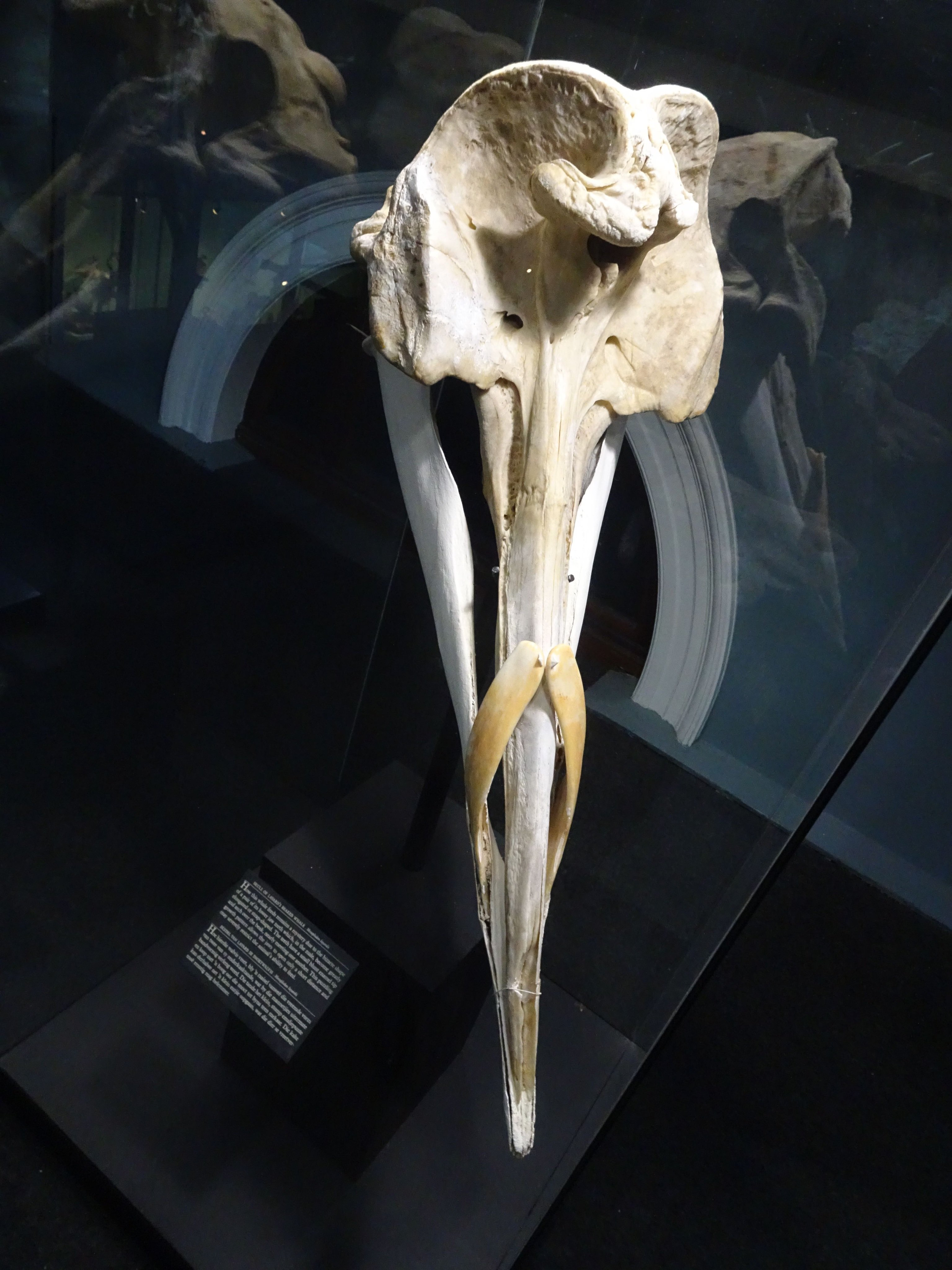
Skull of an adult male strap-toothed whale, showing the teeth and dramatically asymmetric maxillary crest.

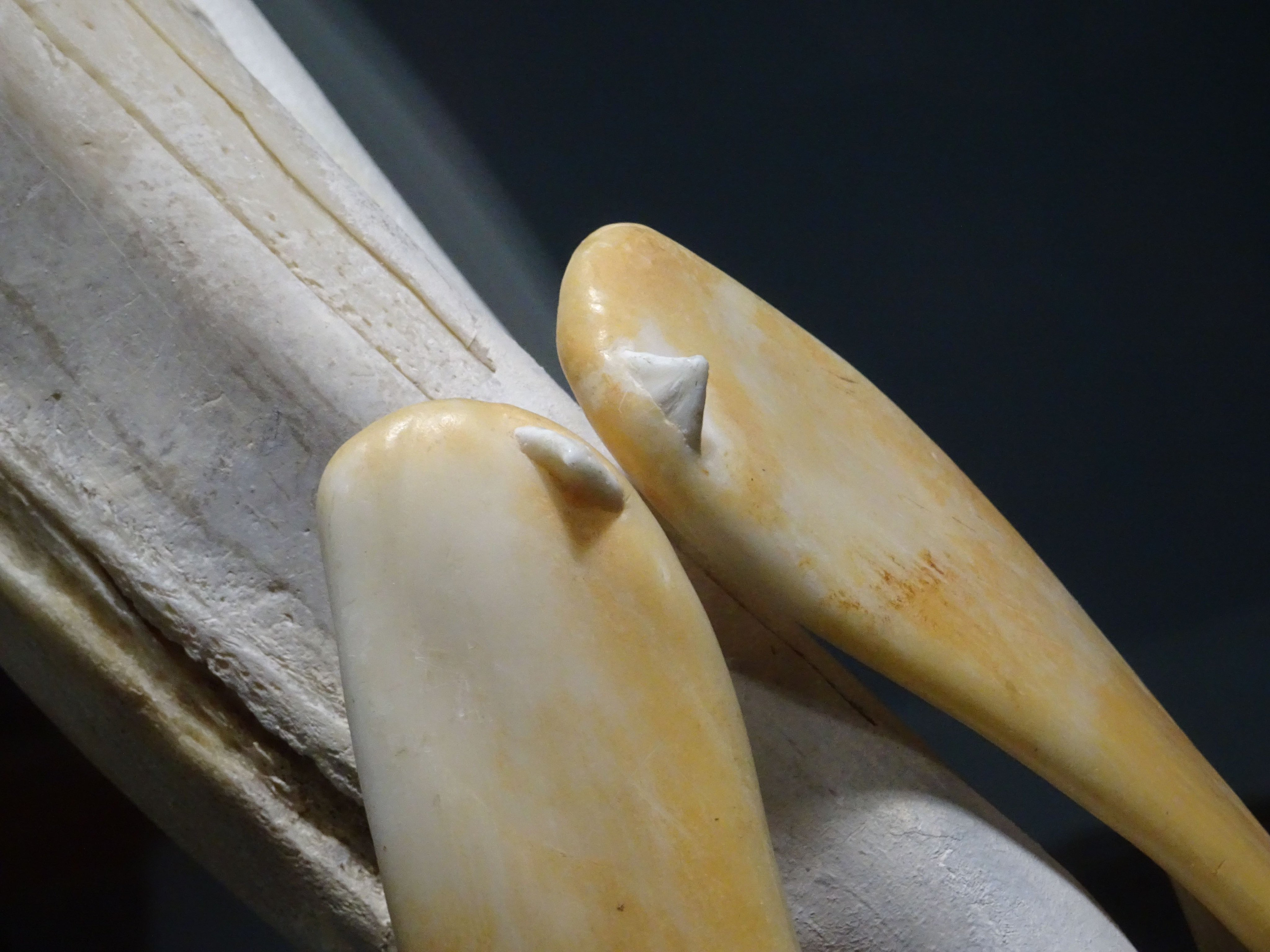
Tusks of an adult male enclosing the jaw, with sharp denticles visible on the upper surface

Adult strap-toothed whales show a distinctive colouration that perhaps makes them one of the most readily-distinguishable beaked whale species. Adults have a white beak, with a dark face mask pattern and a pale white 'cape' that extends to halfway between the dorsal fin and head. The dorsal fin is set far back down the body and is white-tipped. The flukes also have white tips. When observed closely, either at sea or when stranded, these whales show a pale neckband that separates the darker grey colouration found upon the head and melon from the rest of the body. While adult whales show striking colouration, juvenile animals are harder to distinguish from other beaked whale species, having a uniform grey colouration. Researchers have compiled a database of mitochondrial DNA sequences for all 21 recognized species of beaked whales. This allows for easier identification of whale species that may closely resemble each other. Males can reach around 5.9 metres (19 ft), whereas females reach 6.2 metres (20 ft) and likely weigh around 1,000–1,300 kilograms (2,200–2,900 lb). Newborn calves may be up to 2.8 metres (9.2 ft) in length.

This beaked whale shows a marked sexual dimorphism in that only the males retain functional teeth. Male strap-toothed whales develop a large flat tusk from each lower jaw as juveniles, which grows at a 45° angle back towards the head and over the rostrum (beak). In adults these teeth reach up to 34 cm (13 in) in length, restricting the jaw from opening. Two stranded adult male strap-toothed whales were recorded as only being able to open their mouths 3.2 and 4 cm (1.3 and 1.6 in) wide, compared to females and juveniles that had a gape size of 6.5 cm (2.6 in). It is thought that males use their teeth to compete for mating access to females, as evidenced by scars and scratches on the bodies of males. A small denticle found upon the upper surface of the tooth may be utilised for such combat.

== Geographical range/ distribution ==
Based on sporadic sightings and a number of stranded animals, it appears that the strap-toothed whale ranges widely across the Southern Ocean, with a possible circumpolar distribution in sub-Antarctic and temperate waters. Records for the species have been made in Tierra del Fuego and Chubut in Argentina, the Falkland Islands, Western and Southern Australia and New Zealand. Late Pleistocene fossil remains attributed to this species have been reported from the Southern Ocean.

The northernmost extent of the range is continually changing; strandings were noted at 31–32° south of the equator along Brazil's southern coast until an emaciated carcass was found at 13° S on Maré Island off the north-east coast of Brazil in 2002. However, in 2011 an adult male strap-toothed whale stranded alive in Myanmar at 16° north of the equator; more than 5000 km further north than the previously accepted range of the species. The whale died and a necropsy revealed that there was no prey within the stomach, but the overall body condition was good.

It is possible that this species migrates due to the seasonality of observed strandings. Research and sightings suggest that strap-toothed whales may approach coastal waters in the summer months to give birth. Coastal waters are inshore and shallower than preferred deep offshore habitats, which can allude to the few number of sightings.

== Behavior ==
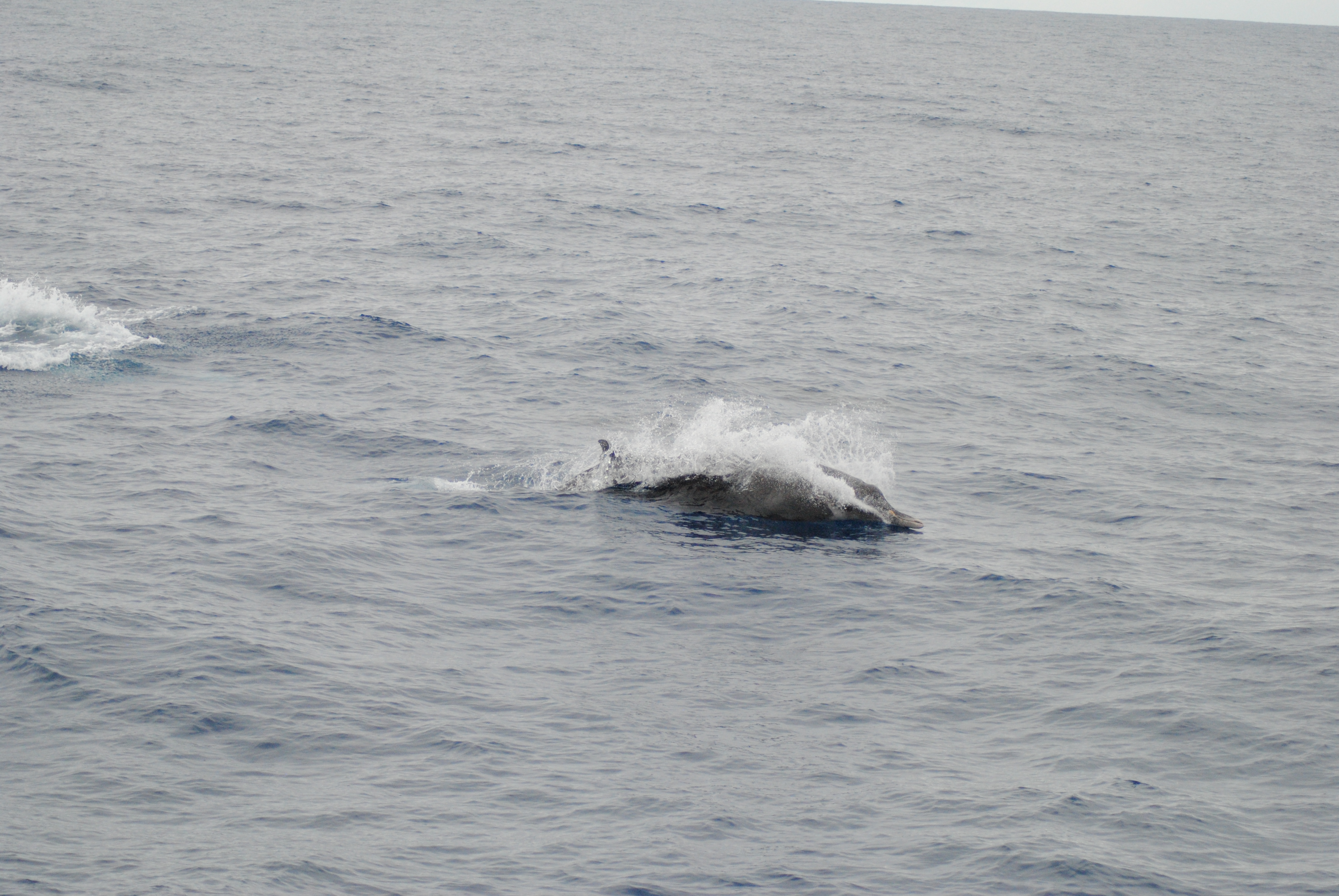
A porpoising strap-toothed whale, photographed in the Drake Passage between Chile and Antarctica.

Little is known about the behavior of this species. Beaked whales are thought to travel in small groups, and observed group sizes for the strap-toothed whale range from two to ten individuals. Social structure of mesoplodonts in general is largely understudied, due to the difficulty of observing individuals at sea. It is possible that group sizes and composition are controlled by the type of rostrum and teeth found amongst the various species. Larger and heavily armed species that can inflict wounds generally travel in groups where only one or two males are present, reducing the risk of aggressive interactions. Despite having large tusks, male strap-toothed whales likely only use a small protruding denticle on each tooth in agonistic interactions. Subsequently, this species may travel in groups with multiple males as the risk of serious injury is lessened and females are observed to be paired with calves.

The species is reported to bask at the water's surface on calm days, but is noted to be difficult to approach in vessels as the species has been reported to sink out of sight upon approach. Strap-toothed whales typically do not show their flukes upon diving and like other several other beaked whales, they surface at a steep angle emerging beak first. A number of observations suggest that diving is typified by a slow descent beneath the surface, with dive duration lasting between 10 and 15 minutes. The species can travel at speed, and may show 'porpoising' behavior. Although not known for their acrobatics, breeching has been seen among some individuals. Strap-toothed whales are capable of plunging nearly 2 miles under the surface but most dives reach closer to half miles depths where they can continue for hours at a time.

Because the strap-toothed whale, like other beaked species lives in such deep and dark ocean depths they rely on echolocation to orient themselves and hunt in such extreme conditions. In the same way a human uses the larynx to create different vocal registers, like a speaking voice, falsetto, or low vice, beaked whales can use specialized vocal registers for specific sounds. Strap-toothed whales use adaptive nasal passages to produce powerful clicks, low frequency grunts, and high pitched whistles. The mechanisms for these unique sound are still being investigated but it is known that echolocation clicks and whistles can exceed depths of 1,000 meters. Echolocation is one key factor that allows survival in extreme deep ocean waters.

=== Predators ===
The orca (Orcinus orca) is a documented predator of this species. One was recorded chasing, attacking and killing a solitary adult strap-toothed whale about 50 km (31 mi) offshore of Bremer Bay in south-western Australia.

=== Food and foraging ===
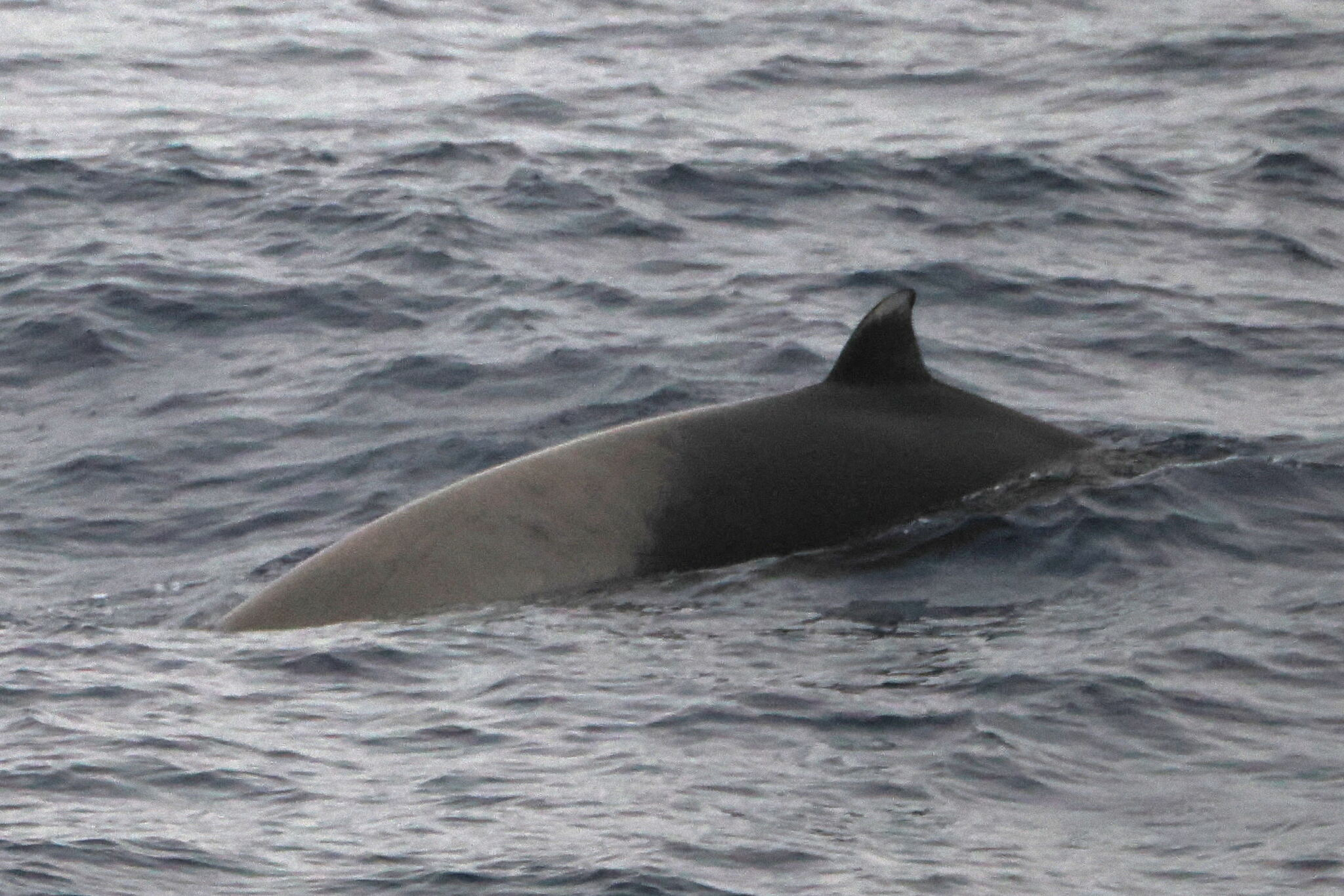
An adult observed in the Drake Passage.

The main prey of the strap-tooth whale is thought to be oceanic cephalopods. One of these species being Vampyroteuthis infernalis, the vampire squid, which is known to live 600 to 900 m (2,000 to 3,000 ft) below sea level. In an extensive dietary analysis of 14 stranded whales from New Zealand and South Africa, 94.8% of the stomach contents were composed of cephalopods, with evidence of some fish and crustaceans. A difference in the shape of consumed prey was noted between male and female whales, but it was determined that both sexes targeted squid of a similar size. While adult males have a restricted gape size due to the position of their overlapping tusks, it is possible that this allows them to create more suction when feeding, allowing them to forage effectively on the same prey as females and juveniles.

Recorded prey taxa include Histioteuthis meleagroteuthis and H. macrohista, Chiroteuthis sp., Taonius pavo, Gonatus antarcticus, Teuthowenia pellucida, and Mastigoteuthis sp.

== Population status ==
The size of the population is unknown, however it has been noted that the species is one of the more common beaked whale species found in the southern ocean.

== Threats ==
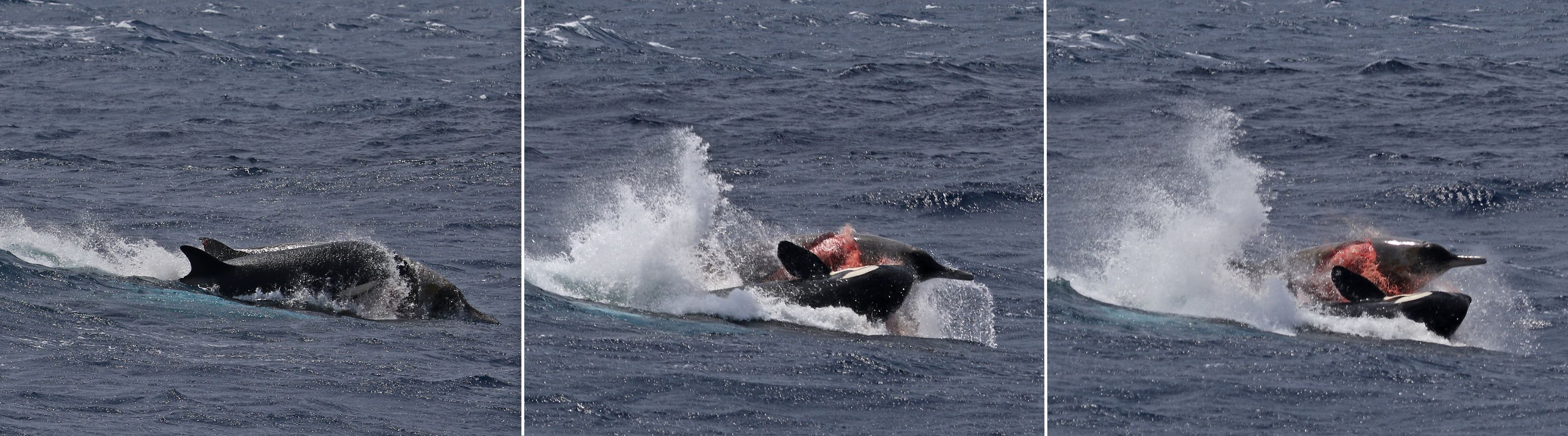
A strap-tooth beaked whale is seen porpoising through the water as a killer whale attacks its right flank, resulting in a large bite wound

Strap-toothed beaked whales have not been commercially hunted; however, they are at risk from entanglement and disturbance from anthropogenic noise. Intense noise, particularly that from sonar, has been shown to cause panic, rapid ascent and subsequent death due to decompression sickness in a number of beaked whale species.

As the species has a largely circumpolar distribution, it is likely to be at risk from the impacts of anthropogenic climate change. Although the cause is unknown beaked whales being washed ashore or stuck in shallow waters are found to have developed gas pockets in the body causing tissue injury. Strandings have been reported in New Zealand on the sum Antarctic islands, Australia, and South Africa, most frequently in months of December to March. Strapped tooth whales are not victims of commercial or cetacean whaling, however internalizing microplastics and larger plastic debris is the largest human made threat to beaked whales. The International Union for the Conservation of Nature (IUCN) lists habitat alteration and habitat shift as possible threats related to climate change.

== See also ==
- List of cetaceans
