= Stigmatoteuthis arcturi =

Conservation status
- Least Concern (IUCN 3.1)

Scientific classification
- Kingdom: Animalia
- Phylum: Mollusca
- Class: Cephalopoda
- Order: Oegopsida
- Family: Histioteuthidae
- Genus: Stigmatoteuthis
- Species: S. arcturi

Binomial name
- Stigmatoteuthis arcturi Robson, 1948

Synonyms
- Histioteuthis arcturi (Robson, 1948)

Species of cephalopod known as the jewelled squid

Stigmatoteuthis arcturi, commonly known as the jewelled squid, is a species of cock-eyed squid from the family Histioteuthidae. It occurs throughout the subtropical and tropical Atlantic Ocean in the mesopelagic zone.

== Description ==
Like the other members of its genus, Stigmatoteuthis arcturi has very long arms in comparison with its mantle length. Other features of the genus include pairing of the reproductive organs in the male, the central line of light organs on the head having three photophores, and the basal line eight photophores and three sawteeth. The photophores on the front half of the underside of the mantle are compound and evenly spaced, but there are no compound photophores on the tips of the fourth pair of arms. The central row of suckers on the tentacular clubs are enlarged and at least four times the diameter of the tiny suckers in the outer rows. The skin of larger individuals develops dermal warts underneath the epidermis. Females grow to a mantle length of about 200 mm (8 in) and males to about 125 mm (5 in).

== Distribution and habitat ==
This mesopelagic squid is found in deep water in the tropical and subtropical Atlantic Ocean, between about 40°N and 30°S, particularly in the Sargasso Sea and Gulf of Mexico. Juveniles with a mantle length less than 5 mm (0.2 in) occur at depths between 200 and 400 m (700 and 1,300 ft). Larger juveniles occur rather deeper and may ascend to 400 m (1,300 ft) at night, spending the day between 450 and 750 m (1,500 and 2,500 ft) while adults occur at depths between 600 and 2,700 m (2,000 and 9,000 ft).

== Ecology ==
Like other members of the family Histioteuthidae, S. arcturi has eyes that are different in size and oriented in different directions; the left eye is large, semi-tubular and points upwards while the right eye is small and normal in shape, and points forward and downwards. The left eye is believed to detect animals higher in the water column, silhouetted against the sky, while the right eye detects animals in front of and below the squid.
