= Heteropsis =

Heteropsis may refer to:

- Heteropsis (butterfly), a genus of butterflies in the family Nymphalidae
- Heteropsis (plant), a genus of plants in the family Araceae
- Histioteuthis heteropsis, a small squid species with two very differently-sized and purposed eyes.
