= Histioteuthis celetaria =

Conservation status
- Data Deficient (IUCN 3.1)

Scientific classification
- Kingdom: Animalia
- Phylum: Mollusca
- Class: Cephalopoda
- Order: Oegopsida
- Family: Histioteuthidae
- Genus: Histioteuthis
- Species: H. celetaria

Binomial name
- Histioteuthis celetaria (Voss, 1960)

Synonyms
- Histioteuthis celetaria (Voss, 1960)

Species of squid

Histioteuthis celeteria, also known as the elegant jewel squid, is a species of cock-eyed squid. The species is distributed across the Atlantic Ocean, and can be found from aa depth of 0 meters to a depth of about 1,010 m (3,310 ft). The maximum length of the species is 8.7 cm (3.4 in).
