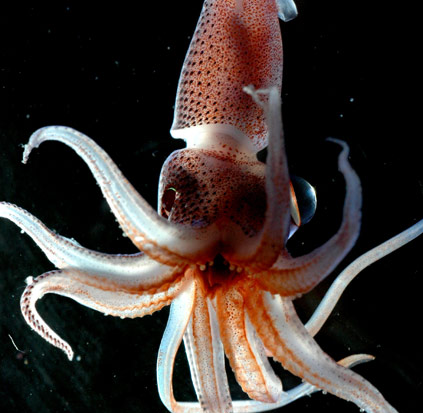
- Histioteuthis heteropsis, showing distinctive asymmetrical eyes

Conservation status
- Least Concern (IUCN 3.1)

Scientific classification
- Kingdom: Animalia
- Phylum: Mollusca
- Class: Cephalopoda
- Order: Oegopsida
- Family: Histioteuthidae
- Genus: Histioteuthis
- Species: H. heteropsis

Binomial name
- Histioteuthis heteropsis (Berry, 1913)

Synonyms
- Calliteuthis heteropsis (Berry, 1913)

= Histioteuthis heteropsis =

Strawberry Squid

Species of squid

Histioteuthis heteropsis, known as the strawberry squid, is a species of small cock-eyed squid. The scientific nomenclature of these squid stems from their set of differently sized eyes, one being small and blue and the other being large and yellow. It is thought that the large eye is used to see objects against dim light, while the smaller eye is more able to view bioluminescent light sources. The squid's vernacular name arose due to its rich red skin pigmentation and the presence of photophores along its body, making it appear like a strawberry with seeds.

H. heteropsis live in the ocean's mesopelagic zone and are found in the California Current and the Humboldt Current. Little is known about their specific feeding and mating behaviors, although their inking patterns have been subject to study. They are not easily disturbed and only ink when provoked.

H. heteropsis was discovered by Berry in 1913 and exhibited publicly for the first time at the Monterey Bay Aquarium on June 27, 2014.

== Description ==
Histioteuthis heteropsis is a small squid, with mature males averaging 54–89 mm (2.1–3.5 in) in mantle length, and has a purplish-red skin pigment. It is typically around 200 mm (8 in) in total length.

=== Eyes ===
The eyes of Histioteuthis heteropsis are dimorphic both in size and in lens pigmentation for specialized vision in the ocean's mesopelagic zone (200–1000 meters below the ocean surface). The different properties of the squid's eyes allow it to see a variety of different light sources present in its habitat, primarily downwelling sunlight and bioluminescence. H. heteropsis hatchlings are born with identical eyes of the same size and pigmentation. As they develop, the left eye becomes larger and more pigmented. By adulthood, the left eye can grow to be over twice the size of the right eye and has a distinct yellow lens pigmentation. In a 2017 study conducted by Kate Thomas, Bruce Robinson, and Sönke Johnsen, it was found that the large left yellow eye is oriented upwards for viewing objects in dim sunlight and the smaller right blue eye is oriented downwards for viewing bioluminescence. While the larger eye can detect bioluminescence fairly well, the smaller eye struggles to view black objects in dim light.

=== Photophores ===
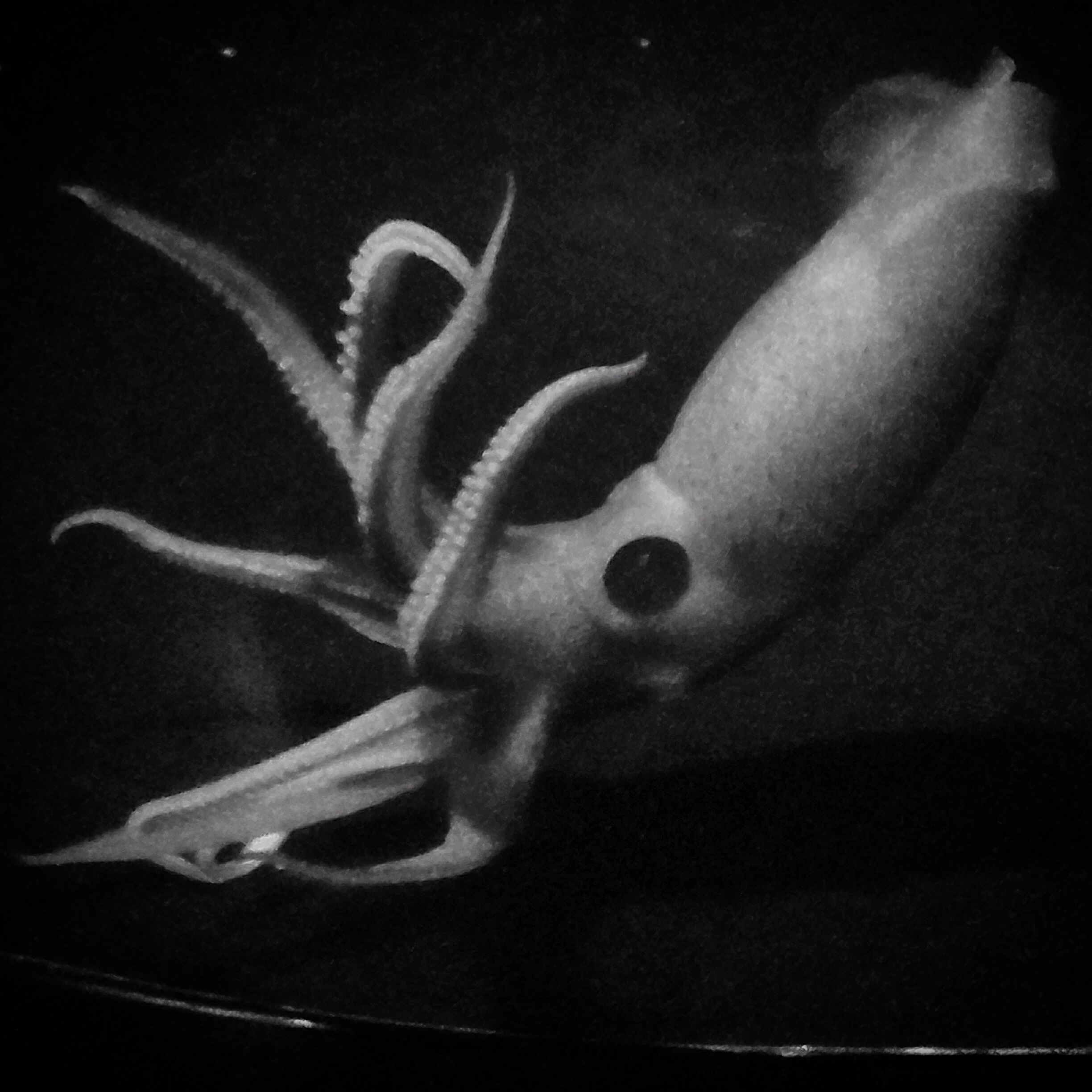
H.heteropsis at the Monterey Bay Aquarium, June 2014.

Small photophores, which are glandular, light-producing organs, are found in high concentrations along the entire body of H. heteropsis. The photophores are more dense near the anterior head region of the squid and become smaller and farther apart near the posterior end. Apart from H. meleagroteuthis, H. heteropsis is the only member in the family Histioteuthidae to display such small and highly concentrated photophores. H. heteropsis mainly uses its photophores for two purposes: counter-illumination and concealing prey. In counter-illumination, the squid produces blue light from its photophores so that, when viewed from above, it blends in with the downwelling sunlight and effectively erases its silhouette. This type of bioluminescence is characterized by consistent light production, in contrast to bioluminescence used for concealing prey, which is characterized by short bursts of intense light or "flashes". Although the exact purpose for this particular use of bioluminescence is unknown, the heavily pigmented oral cavity and interbrachial membrane of H. heteropsis and some other squids suggests that luminescence by the prey threatens the predator in some way.

=== Reproductive organs ===
Histioteuthis heteropsis males do not possess a hectocotylus as is common in other mesopelagic squid species, although they do have a penis which is used to transfer spermatophores to the female during copulation. During maturation, the penis grows until it can extend out of the mantle cavity. The spermatophores of H. heteropsis have short sperm masses and are stored in a looped Needham's sac. Female H. heteropsis squids have a singular ovary where the oocytes are developed. Although not much is known about female reproductive systems in H. heteropsis specifically, other members of the family Histioteuthidae show significant oocyte resorption (oosorption) during maturation.

== Habitat ==
H. heteropsis is generally found at ocean depths of 200–1000 meters (0.12–0.62 miles), which is considered part of the ocean's mesopelagic, or twilight, zone. The species undergoes diurnal vertical migration, where they are found at lower depths during the day and migrate up the water column at night. In a study about vertical distributions of pelagic cephalopods conducted by Clyde Roper and Richard Young, it was found that, during the day, most H. heteropsis specimens were found at 500–700 meters while at night, most were found at 300–400 meters.

H. heteropsis live in the Pacific Ocean and are predominantly found in the California Current and the Humboldt Current. Population distribution of H. heteropsis is better known in the California Current than it is in the Humboldt Current and the species does not inhabit waters close to the equator. There is no evidence to suggest horizontal migration in histioteuthid squids, including H. heteropsis.

Within marine food webs, H. heteropsis plays an important role in the diets of tuna, porpoises, blue sharks, sperm whales, elephant seals, and albatross. Not much is known about the diet of H. heteropsis itself, although limited stomach content evaluations show that they feed on fish, crustaceans, and smaller squids.

== Behavior ==
=== Feeding ===
H. heteropsis searches for prey using visual clues and strikes forward at the prey using their tentacles. The tentacles then bring the prey within range of the arms, which hold the prey in place with suckers. H. heteropsis, like most squids, bite immediately into the fleshy parts of the prey with their beak and release the leftover corpse.

=== Mating ===
Very little is known about mating and courtship in H. heteropsis, although it is likely that these behaviors occur in deeper waters. Spawning may occur in deep-midwater or near-surface waters, but it is still unclear.

=== Inking ===
Inking developed as an important protective mechanism for coleoid cephalopods after losing their ancestral external shell. However, inking is metabolically costly since it requires the discharge of both melanin and mucus. Because of this, H. heteropsis typically only inks when approached closely or touched. Researchers Stephanie Bush and Bruce Robinson observed that H. heteropsis most often produces an ink cloud categorized as "pseudomorphs", which are "dense blobs of ink the approximate shape and size of the individual releasing them." In all instances of inking, H. heteropsis specimens lingered in the ink cloud unless further provoked.

== Taxonomy ==
In 1913, Berry discovered H. heteropsis and recognized it as a member of the family Histioteuthidae due to its large number of photophores. Based on significant morphological traits, it appears that H. heteropsis is most closely related to H. meleagroteuthis and H. bonnellii.

== Conservation status ==
Based on a 2010 assessment by the International Union for Conservation of Nature (IUCN), H. heteropsis is categorized as least concern due to its large geographic distribution. There are no known threats to the species and population information is not available. The IUCN recommends that more research be done into H. heteropsis to determine details about its population and ecological role.
