= Histioteuthis corona =

Conservation status
- Least Concern (IUCN 3.1)

Scientific classification
- Kingdom: Animalia
- Phylum: Mollusca
- Class: Cephalopoda
- Order: Oegopsida
- Family: Histioteuthidae
- Genus: Histioteuthis
- Species: H. corona

Binomial name
- Histioteuthis corona (Voss & Voss, 1962)

Synonyms
- Calliteuthis corona Voss & Voss, 1962

Species of squid

Histioteuthis corona is a species of cock-eyed squid. The species has been observed sporadically in the Pacific and Atlantic oceans, and is also largely concentrated off the coast of Florida in the Gulf of Mexico.
