= Histioteuthis miranda =

Conservation status
- Least Concern (IUCN 3.1)

Scientific classification
- Kingdom: Animalia
- Phylum: Mollusca
- Class: Cephalopoda
- Order: Oegopsida
- Family: Histioteuthidae
- Genus: Histioteuthis
- Species: H. miranda

Binomial name
- Histioteuthis miranda (Berry, 1918)

Synonyms
- Histioteuthis miranda (Berry, 1918)

Species of squid

Histioteuthis miranda is a species of cock-eyed squid. The species largely resides in the Indo-Pacific Ocean, and members are gonochoric.
