= Histioteuthis eltaninae =

Conservation status
- Least Concern (IUCN 3.1)

Scientific classification
- Kingdom: Animalia
- Phylum: Mollusca
- Class: Cephalopoda
- Order: Oegopsida
- Family: Histioteuthidae
- Genus: Histioteuthis
- Species: H. eltaninae

Binomial name
- Histioteuthis eltaninae Voss, 1969

Species of squid

Histioteuthis eltaninae is a species of deep-sea squid of the family Histioteuthidae, the cock eyed squids, so named due to their asymmetrical eyes. It inhabits the Southern Ocean, mostly in the subantarctic and Antarctic regions, within the mesopelagic and bathypelagic zones.

== Description ==
Histioteuthis eltaninae is a small to medium sized squid with a typical mantle length that ranges approximately 66 to 88 mm (2.6 to 3.5 in). As in other species of Histioteuthis, they possess asymmetrical eyes; One eye is significantly larger than the other, and in life the squid swims so that each eye is able to fulfill its specialized purpose: the large left eye faces upwards, while the smaller right eye faces downwards, thought to be for protection against predators.

H. eltaninae belongs to the reversa species group within Histioteuthis, which is distinguished by photophore arrangements and other morphological characters. The photophores or bioluminescent organs are present on multiple parts of the body including the mantle, arms, and around the eyes. Each species has a specific pattern of photophores that can also be used for identification: in Histioteuthis eltaninae, there are 3 rows of large photophores on the arms and 18 photophores around their eyes. The more mature the species is, the number or pattern of photophores may change.

Histioteuthis eltaninae has 5 to 6 rows of suckers on each tentacle. The arms vary in length and may have different proportions.

== Distribution and habitat ==
Histioteuthis eltaninae can be found in the Southern Ocean, mostly in subantarctic regions. They typically live in deeper pelagic environments, usually the mesopelagic and bathypelagic zones where there is little to no sunlight in the water column.

Their distribution across the Southern Ocean are believed to be influenced by ocean currents, temperature gradients, and oceanographic features. All of these factors affect how they disperse during early life stages, as well as food source opportunities. The species has been observed and documented off the coast of New Zealand.

Scientists have found that this species travels vertically through the water column between 100 m (330 ft) to below 1,000 m (3,300 ft), a process called the diel vertical migration. Juveniles have been caught in open fishing nets around 200 m (660 ft) during the day.

== Biology ==
Living deep in the sea with little to no accessible light, Histioteuthis eltaninae must have special adaptations to survive. One key feature is their eyes: the large one, facing upwards, helps detect the silhouette of prey items against the dim light from above. The smaller eye, facing downwards, helps detect any bioluminescent signals from below. Researchers found that 65% of adult Histioteuthidae had yellow pigmentation present in the bigger eye. They believe this could be an adaptation of breaking prey's camouflage by filtering out the blue and green colors from the ocean and countering the counterillumination their prey may be producing. It is predicted that this adaptation is developed with maturity.

Another adaptation that they have is their photophores, which produce light and have other functions such as counterillumination for camouflage, which helps them avoid detection from predators. Researchers also believe they use photophores for communication and species recognition.

Through gut content analysis and biochemical analysis such as serological methods, Histioteuthis eltaninae are known to feed mostly on small fish and crustaceans.

Like most Antarctic squid, they are mid-trophic level predators in marine food webs, being both predators as well as prey to larger animals. Predators of cockeye squid include sperm whales, sharks, seabirds such as penguins, and seals.

=== Reproduction and life cycle ===
The early life stages and reproduction research is very limited regarding Histioteuthis eltaninae. It is believed that the life cycle and reproduction is similar to other deep-sea squids. It is believed that this species starts its early life stages planktonic, which then get distributed by ocean currents and other environmental conditions that may take place. Researchers have seen patterns of morphological changes that take place as the animal matures. Photophore patterns change and arm structures get stronger and longer. This species is predicted to only live up to a year, as they are believed to be semelparous, reproducing once before dying. Males produce packets of sperm called spermatophores that are stored inside the body until it is ready to be transferred to the females during mating. This species has larger spermatophores than other species of Histioteuthis. Females can release tens of thousands of eggs at once. These are usually released in synchronous spawning.
