= Histioteuthis inermis =

Conservation status
- Data Deficient (IUCN 3.1)

Scientific classification
- Kingdom: Animalia
- Phylum: Mollusca
- Class: Cephalopoda
- Order: Oegopsida
- Family: Histioteuthidae
- Genus: Histioteuthis
- Species: H. inermis

Binomial name
- Histioteuthis inermis (Taki, 1964)

Synonyms
- Histioteuthis inermis (Taki, 1964)

Species of squid

Histioteuthis inermis is a species of cock-eyed squid. The species is heavily concentrated in the Mediterranean Sea but has been observed in numerous other parts of the world, including off the coasts of the eastern United States, South Africa, Australia and India.
