= Histioteuthis cerasina =

Conservation status
- Least Concern (IUCN 3.1)

Scientific classification
- Kingdom: Animalia
- Phylum: Mollusca
- Class: Cephalopoda
- Order: Oegopsida
- Family: Histioteuthidae
- Genus: Histioteuthis
- Species: H. cerasina

Binomial name
- Histioteuthis cerasina Nesis, 1971

Synonyms
- Histioteuthis celetaria cerasina Nesis, 1971

Species of squid

Histioteuthis cerasina is a species of cock-eyed squid. The species can be found residing in multiple places, including off the coast of Chile.
