= Histioteuthis pacifica =

Conservation status
- Data Deficient (IUCN 3.1)

Scientific classification
- Kingdom: Animalia
- Phylum: Mollusca
- Class: Cephalopoda
- Order: Oegopsida
- Family: Histioteuthidae
- Genus: Histioteuthis
- Species: H. pacifica

Binomial name
- Histioteuthis pacifica (Voss, 1962)

Species of squid

Histioteuthi pacifica is a species of cock-eyed squid. The species has been documented off the coasts of Bangladesh and Australia.
