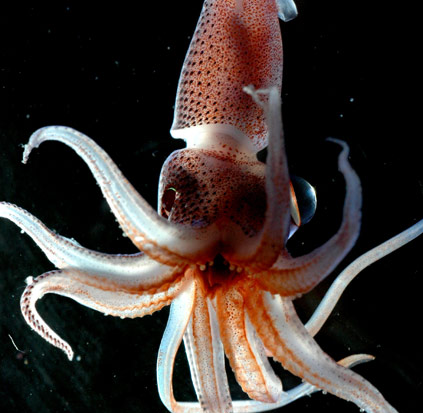
- Strawberry squid (Histioteuthis heteropsis)

Scientific classification
- Kingdom: Animalia
- Phylum: Mollusca
- Class: Cephalopoda
- Order: Oegopsida
- Family: Histioteuthidae; Verrill, 1881

Type genus
- Histioteuthis d'Orbigny, 1841

= Histioteuthidae =

Family of cephalopods

Histioteuthidae is a family of Oegopsid squid. The family was previously considered to be monotypic but the World Register of Marine Species assigns two genera to this family.

The species classified under Histioteuthidae are mostly weakly muscled, moderately sized squid with a maximum mantle length of 33 cm (13 in). They generally have very long, robust arms and a short mantle with small, rounded fins. Their main distinguishing feature is that the eyes are different sizes and orient in different vertical directions. The larger left eye is semitubular, mobile, generally is directed back and up as indicated by the pattern of iridophores on the eye's outer surface. This means that when the squid is positioned obliquely the eye is pointed upwards towards the surface. It is thought that this is used to detect animals above the squid silhouetted against the sun during the day. The right eye has a normal shape and is oriented laterally and slightly downward. This arrangement gives the family the common name of cock-eyed squid.

== Genera and species ==
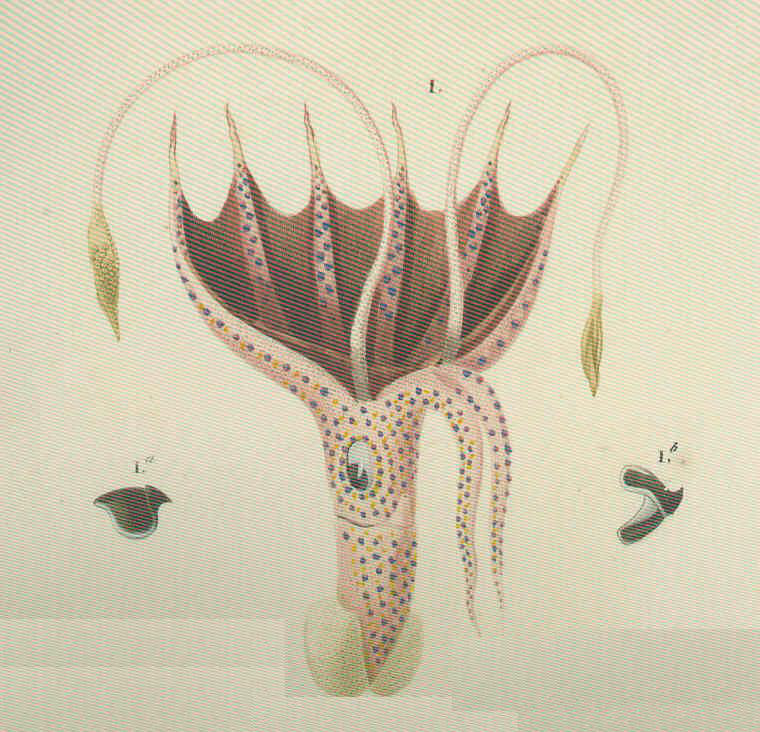
Illustration of Histioteuthis bonnellii

There are two genera which are included in the Histioteuthidae and a total of circa 19 species:

- Histioteuthis d'Orbigny, 1841
  - Histioteuthis atlantica (Hoyle, 1885)
  - Histioteuthis berryi Voss, 1969
  - Histioteuthis bonnellii (Férussac, 1834)
  - Histioteuthis celetaria (Voss, 1960)
  - Histioteuthis cerasina Nesis, 1971
  - Histioteuthis corona (Voss & Voss, 1962)
  - Histioteuthis eltaninae Voss, 1969
  - Histioteuthis heteropsis (Berry, 1913)
  - Histioteuthis inermis (Taki, 1964)
  - Histioteuthis macrohista Voss, 1969
  - Histioteuthis meleagroteuthis (Chun, 1910)
  - Histioteuthis miranda (Berry, 1918)
  - Histioteuthis oceani (Robson, 1948)
  - Histioteuthis pacifica (Voss, 1962)
  - Histioteuthis reversa (Verrill, 1880)
- Stigmatoteuthis Pfeffer, 1900
  - Stigmatoteuthis arcturi Robson, 1948
  - Stigmatoteuthis dofleini Pfeffer, 1912
  - Stigmatoteuthis hoylei (Goodrich, 1896)
