= Histioteuthis oceani =

Conservation status
- Least Concern (IUCN 3.1)

Scientific classification
- Kingdom: Animalia
- Phylum: Mollusca
- Class: Cephalopoda
- Order: Oegopsida
- Family: Histioteuthidae
- Genus: Histioteuthis
- Species: H. oceani

Binomial name
- Histioteuthis oceani (Robson, 1948)

Species of squid

Histioteuthis oceani is a species of cock-eyed squid. The species can be found residing within the Atlantic and Pacific oceans.
