= Histioteuthis berryi =

Conservation status
- Data Deficient (IUCN 3.1)

Scientific classification
- Kingdom: Animalia
- Phylum: Mollusca
- Class: Cephalopoda
- Order: Oegopsida
- Family: Histioteuthidae
- Genus: Histioteuthis
- Species: H. berryi

Binomial name
- Histioteuthis berryi (Voss, 1969)

Synonyms
- Histioteuthis berryi (Voss, 1969)

Species of squid

Histioteuthis berryi is a species of cock-eyed squid. The species believed to reside largely in the North Atlantic Ocean, and have also been observed off the coast of California.
