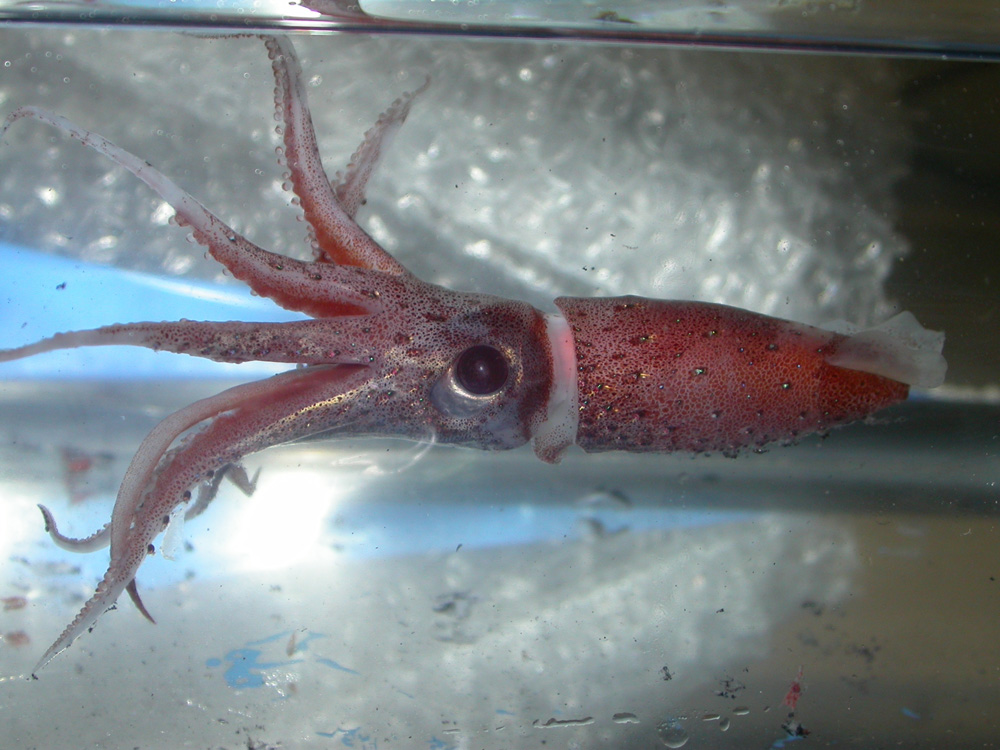

Conservation status
- Least Concern (IUCN 3.1)

Scientific classification
- Kingdom: Animalia
- Phylum: Mollusca
- Class: Cephalopoda
- Order: Oegopsida
- Family: Histioteuthidae
- Genus: Histioteuthis
- Species: H. reversa

Binomial name
- Histioteuthis reversa (Verrill, 1880)

Synonyms
- Calliteuthis elongata Voss & Voss, 1962; Calliteuthis meneghinii Pfeffer, 1912; Calliteuthis reversa Verrill, 1880; Histioteuthis elongata (Voss & Voss, 1962); Histioteuthis elongatus (Voss & Voss, 1962); Histioteuthis reversus (Verrill, 1880); Stigmatoteuthis verrilli Pfeffer, 1912

= Histioteuthis reversa =

Reverse jewel squid

Species of squid

Histioteuthis reversa, commonly known as the reverse jewel squid or the elongate jewel squid, is a species of cock-eyed squid, so called because the eyes are dissimilar. It occurs at moderate depths in the Atlantic Ocean and the Mediterranean Sea. It is also known from the Indian Ocean.

== Description ==
Histioteuthis reversa grows to a mantle length of about 19 cm (7.5 in). The head bears four pairs of robust arms, a pair of tentacles and two unequal-sized eyes and the main body mass is enclosed in the mantle. The arms are less than one and a half times the length of the mantle. The outer arms are not joined to each other by a web and the inner arms are connected by a vestigial web remnant. The suckers on the arms are globular, usually with teeth on the margin, and the suckers on the terminal portion of the tentacles are in five or six rows, with larger suckers in the central rows. The mantle is cup-shaped and elongates considerably in females when they mature. The fins are a third to a half the length of the mantle and roughly half its width. The ventral (under) surface of the mantle has a complex arrangement of large and small compound light-emitting photophores, and seventeen large and one small photophore surround the right eye. In front of the left eye there are seven large photophores and the eye is ringed by ten to fourteen small ones.

== Distribution ==
Histioteuthis reversa is native to the Atlantic Ocean and the Mediterranean Sea. It is mostly found in the northern hemisphere but also occurs off the coast of Namibia and South Africa. The northern limit of its range is the Newfoundland and the seas south of Iceland at 52° North. It does not occur in the Gulf of Mexico and is uncommon in the Caribbean Sea. It has been recorded in the southern Indian Ocean. It is found in the upper waters of the open sea, often at depths of between 600 and 800 m (1,969 and 2,625 ft), and frequently in the vicinity of seamounts and other undersea features, perhaps because primary production is greater in these areas.

== Ecology ==
Little is known of the behaviour and ecology of this squid but it seems to breed over the continental slope as juveniles in the size range 2 to 4 cm (0.8 to 1.6 in) have been found there. Adults are eaten by various cetaceans including sperm whales (Physeter macrocephalus), pygmy sperm whales (Kogia breviceps) and Risso's dolphin (Grampus griseus), a fact confirmed by examining the stomach contents of stranded animals among which the indigestible beaks of the squids are found.

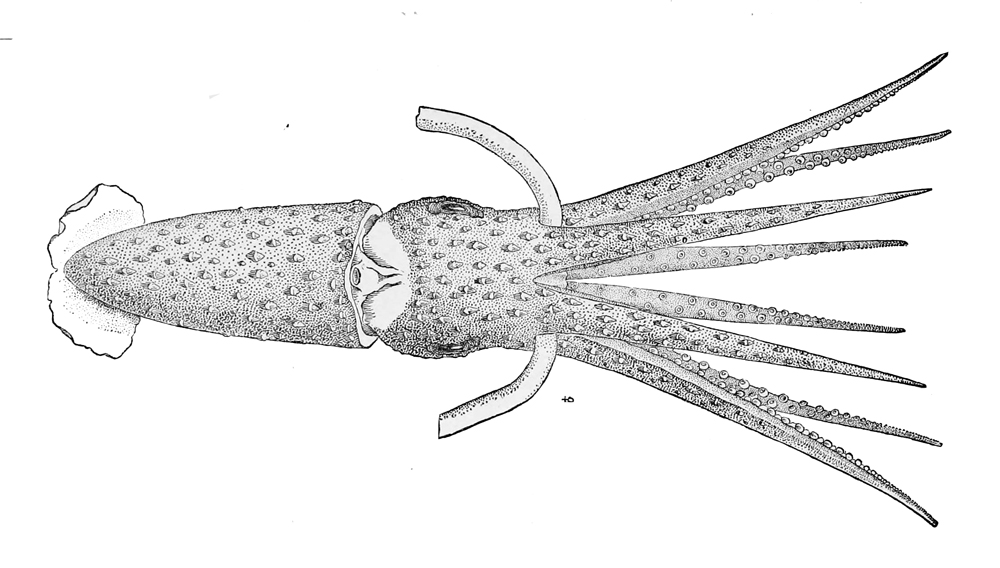
Ventral view with tentacles removed

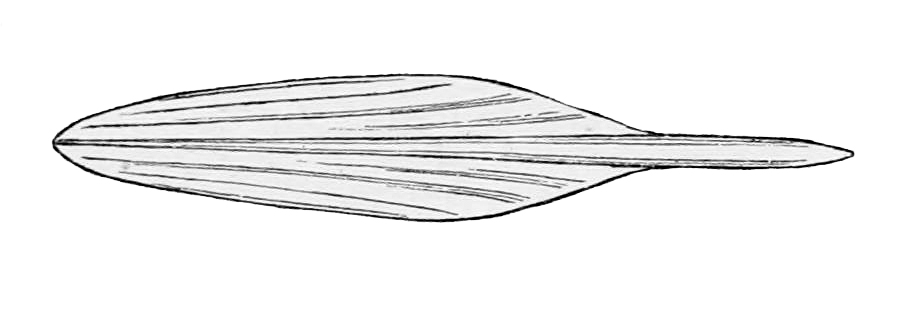
Gladius

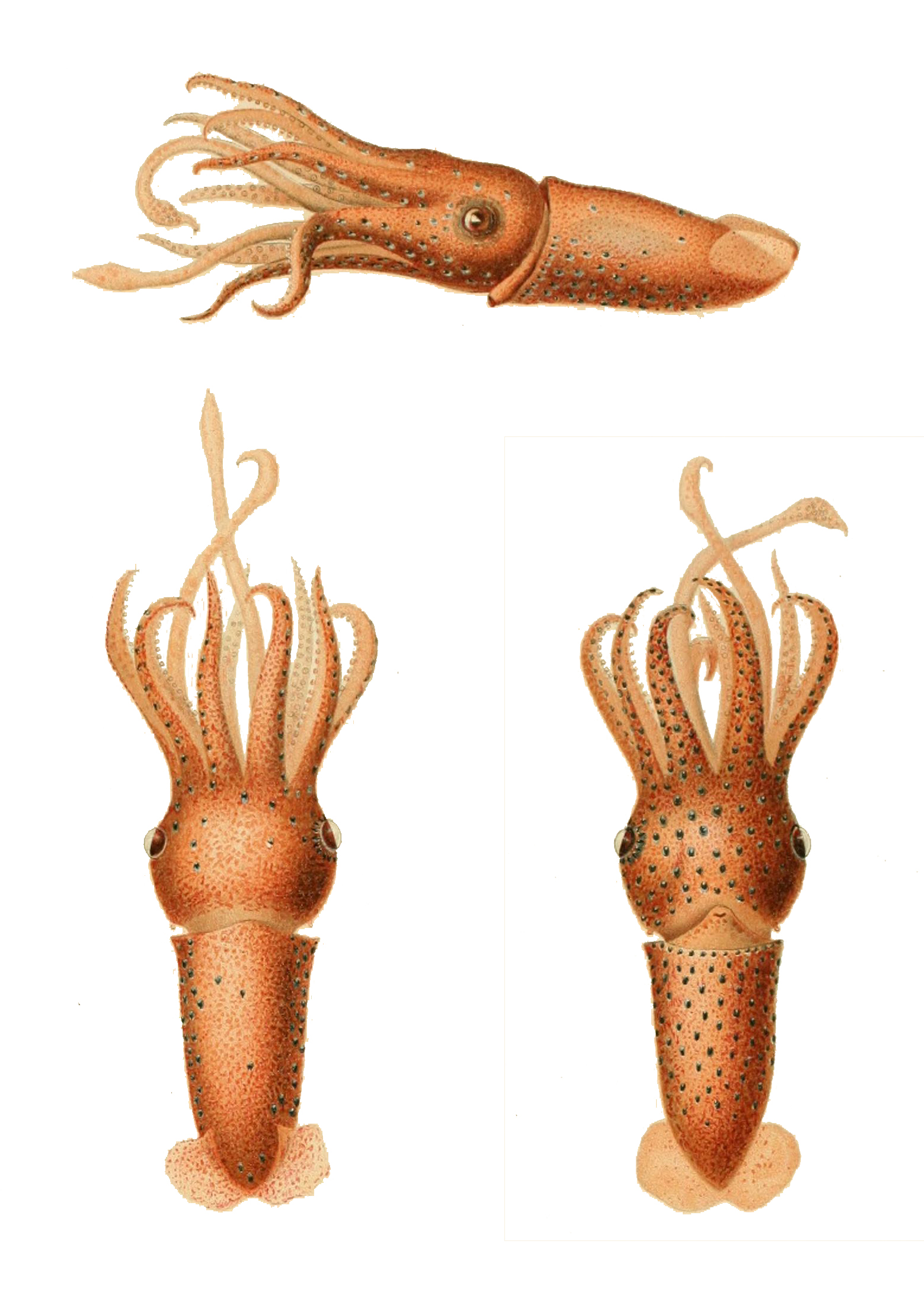
Clockwise from top: lateral, ventral and dorsal views
