= Histioteuthis atlantica =

Conservation status
- Least Concern (IUCN 3.1)

Scientific classification
- Kingdom: Animalia
- Phylum: Mollusca
- Class: Cephalopoda
- Order: Oegopsida
- Family: Histioteuthidae
- Genus: Histioteuthis
- Species: H. atlantica

Binomial name
- Histioteuthis atlantica (Hoyle, 1885)

Synonyms
- Histiopsis atlantica Hoyle, 1885

Species of squid

Histioteuthis atlantica is a species of cock-eyed squid. The species has been observed an estimated 92 times since records began, all off the coast of southern Australia, particularly near Tasmania. It was described by zoologist William Evans Hoyle in 1885.
