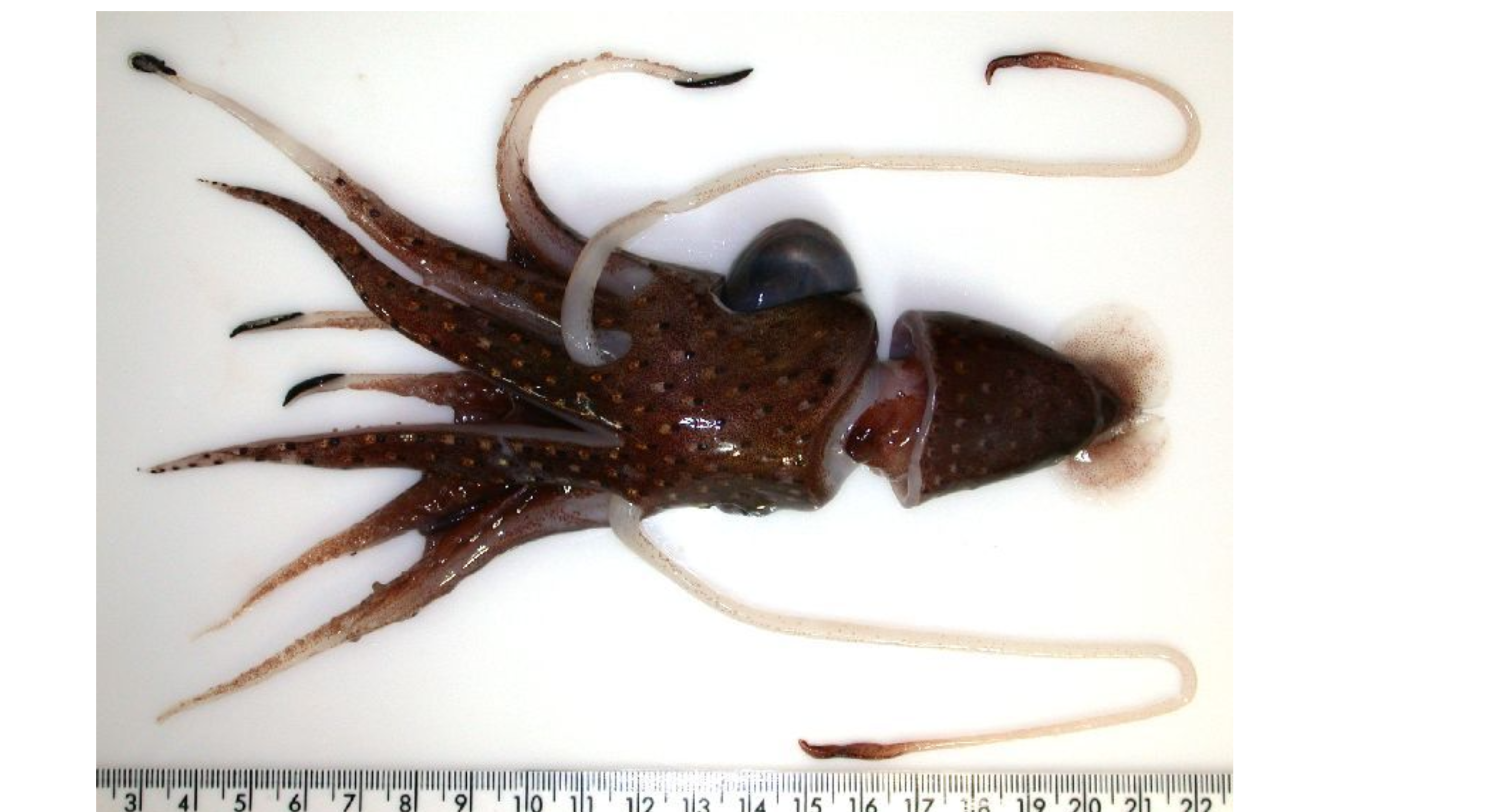
- Preserved specimen of Histioteuthis macrohista

Conservation status
- Least Concern (IUCN 3.1)

Scientific classification
- Kingdom: Animalia
- Phylum: Mollusca
- Class: Cephalopoda
- Order: Oegopsida
- Family: Histioteuthidae
- Genus: Histioteuthis
- Species: H. macrohista

Binomial name
- Histioteuthis macrohista Voss, 1969

= Histioteuthis macrohista =

Deep-webbed cock-eyed squid

Species of squid

Histioteuthis macrohista, known by the common names deep-webbed cock-eyed squid, plain jewel squid, plain cock-eyed squid and deep-webbed jewel squid is a species of cock-eyed squid. The species has been documented ~35 times off of the southern coast of Australia, and has also been observed in New Zealand.
