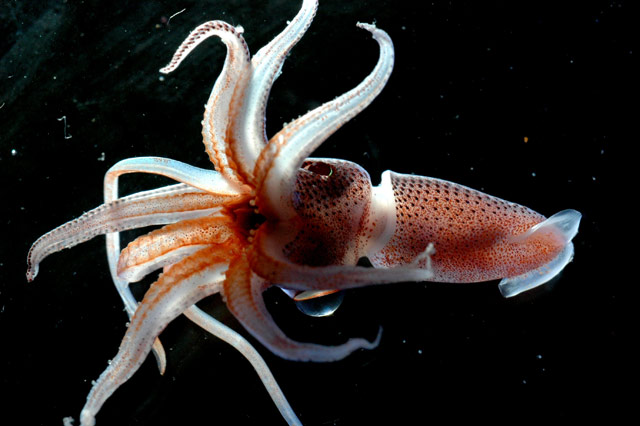
- A member of the genus Histioteuthis. Eye asymmetry is observable.

Scientific classification
- Kingdom: Animalia
- Phylum: Mollusca
- Class: Cephalopoda
- Order: Oegopsida
- Family: Histioteuthidae
- Genus: Histioteuthis; Orbigny, 1841

Type species
- Cranchia bonnellii Férussac, 1834

Species
- 17 species and subspecies, see text

Synonyms
- Calliteuthis Verrill, 1880; Histiopsis Hoyle, 1885; Histiothauma Robson, 1948; Hoylia Cossmann, 1900; Lolidona Risso, 1854; Meleagroteuthis Pfeffer, 1900

= Histioteuthis =

Genus of cephalopods known as cock-eyed squids

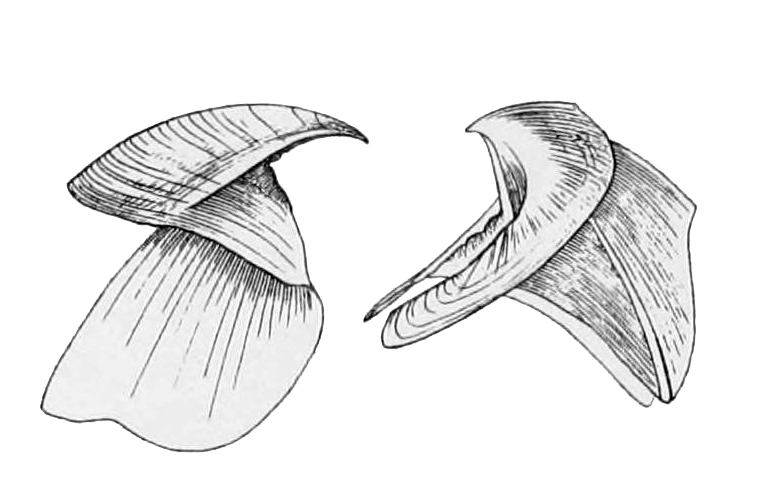
Beak of Histioteuthis bonnellii

Histioteuthis is a genus of squid in the family Histioteuthidae. It goes by the common name cock-eyed squid, because in all species the right eye is normal-sized, round, blue and sunken; whereas the left eye is at least twice the diameter of the right eye, tubular, yellow-green, faces upward, and bulges out of the head.

In 2017, researchers at Duke University established that Histioteuthis uses its larger eye to see ambient sunlight, and its smaller eye to detect bioluminescence from prey animals.

The name is composed of the Greek histion (ἱστίον, "sail", a large webbed membrane between six of the arms, in some species) and teuthis ("squid").

The genus contains bioluminescent species.

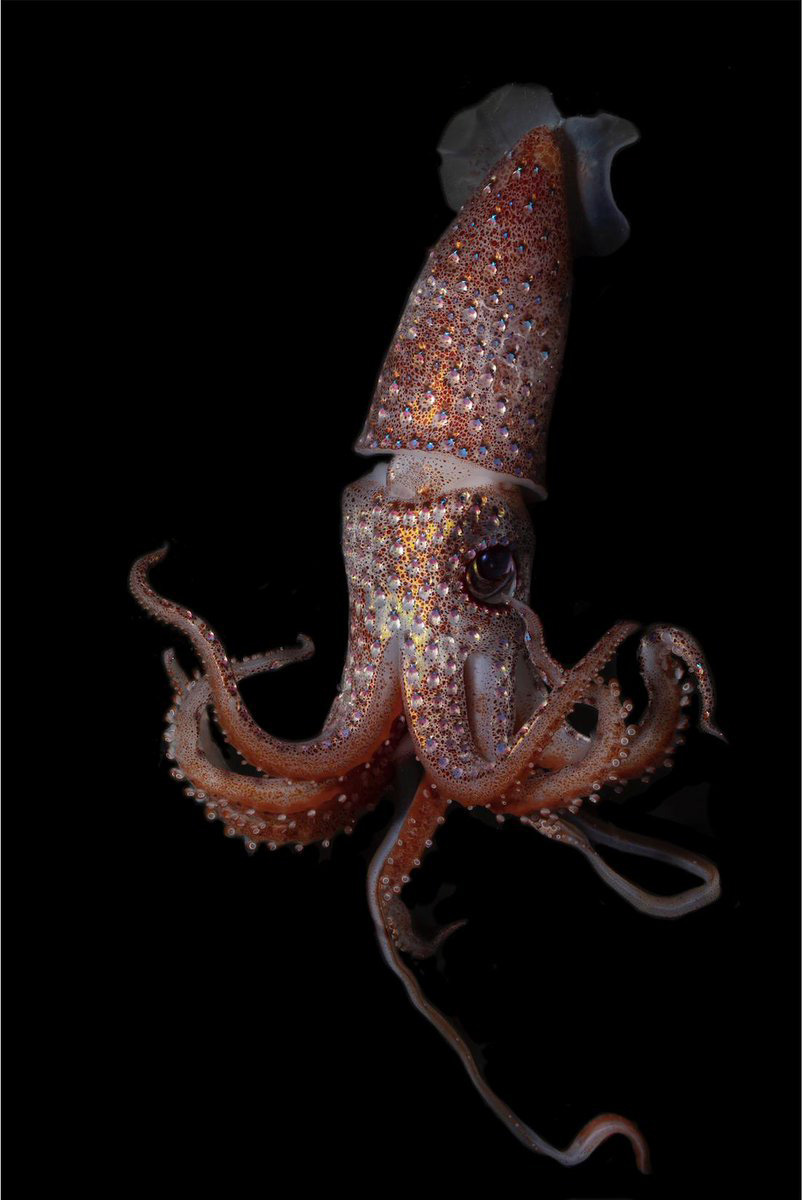
Histioteuthis sp.

== Species ==
- H. bonnellii species-group
  - Histioteuthis bonnellii, umbrella squid
  - Histioteuthis macrohista
- H. reversa species-group
  - Histioteuthis eltaninae
  - Histioteuthis atlantica
  - Histioteuthis reversa, reverse jewel squid
- H. celetaria species-group
  - Histioteuthis celetaria, elegant jewel squid
  - Histioteuthis pacifica
- H. corona species-group
  - Histioteuthis berryi
  - Histioteuthis cerasina
  - Histioteuthis corona
  - Histioteuthis inermis
- H. miranda species-group
  - Histioteuthis miranda
  - Histioteuthis oceani
- H. meleagroteuthis species-group
  - Histioteuthis heteropsis, strawberry squid
  - Histioteuthis meleagroteuthis, pearly jewel squid
