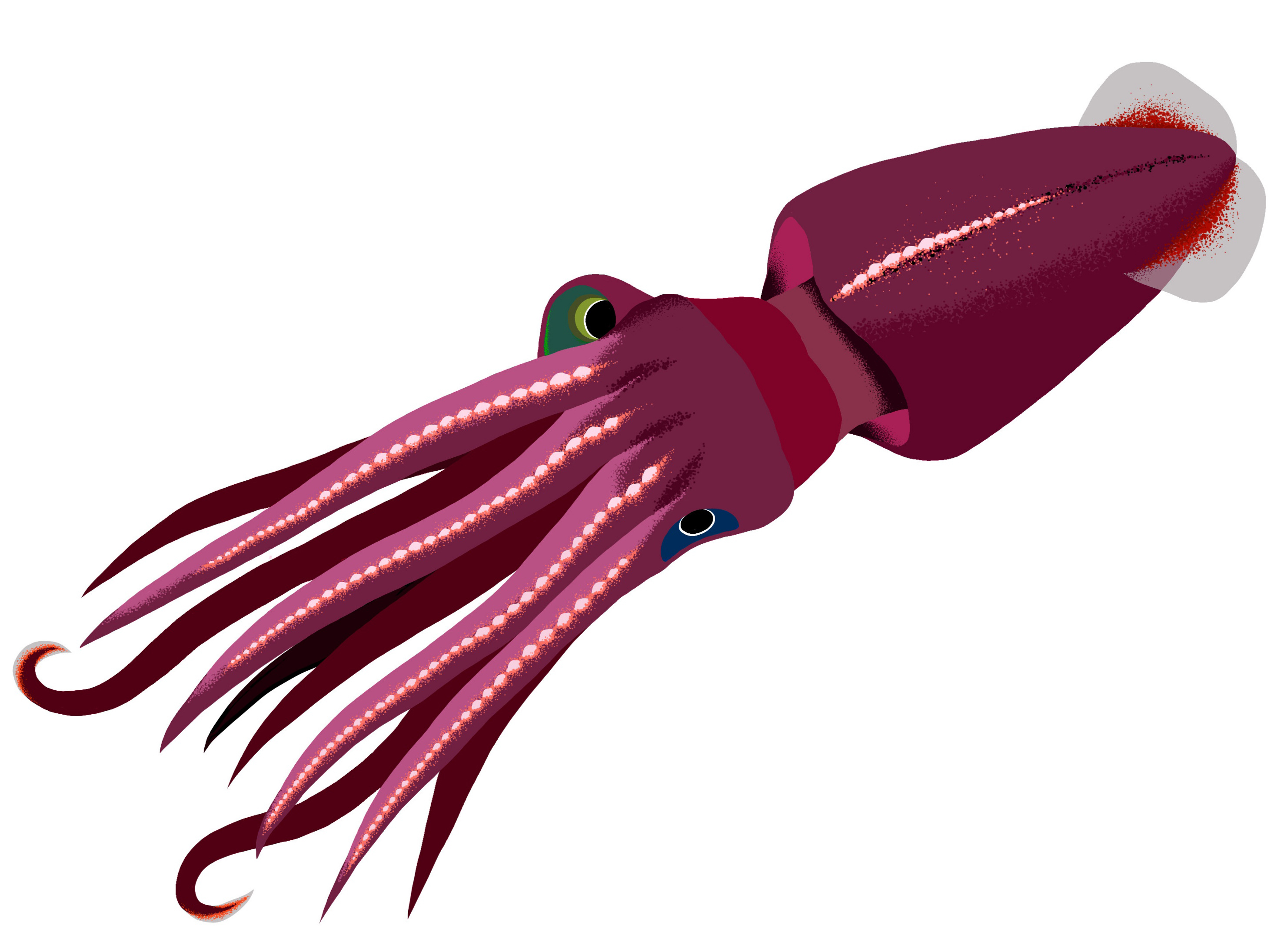

Conservation status
- Least Concern (IUCN 3.1)

Scientific classification
- Kingdom: Animalia
- Phylum: Mollusca
- Class: Cephalopoda
- Order: Oegopsida
- Family: Histioteuthidae
- Genus: Histioteuthis
- Species: H. meleagroteuthis

Binomial name
- Histioteuthis meleagroteuthis (Chun, 1910)

= Histioteuthis meleagroteuthis =

Species of squid

Histioteuthis meleagroteuthis is a species of squid in the family Histioteuthidae, also known as pearly jewel squid. They are small to medium squids that have a dark, wine-red skin pigment. Females at maturity average at 114 mm (4.5 in) in length, while males at maturity average at 65 to 102 mm (2.6 to 4.0 in) in length. This species is characterized by tubercles, photophores, and asymmetric features. This species can be found in circumglobal, mesopelagic waters.

== Description ==
=== Tubercles ===
Histioteuthis meleagroteuthis have a line of protuberant tubercles which run along the front of the dorsal midline on the squid's mantle. These tubercles are cartilaginous and are very stiff. In the young stages of development, small tubercles can be found in a row on the mantle and more tubercles appear throughout development.

=== Photophores ===
Compound photophores are found on the anterior of the mantle in a very condensed, uniformly small design. Photophores are complex organs that emit light. These photophores were examined and studied in depth on a close relative, Histioteuthis bonnellii. This data states that the photophores are produced by a glandular complex and are composed of photogenic cells.

=== Asymmetry ===
The species within genus Histioteuthis have very distinct asymmetry in their eyes, most likely an adaptation from their mesopelagic environment. These varieties between the eyes can include shape, size, and lens pigmentation. The most noticeable difference is in the eyes sizes, with the left being measurably bigger than the right. This is thought to be because of the two different light sources in their environment, with the bigger eye oriented upwards, and the smaller eye oriented downwards. In this case, the larger eye pointed upwards can take in the faint light shining down from the oceans surface, while the smaller eye can utilize bioluminescent light.

== Habitat ==
Histioteuthis meleagroteuthis are mesopelagic, inhabiting water with a depth range of 0–1,950 metres (0–6,398 ft). This species has been found in tropical and subtropical oceans spanning the globe and seem to be more abundant in areas with slopes of land. The species has not been identified in the transitional waters of Peru-Chile and California currents.

== Behavior ==
=== Mating ===
Histioteuthis meleagroteuthis have both male and female sexes. Both sexes live fairly short life spans and generally die soon after reproducing, which is done sexually and involves spawning and brooding. Males perform numerous displays of courtship in order to attract females for reproduction. Males possess a specialized arm called a hectocotylus, which is inserted into the female's mantle cavity and is used to transfer spermatophores. After fertilization, the female will eject the eggs into a hiding spot where they will hatch in about two weeks.
