= Mastigotragus =

Conservation status
- Data Deficient (IUCN 3.1)

Scientific classification
- Kingdom: Animalia
- Phylum: Mollusca
- Class: Cephalopoda
- Order: Oegopsida
- Family: Mastigoteuthidae
- Genus: Mastigotragus; Young, Vecchione & Braid, 2014
- Species: M. pyrodes

Binomial name
- Mastigotragus pyrodes (Young, 1972)

Synonyms
- Mastigoteuthis pyrodes Young, 1972

Genus of squids

Mastigotragus is a genus of whip-lash squid containing a single species, Mastigotragus pyrodes. This species was originally placed within Mastigoteuthis, but was described as a new genus due to multiple morphological characters distinct from Mastigoteuthis. This genus is characterized by a lack of antitragus in the funnel-locking cartilage, larger sucker rings on the tentacles, a particular photophore morphology, and relatively large eyelid photophore. The generic name is Latin for 'whip-lash goat'. The type specimen was collected in the North Pacific off the coast of southern California at 33°32'N, 118°23'W Eastern North Pacific; since then the species has also been recorded in northern Hawaiian waters between latitudes 23°N-28°N.
