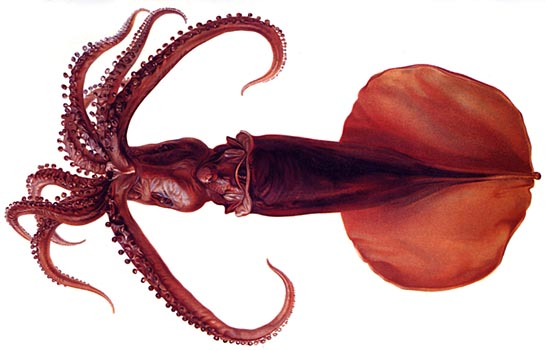
- Mastigoteuthis magna

Scientific classification
- Domain: Eukaryota
- Kingdom: Animalia
- Phylum: Mollusca
- Class: Cephalopoda
- Order: Oegopsida
- Family: Mastigoteuthidae
- Genus: Magnoteuthis; Salcedo-Vargas & Okutani, 1994

Type species
- Mastigoteuthis magna Joubin, 1913

= Magnoteuthis =

Genus of squids

Magnoteuthis is a genus of whip-lash squid containing at least three species. Some teuthologists consider Idioteuthis or Mastigoteuthis synonymous with this taxon, but it is genetically and morphologically distinct.

== Species ==
- Genus Magnoteuthis
  - Magnoteuthis magna (Joubin, 1913)
  - Magnoteuthis microlucens (Young, Lindgren & Vecchione, 2008)
  - Magnoteuthis osheai Braid & Bolstad, 2015
