= Cephalopod limb =

Limbs of cephalopod molluscs

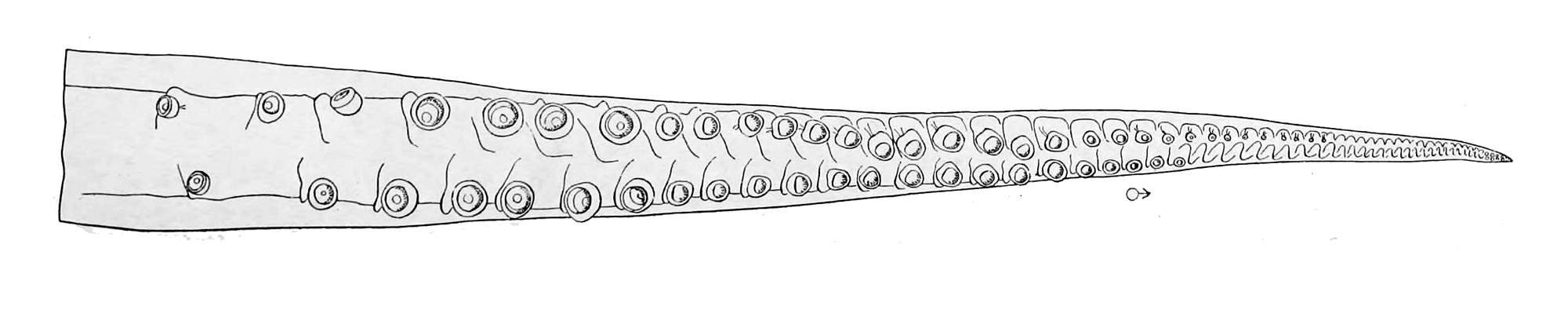
Arm of Illex illecebrosus with two rows of suckers along its length

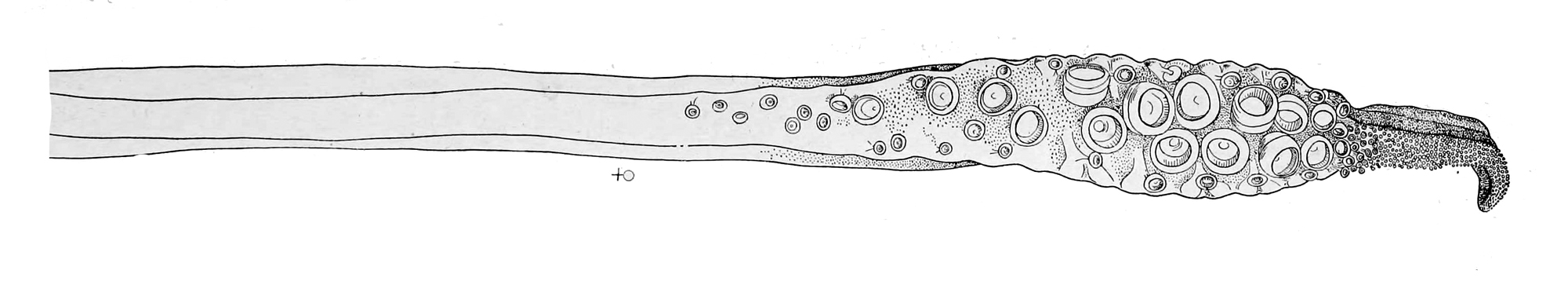
Tentacle of Illex illecebrosus with a distal tentacular club (right)

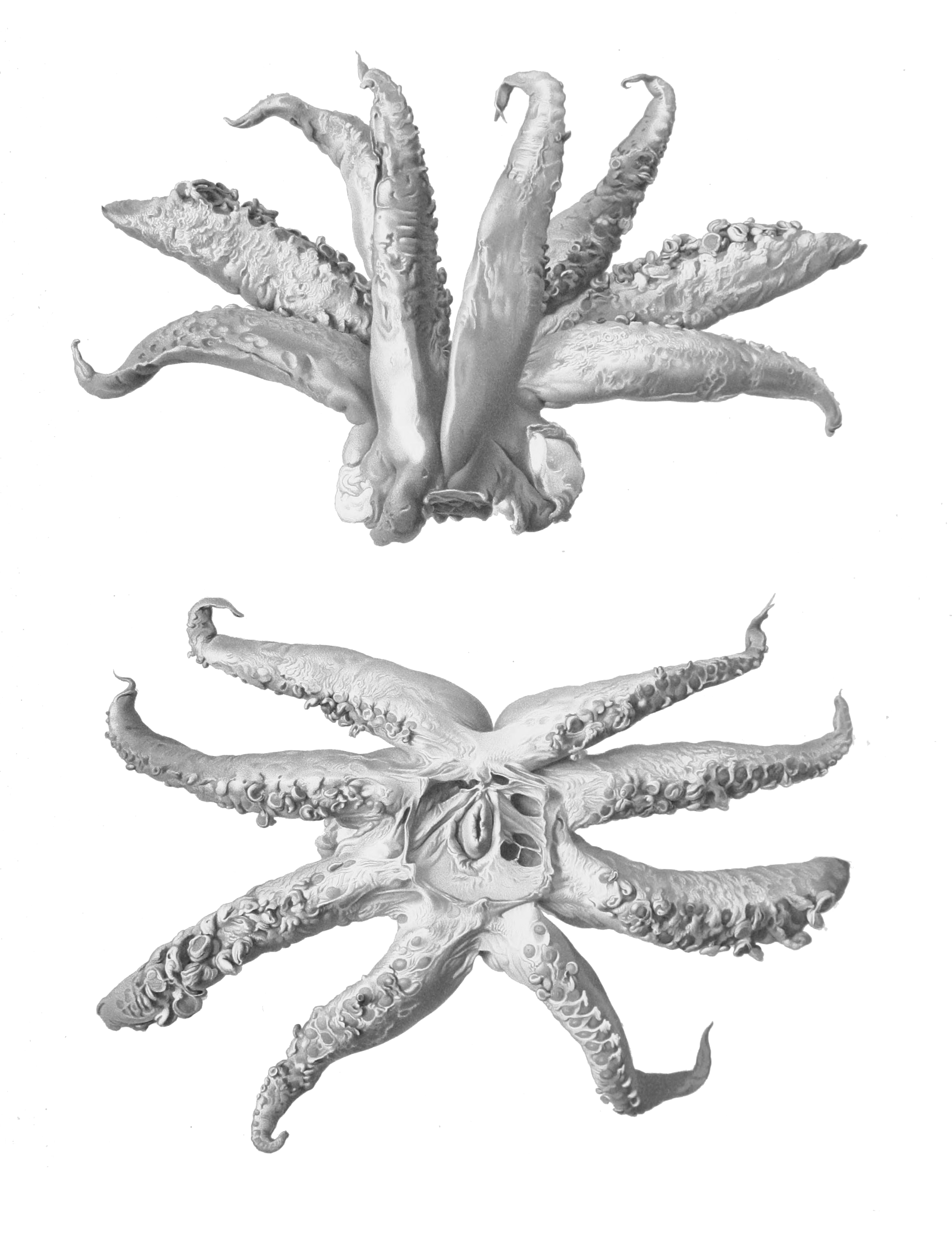
Arms and buccal mass of the squid Taningia danae. As in other Octopoteuthidae, the tentacles are absent in adults.

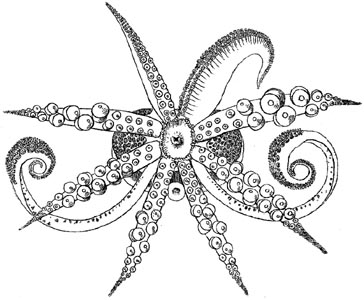
Oral view of the bobtail squid Semirossia tenera

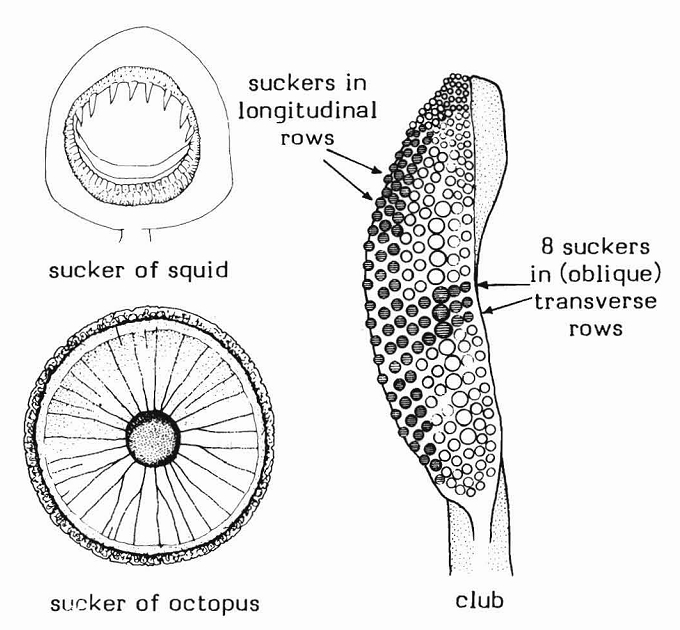
Cephalopod suckers and configuration of suckers on tentacular club

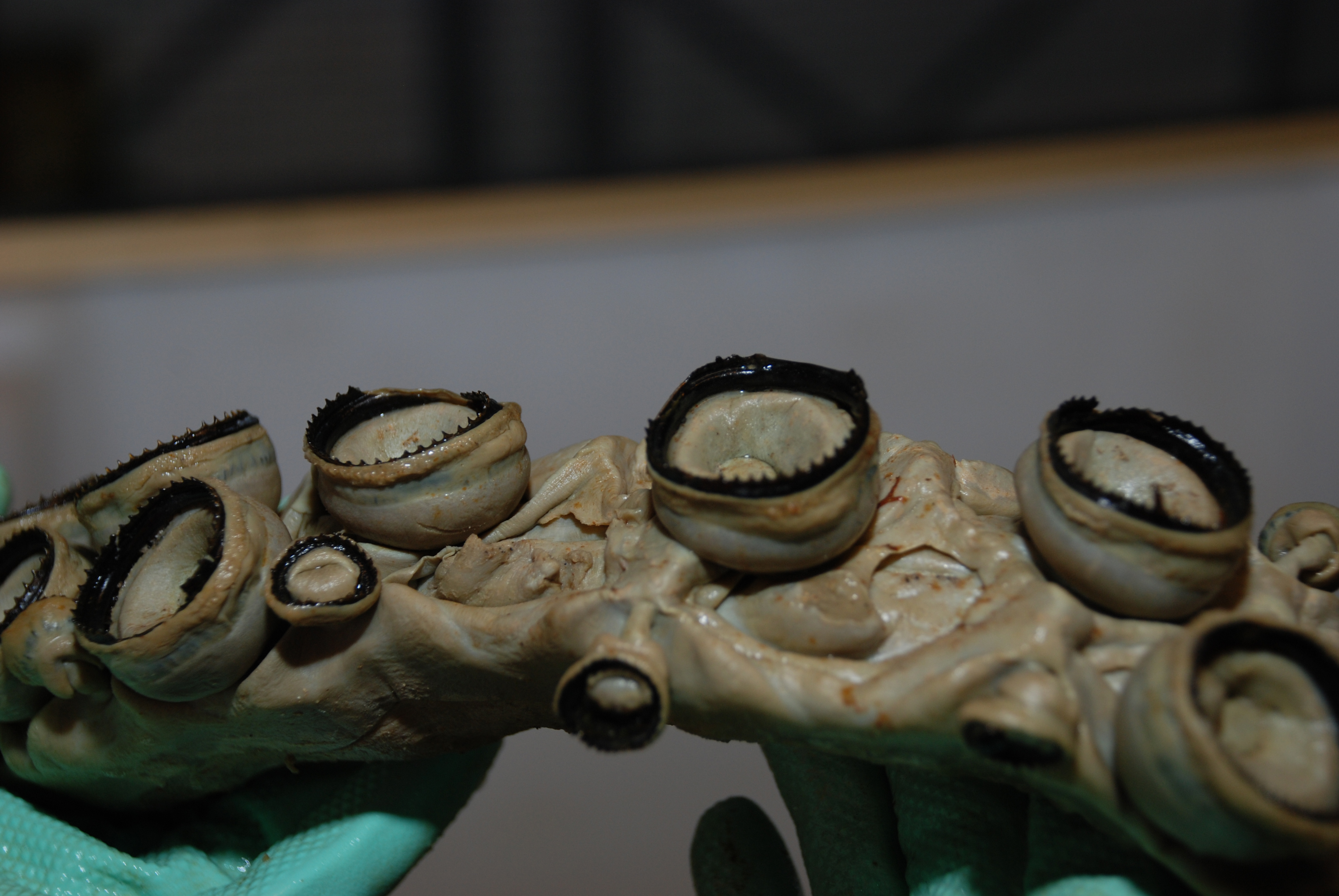
Serrated suckers of a giant squid

All cephalopods possess flexible limbs extending from their heads and surrounding their beaks. These appendages, which function as muscular hydrostats, have been variously termed arms, legs or tentacles. (Note: A study has determined that the octopus has two legs and six arms, often commonly referred to as "tentacles". Another study found that there is a functional difference in the way the appendages are used for task division. "These findings give evidence for limb-specialization in an animal whose 8 arms were believed to be equipotential." The two rear appendages are generally used to walk on the sea floor, while the other six are used to forage for food.)

== Description ==
In the scientific literature, a cephalopod arm is often treated as distinct from a tentacle, though the terms are sometimes used interchangeably, often with the latter acting as an umbrella term for cephalopod limbs. Generally, arms have suckers along most of their length, as opposed to tentacles, which have suckers only near their ends. Barring a few exceptions, octopuses have eight arms and no tentacles, while squid and cuttlefish have eight arms (or two "legs" and six "arms") and two tentacles. The limbs of nautiluses, which number around 90 and lack suckers altogether, are called cirri.

The tentacles of Decapodiformes are thought to be derived from the fourth arm pair of the ancestral coleoid, but the term arms IV is used to refer to the subsequent, ventral arm pair in modern animals (which is evolutionarily the fifth arm pair).

The males of most cephalopods develop a specialised arm for sperm delivery, the hectocotylus.

Cephalopod limbs function using a core of transverse muscle mass with a ring of longitudinally-oriented muscles embedded near its edge. The transverse muscle is wrapped by circular muscle fibres. The circular muscles are in turn wrapped by a pair of helical muscles with opposing handedness. Since the volume of each limb remains relatively constant, a decrease in one dimension causes an increase in another. For example, when the transverse and circular muscles contract, the cross-secional area of the limb is reduced. The limb's volume must remain constant so its length increases as a result. Likewise when the longitudinal muscles contract, the limb shortens and so the transverse muscle extends to increase the cross-sectional area.

== Suckers ==
Cephalopod limbs bear numerous suckers along their ventral surface as in octopus, squid and cuttlefish arms and in clusters at the ends of the tentacles (if present), as in squid and cuttlefish. Each sucker is usually circular and bowl-like and has two distinct parts: an outer shallow cavity called an infundibulum and a central hollow cavity called an acetabulum. Both of these structures are thick muscles, and are covered with a chitinous cuticle to make a protective surface. Suckers are used for grasping substratum, catching prey and for locomotion. When a sucker attaches itself to an object, the infundibulum mainly provides adhesion while the central acetabulum is free. Sequential muscle contraction of the infundibulum and acetabulum causes attachment and detachment.

== Keel ==
The keel, more specifically known as the swimming membrane or swimming keel, is a muscular extension, membrane, or vane on the aboral surface of coleoid limbs. These keels are composed of a core of non-fibrous connective tissue interlaced with transverse muscle bundles, which are encased in a layer of longitudinal muscle fibres which extend towards the keel's edge. The keels presumably streamline and improve the hydrodynamic characteristics of cephalopod arms, though this property has not been verified.

== Abnormalities ==
Many octopus arm anomalies have been recorded, including a 6-armed octopus (nicknamed Henry the Hexapus), a 7-armed octopus, a 10-armed Octopus briareus, one with a forked arm tip, octopuses with double or bilateral hectocotylization, and specimens with up to 96 arm branches.

Branched arms and other limb abnormalities have also been recorded in cuttlefish, squid, and bobtail squid.

== Variability ==
Cephalopod limbs and the suckers they bear are shaped in many distinctive ways, and vary considerably between species. Some examples are shown below.

=== Arms ===
For hectocotylized arms see hectocotylus variability.

Shape of arm	Species	Family
	Todarodes pacificus	Ommastrephidae

=== Tentacular clubs ===
Shape of tentacular club	Species	Family
	Abraliopsis morisi	Enoploteuthidae
	Ancistroteuthis lichtensteini	Onychoteuthidae
	Architeuthis sp.	Architeuthidae
	Austrorossia mastigophora	Sepiolidae
	Berryteuthis magister	Gonatidae
	Idioteuthis cordiformis	Mastigoteuthidae
	Iridoteuthis iris	Sepiolidae
	Mastigoteuthis glaukopis	Mastigoteuthidae
	Onykia ingens	Onychoteuthidae
	Semirossia tenera	Sepiolidae
	Spirula spirula	Spirulidae
	Todarodes pacificus	Ommastrephidae

=== Suckers ===
Shape of sucker	Species	Family
	Idioteuthis cordiformis	Mastigoteuthidae
	Idioteuthis latipinna	Mastigoteuthidae
	Magnapinna talismani	Magnapinnidae
	Mastigoteuthis agassizii	Mastigoteuthidae
	Mastigoteuthis atlantica	Mastigoteuthidae
	Mastigoteuthis dentata	Mastigoteuthidae
	Mastigoteuthis grimaldii	Mastigoteuthidae
	Mastigoteuthis magna	Mastigoteuthidae
