= Mastigopsis =

Conservation status
- Data Deficient (IUCN 3.1)

Scientific classification
- Domain: Eukaryota
- Kingdom: Animalia
- Phylum: Mollusca
- Class: Cephalopoda
- Order: Oegopsida
- Family: Mastigoteuthidae
- Genus: Mastigopsis; Grimpe, 1922
- Species: M. hjortii

Binomial name
- Mastigopsis hjortii (Chun, 1913)

Synonyms
- Mastigoteuthis hjorti Chun, 1913; Idioteuthis hjorti (Chun, 1913)

Genus of squids

Mastigopsis is a genus of whip-lash squid containing one single species, Mastigopsis hjorti. Some teuthologists consider Idioteuthis synonymous with this taxon; however, genetic results indicate that this genus is not closely related with Idioteuthis but actually closer to Magnoteuthis.

== Description ==
Mastigopsis hjorti is similar to Idioteuthis cordiformis in that it has large fins, skin tubercles, no pocket between the bridles and the large dividing, protective membranes on the tentacular clubs but the main difference is that this species has photophores on its eyes. The suckers on the tentacular club are all of similar size, except for those nearest the tip. The funnel has a locking-apparatus which has an oval, slightly curved depression and towards the posterior its sides protrude having no cartilaginous fleshy projections. The fins are large and measure around 90% of the length of the mantle. The mantle, head, funnel and the aboral surface of the arms in subadults are covered in large tubercles. There are two large circular photophores placed on the lower surface of eyeball. The maximum mantle length attained is 100 mm.

== Distribution ==
Mastigopsis hjorti has a wide distribution and is possibly a tropical-subtropical circumglobal species which ranges north as far as 40°N although the southern limits have yet to be determined. It has been recorded in the North Atlantic Ocean from the eastern parts of the Gulf of Mexico, as far north as Bermuda and the Gulf of Maine. It has also been recorded off South Africa in the eastern Atlantic, from the central Pacific Ocean and from the Indian Ocean. The taxonomic status of the populations in oceans other than the Atlantic are uncertain.
