= Idioteuthis okutanii =

Scientific classification
- Domain: Eukaryota
- Kingdom: Animalia
- Phylum: Mollusca
- Class: Cephalopoda
- Order: Oegopsida
- Family: Mastigoteuthidae
- Genus: Idioteuthis
- Species: I. okutanii

Binomial name
- Idioteuthis okutanii Salcedo-Vargas, 1997

Species of squid

Idioteuthis okutanii is a species of whip-lash squid. Richard E. Young and Michael Vecchione consider I. okutanii to be a junior synonym of I. hjorti.
