= Magnapinna pacifica =

- Holotype of Magnapinna pacifica (51-millimetre or 2-inch ML)

Conservation status
- Data Deficient (IUCN 3.1)

Scientific classification
- Domain: Eukaryota
- Kingdom: Animalia
- Phylum: Mollusca
- Class: Cephalopoda
- Order: Oegopsida
- Family: Magnapinnidae
- Genus: Magnapinna
- Species: M. pacifica

Binomial name
- Magnapinna pacifica Vecchione & Young, 1998

Species of squid

Magnapinna pacifica is a species of bigfin squid known only from three immature specimens; two caught at a depth of less than 300 m (980 ft) and one from a fish stomach. M. pacifica is the type species of the genus Magnapinna. It is characterised primarily by its proximal tentacles, which are wider than adjacent arms and bear numerous suckers.

M. pacifica was described in 1998 by Michael Vecchione and Richard E. Young based on three specimens. The holotype is a juvenile specimen of 51-millimetre (2 in) mantle length (ML), taken off the Californian coast at a depth of 0–200 m (0–660 ft) in a Bongo plankton net. The paratype (USNM 885787), a juvenile specimen of 49-millimetre (1.9 in) ML, was found in the stomach of a lancetfish (Alepisaurus ferox). It had initially dried out and was later reconstituted. The third individual, a 19.1-millimetre (0.75 in) ML paralarva, was taken off Hawaii at a depth of 0–300 m (0–980 ft) in a 4-square-metre (43 sq ft) plankton net.

A 2001 observation of an adult long-arm squid off Hawaii by the ROV Tiburon has been assigned to M. pacifica by Vecchione and Young.

== Bibliography ==
- Vecchione, M. & Young, R. E. (1998). "The Magnapinnidae, a newly discovered family of oceanic squids (Cephalopoda; Oegopsida)". South African Journal of Marine Science 20: 429-437.
