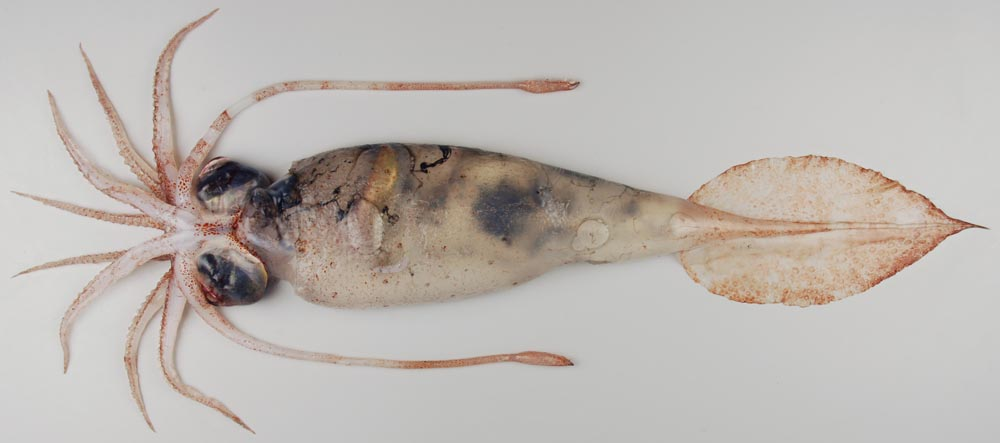
- Galiteuthis glacialis

Scientific classification
- Kingdom: Animalia
- Phylum: Mollusca
- Class: Cephalopoda
- Order: Oegopsida
- Family: Cranchiidae
- Subfamily: Taoniinae
- Genus: Galiteuthis; Joubin, 1898

Type species
- Galiteuthis armata Joubin, 1898

Species
- see text

Synonyms
- Crystalloteuthis Chun, 1906; Phasmatoteuthion Pfeffer, 1912; Taonidium Pfeffer, 1900

= Galiteuthis =

Genus of squids

Galiteuthis is a genus of glass squids from the family Cranchiidae and the subfamily Taoniinae. Squids in the genus Galiteuthis are large squids with mantle lengths measuring up to 66 cm (26 in), although it has been suggested that mantle length could reach as much as 2.7 m (8 ft 10 in). The most distinctive feature of the species in this genus are they have hooks on the tentacular clubs while there are no hooks on the arms, and by their long, thin, terminal fins.

The genus contains bioluminescent species.

== Species ==
Five species are currently recognised:

- Galiteuthis armata Joubin, 1898
- Galiteuthis glacialis (Chun, 1906)
- Galiteuthis pacifica (Robson, 1948)
- Galiteuthis phyllura Berry, 1911
- Galiteuthis suhmi (Hoyle, 1886)
