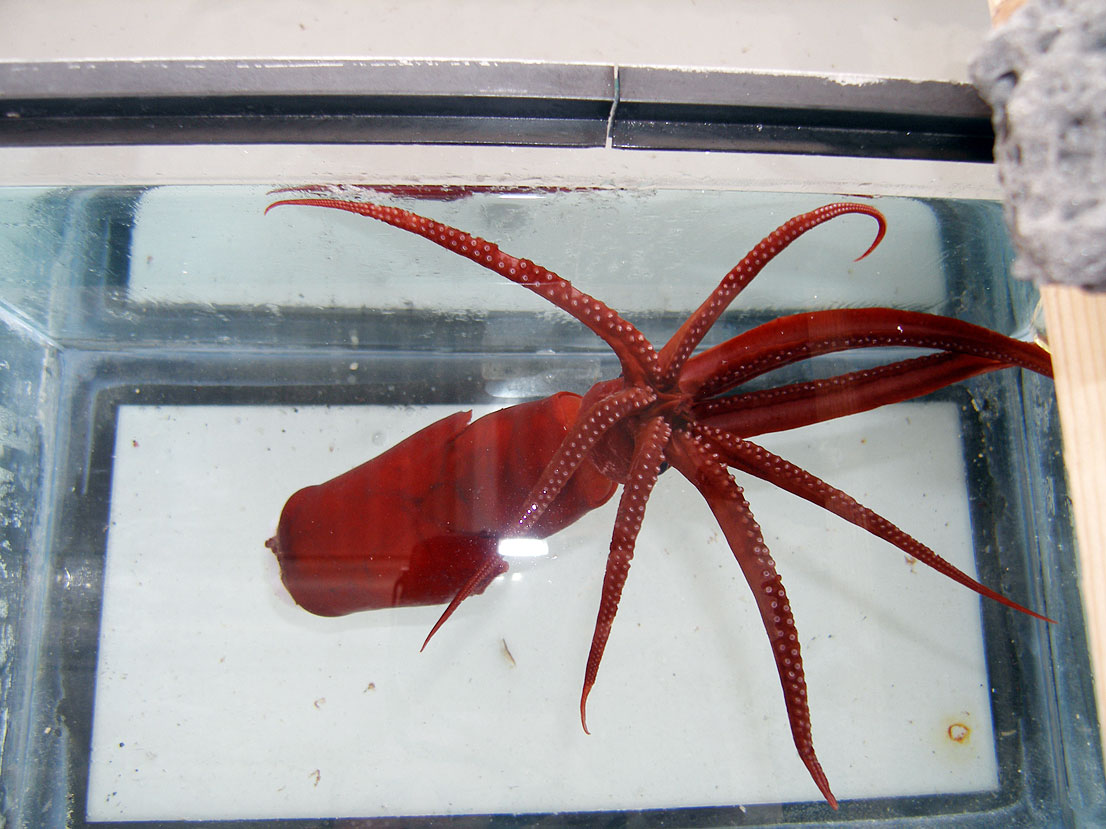

Conservation status
- Data Deficient (IUCN 3.1)

Scientific classification
- Kingdom: Animalia
- Phylum: Mollusca
- Class: Cephalopoda
- Order: Oegopsida
- Family: Mastigoteuthidae
- Genus: Magnoteuthis
- Species: M. microlucens

Binomial name
- Magnoteuthis microlucens (Young, Lindgren & Vecchione, 2008)

Synonyms
- Mastigoteuthis microlucens Young, Lindgren & Vecchione, 2008

= Magnoteuthis microlucens =

Species of squid

Magnoteuthis microlucens is a species of squid; the most common species of Mastigoteuthis around the main Hawaiian Islands.

A specimen was caught in a filter placed in one of the deep-sea pipelines of the Natural Energy Laboratory of Hawaii Authority (NELHA) off the Hawaiian Islands in the summer of 2007. On June 12, 2007, the creature was identified as an unnamed species of squid. The ruby-red creature was about a foot long, with white suction cups on its arms. The animal died three days after it was brought to the surface.

The specimen was originally dubbed "Octosquid" by NELHA operations manager Jan War, a reference to the fact that the specimen had only eight arms, like an octopus, rather than the eight arms and two tentacles of most squid. An examination of the specimen conducted by Richard Young of the University of Hawaii at Manoa, however, concluded that it was an unnamed species of the genus Mastigoteuthis. The specimen was likely missing its tentacles due to them being torn off during capture.

It was formally described in 2008 as Mastigoteuthis microlucens.
