= Mastigoteuthis psychrophila =

Conservation status
- Data Deficient (IUCN 3.1)

Scientific classification
- Kingdom: Animalia
- Phylum: Mollusca
- Class: Cephalopoda
- Order: Oegopsida
- Family: Mastigoteuthidae
- Genus: Mastigoteuthis
- Species: M. psychrophila

Binomial name
- Mastigoteuthis psychrophila Nesis, 1977

Species of mollusc

Mastigoteuthis psychrophila is a species of whip-lash squid. It was first described by Kir Nazimovich Nesis in 1977, based on four individuals found in Antarctic waters. The largest was 143 mm long. The squid's tentacles are 15 mm in diameter, with 0.15 mm diameter club suckers. Integumental photophores are present upon the head, arms and fins. Although uncertain, it is believed to have more than two series of photophores on the arms, differing from other species in the M. agassizii group. However, this species, like the rest of the family, is badly in need of revision.
