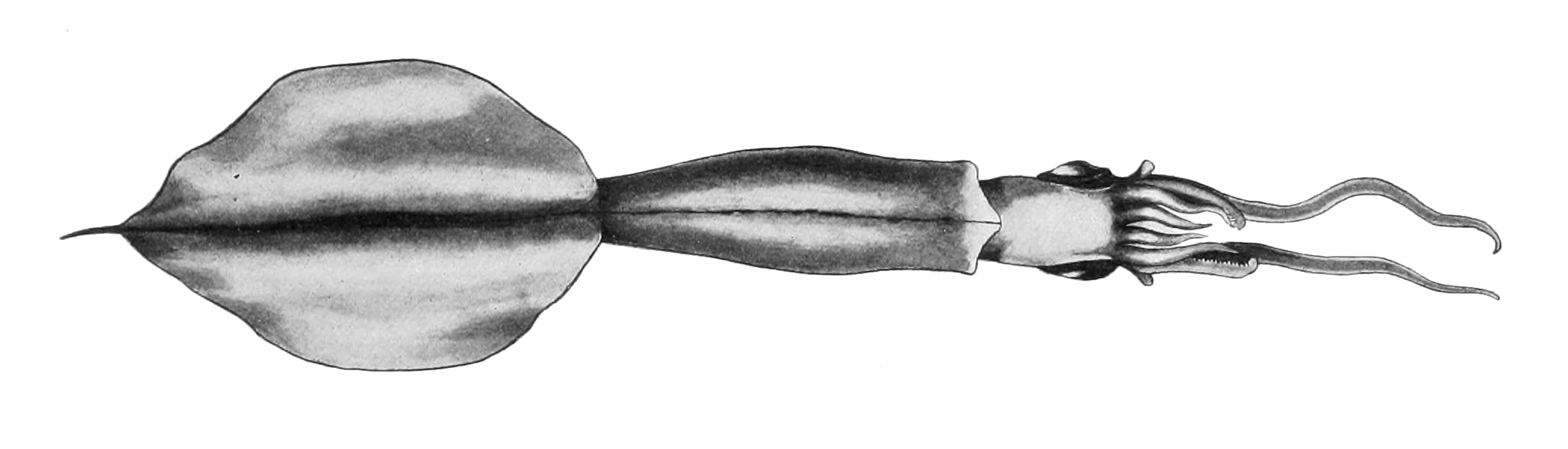
- Echinoteuthis famelica

Scientific classification
- Kingdom: Animalia
- Phylum: Mollusca
- Class: Cephalopoda
- Order: Oegopsida
- Family: Mastigoteuthidae
- Genus: Echinoteuthis; Joubin, 1933

Type species
- Echinoteuthis danae Joubin, 1933

= Echinoteuthis =

Genus of squids

Echinoteuthis is a genus of whip-lash squid is commonly known as the elusive beast squid due to its rarity and unique morphological features. This genus contains approximately three to five species. Some teuthologists consider Idioteuthis synonymous with this taxon. However, based on an integrative taxonomic analysis that involved morphology and genetics, species in this genus form a unique clade separate from species of Idioteuthis.

The genus contains bioluminescent species.

== Species ==
According to the World Register of Marine Species the genus Echinoteuthis contains three species:

- Echinoteuthis atlantica (Joubin, 1933)
- Echinoteuthis danae Joubin, 1933
- Echinoteuthis famelica (Berry, 1909)

However, the Tree of Life Project lists the following species in Echinoteuthis:

- Echinoteuthis atlantica (Joubin, 1933)
- Echinoteuthis glaukopis Chun, 1908
- Echinoteuthis famelica (Berry, 1909)
- Echinoteuthis danae Joubin, 1933
- Echinoteuthis tyroi * Salcedo-Vargas, 1997

The species listed above with an asterisk (*) is a taxon inquirendum and needs further study to determine if it is a valid species or a synonym.
