= Idioteuthis tyroi =

- Holotype of Idioteuthis tyroi (15 mm ML)

Scientific classification
- Domain: Eukaryota
- Kingdom: Animalia
- Phylum: Mollusca
- Class: Cephalopoda
- Order: Oegopsida
- Family: Mastigoteuthidae
- Genus: Idioteuthis
- Species: I. tyroi

Binomial name
- Idioteuthis tyroi Salcedo-Vargas, 1997

Species of squid

Idioteuthis tyroi is a species of whip-lash squid. It is known from a single paralarva of 15 mm mantle length (ML). The paralarva is unique in having expanded tentacular clubs, although few mastigoteuthids have described paralarvae.

Measurements of holotype (Salcedo-Vargas, 1997)
Mantle length	15 mm
Mantle width	3.5 mm
Head length	3.5 mm
Head width	2.5 mm
Fin length	8 mm
Fin width	12 mm
Arm I length	1.2 mm
Arm II length	1.8 mm
Arm III length	1.2 mm
Arm IV length	2.5 mm
Tentacle length	6 mm
Club length	3.5 mm
Eye diameter	1.3 mm
Lens diameter	0.8 mm
