= Echinoteuthis danae =

Conservation status
- Data Deficient (IUCN 3.1)

Scientific classification
- Kingdom: Animalia
- Phylum: Mollusca
- Class: Cephalopoda
- Order: Oegopsida
- Family: Mastigoteuthidae
- Genus: Echinoteuthis
- Species: E. danae

Binomial name
- Echinoteuthis danae Joubin, 1933

Synonyms
- Mastigoteuthis danae (Joubin, 1933); Idioteuthis danae (Joubin, 1933)

Species of mollusc

Echinoteuthis danae is a species of whip-lash squid. Known only from specimens of paralarvae, the species may be the juvenile form of Echinoteuthis atlantica.
