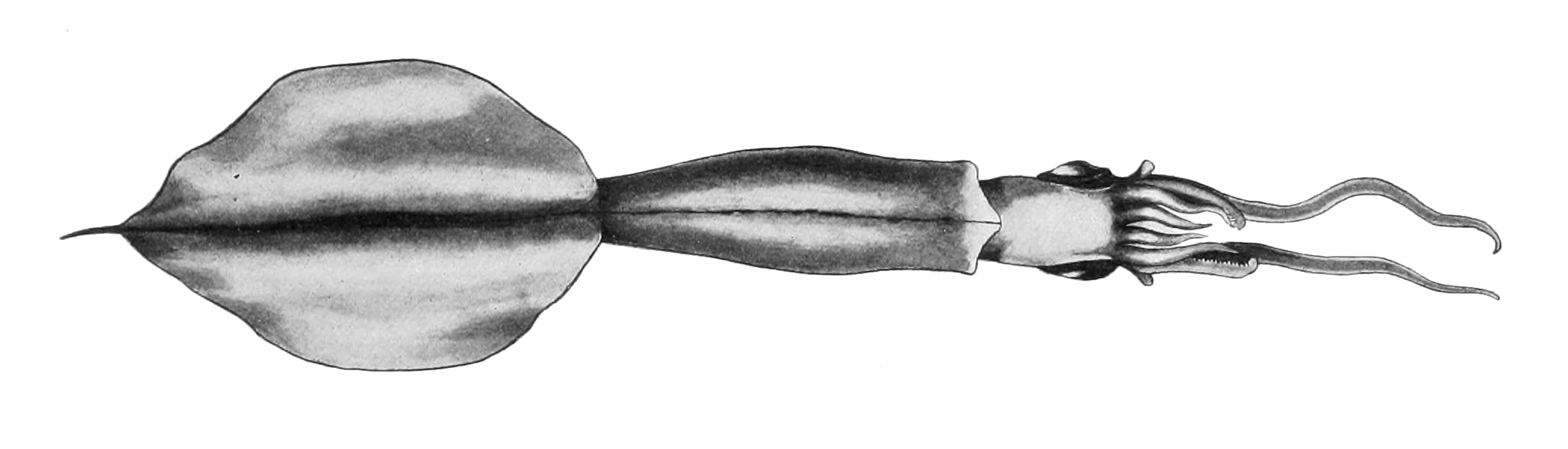

Scientific classification
- Domain: Eukaryota
- Kingdom: Animalia
- Phylum: Mollusca
- Class: Cephalopoda
- Order: Oegopsida
- Family: Mastigoteuthidae
- Genus: Idioteuthis
- Species: I. famelica

Binomial name
- Idioteuthis famelica (Berry, 1909)

Synonyms
- Chiroteuthis famelica Berry, 1909; Mastigoteuthis famelica (Berry, 1909)

= Idioteuthis famelica =

Species of squid

Idioteuthis famelica is a species of whip-lash squid.
