= Mastigoteuthis iselini =

Scientific classification
- Domain: Eukaryota
- Kingdom: Animalia
- Phylum: Mollusca
- Class: Cephalopoda
- Order: Oegopsida
- Family: Mastigoteuthidae
- Genus: Mastigoteuthis
- Species: M. iselini

Binomial name
- Mastigoteuthis iselini MacDonald & Clench, 1934

Species of mollusc

Mastigoteuthis iselini is a species of whip-lash squid. Some authors treat it as a junior synonym of Mastigoteuthis atlantica. It was first identified by R. MacDonald and William J. Clench in 1934 and presented to the Boston Society of Natural History. The type locality was identified as the northwestern Atlantic Ocean.
