= Idioteuthis latipinna =

Scientific classification
- Domain: Eukaryota
- Kingdom: Animalia
- Phylum: Mollusca
- Class: Cephalopoda
- Order: Oegopsida
- Family: Mastigoteuthidae
- Genus: Idioteuthis
- Species: I. latipinna

Binomial name
- Idioteuthis latipinna Sasaki, 1916

Synonyms
- Mastigoteuthis latipinna (Sasaki, 1916)

Species of mollusc

Idioteuthis latipinna is a species of whip-lash squid. It is the type species of the genus Idioteuthis. Richard E. Young and Michael Vecchione consider I. latipinna to be a junior synonym of I. cordiformis and the World Register of Marine Species states that it is a taxon inquirendum.

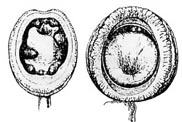
Oral view of arm suckers

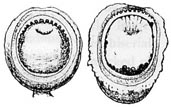
Oral view of tentacular club suckers
