= Idioteuthis hjorti =

Scientific classification
- Domain: Eukaryota
- Kingdom: Animalia
- Phylum: Mollusca
- Class: Cephalopoda
- Order: Oegopsida
- Family: Mastigoteuthidae
- Genus: Idioteuthis
- Species: I. hjorti

Binomial name
- Idioteuthis hjorti (Chun, 1913)

Synonyms
- Mastigoteuthis hjorti Chun, 1913

Species of squid

Idioteuthis hjorti is a species of whip-lash squid.
