= Magnapinna atlantica =

- Holotype of Magnapinna atlantica (59-millimetre or 2.3-inch ML)

Conservation status
- Data Deficient (IUCN 3.1)

Scientific classification
- Domain: Eukaryota
- Kingdom: Animalia
- Phylum: Mollusca
- Class: Cephalopoda
- Order: Oegopsida
- Family: Magnapinnidae
- Genus: Magnapinna
- Species: M. atlantica

Binomial name
- Magnapinna atlantica Vecchione & Young, 2006

Species of squid

Magnapinna atlantica, previously known as "Magnapinna sp. A", is a species of bigfin squid known from only two specimens collected in the northern Atlantic Ocean. It is characterised by several unique morphological features: the tentacle bases are narrower than adjacent arm bases, the proximal tentacle lacks suckers but possesses glandular structures, and the animal's pigment is contained mostly in functional chromatophores.

M. atlantica was described in 2006 by Michael Vecchione and Richard E. Young. The holotype, deposited in the National Museum of Natural History (cat. no. USNM 1086800), is an immature female of 59-millimetre (2.3 in) mantle length (ML), captured in the Gulf of Mexico on September 16, 1995 at 27°09′N 86°07′W. This specimen is relatively intact with damage only to the tips of the arms and tentacles. The paratype, held in the Natural History Museum (cat. no. BMNH 20060134), is an immature male of 53-millimetre (2.1 in) ML, captured over the Mid-Atlantic Ridge near the Azores on June 21, 1997 at 37°14′N 32°18′W.

== Bibliography ==
- Vecchione, M.; Young, R. E.; Guerra, A.; Lindsay, D. J.; Clague, D. A.; Bernhard, J. M.; Sager, W. W.; Gonzalez, A. F.; Rocha F. J. & Segonzac M. (2001). "Worldwide observations of remarkable deep-sea squids". Science 294: 2505-2506.
- Vecchione, M. & Young, R. E. (2006). "The squid family Magnapinnidae (Mollusca; Cephalopoda) in the North Atlantic with a description of Magnapinna atlantica, n. sp.". Proc. Biol. Soc. Wash. 119(3): 365-372.
