= Mastigoteuthis inermis =

Scientific classification
- Domain: Eukaryota
- Kingdom: Animalia
- Phylum: Mollusca
- Class: Cephalopoda
- Order: Oegopsida
- Family: Mastigoteuthidae
- Genus: Mastigoteuthis
- Species: M. inermis

Binomial name
- Mastigoteuthis inermis Rancurel, 1972

Species of mollusc

Mastigoteuthis inermis is a species of whip-lash squid. Richard E. Young and Michael Vecchione consider it to be a junior synonym of the widely distributed M. magna.
