= M. dentata =

M. dentata may refer to:

- Mastigoteuthis dentata, a squid species
- Melitara dentata, the North American cactus moth, a moth species native to western North America

== See also ==
- Dentata (disambiguation)
