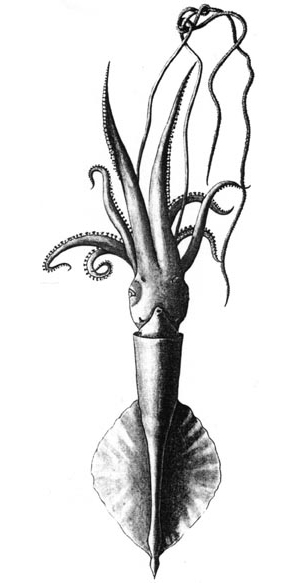
- Holotype of Mastigoteuthis atlantica (112 mm ML)

Conservation status
- Data Deficient (IUCN 3.1)

Scientific classification
- Kingdom: Animalia
- Phylum: Mollusca
- Class: Cephalopoda
- Order: Oegopsida
- Family: Mastigoteuthidae
- Genus: Echinoteuthis
- Species: E. atlantica

Binomial name
- Echinoteuthis atlantica Joubin, 1933

Synonyms
- Mastigoteuthis atlantica Joubin, 1933

= Echinoteuthis atlantica =

Species of mollusc

Echinoteuthis atlantica, commonly known as the elusive Atlantic beast squid, is a species of whip-lash squid from the family Mastigoteuthidae. It occurs in the eastern North and South Atlantic Ocean. This squid is red in colour and similar to Echinoteuthis famelica of the Pacific but differs in having a well developed protective membrane on the tentacular club which is absent on E. famelica. The presence on this membrane on Echinoteuthis glaukopis from the Indian Ocean suggests that this may be a synonym of E. atlantica, in which case glaukopis has priority.

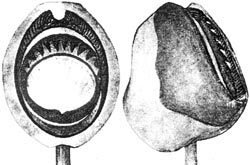
Oral and lateral views of arm suckers

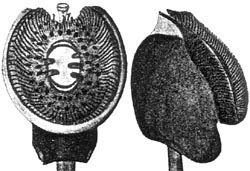
Oral and lateral views of club suckers

Eyelid photophore
