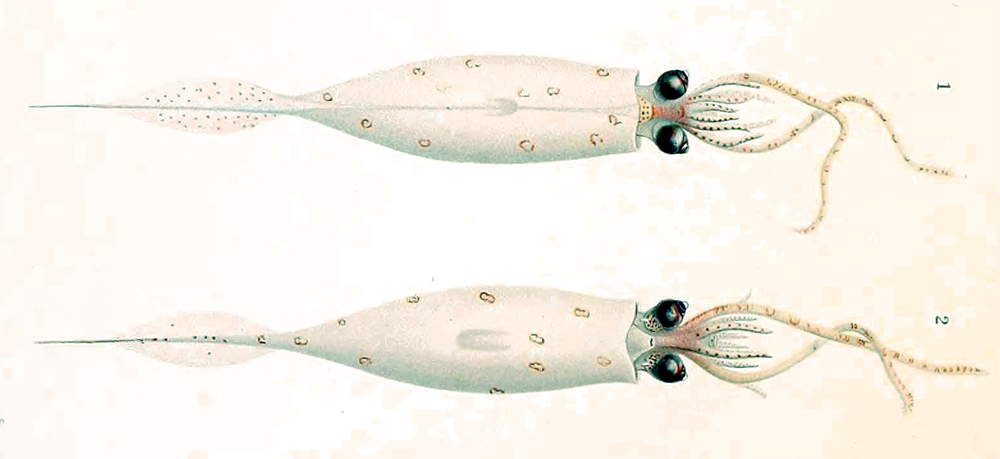

Conservation status
- Least Concern (IUCN 3.1)

Scientific classification
- Kingdom: Animalia
- Phylum: Mollusca
- Class: Cephalopoda
- Order: Oegopsida
- Family: Cranchiidae
- Genus: Galiteuthis
- Species: G. armata

Binomial name
- Galiteuthis armata Joubin, 1898

Synonyms
- Taonidium pfefferi Russell, 1909; Galiteuthis suhmi Chun, 1910

= Galiteuthis armata =

Armed cranch squid

Species of squid

Galiteuthis armata, the armed cranch squid, is a large species of glass squid. It reaches a mantle length of 61 cm (24 in). The species is native to the Atlantic Ocean and has been recorded from Bermuda, Canada, Namibia, and Spain. Armed cranch squids often appear to have bloated bodies, short arms, with thin but muscular mantles. They also contain large buoyancy chambers.
