= Henry the Hexapus =

Six-limbed octopus

Henry the Hexapus was a six-limbed lesser octopus found by British marine scientists in 2008. The name alludes to King Henry VIII, who had six wives. While the name Hexapus is descriptive, Henry the Hexapus should not be confused with Hexapus, a recognized genus of crabs.

The octopus was found off the coast of North Wales in a lobster pot, and was held in captivity at the Blackpool Sea Life Centre in North West England. His unusual number of arms was not immediately noticed, and appears to have resulted from a natal anomaly, rather than a physical accident. Developmental biologist PZ Myers called the defect "an ordinary sort of error." After being taken from the sea, Henry was transferred to the Anglesey Sea Zoo, which, in turn, donated him to the Blackpool Centre, where he was featured in an exhibition entitled "Suckers". An aquarium spokeswoman stated that "He's a lovely little thing."

Many other octopus arm anomalies have been recorded in the past. American tourists visiting Portugal also claimed to have captured images of a six-limbed octopus in the waters of Portinho Arrábida, although experts could not confirm the sighting without additional information. Labros Hydras, an American tourist, did capture a hexapus in Greece in 2013 as verified by photographs, but killed it by smashing it against a rock. He later ate it.
