= Funnel–mantle locking apparatus =

Structure found in many cephalopods

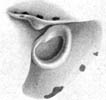
Funnel–mantle locking apparatus of a juvenile male Argonauta hians

The funnel–mantle locking apparatus is a structure found in many cephalopods that connects the mantle and hyponome (funnel) and restricts their movement relative to each other. It consists of two interlocking components: one located on the mantle (often fibrous) and the other on the funnel (often cartilaginous). The apparatus may permit some anterior–posterior displacement or prevent movement altogether.

== Variability ==
=== Funnel component ===
Six major forms of the funnel locking apparatus are recognised among teuthids (lazy-T shape, inverted-T shape, straight shape, triangular shape, oval with tragus and/or antitragus, and oval shape) and several more are found in the sepioids (including the boomerang shape and keyhole shape).

Shape of funnel locking apparatus	Species	Family
	Idioteuthis cordiformis	Mastigoteuthidae
	Magnapinna talismani	Magnapinnidae
	Mastigoteuthis flammea	Mastigoteuthidae
	Mastigoteuthis glaukopis	Mastigoteuthidae
	Mastigoteuthis grimaldii	Mastigoteuthidae
	Mastigoteuthis magna	Mastigoteuthidae

=== Mantle component ===
Shape of mantle locking apparatus	Species	Family
	Mastigoteuthis grimaldii	Mastigoteuthidae
