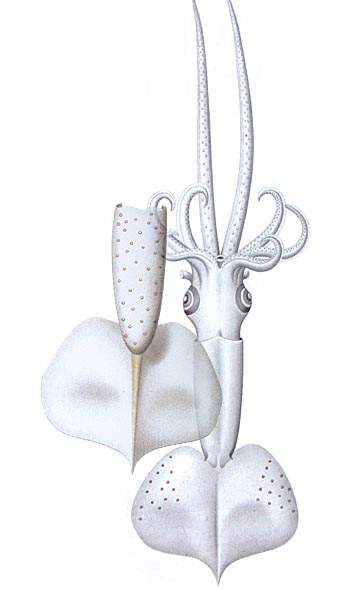
- Holotype of Mastigoteuthis grimaldii (ca. 38 mm ML)

Scientific classification
- Kingdom: Animalia
- Phylum: Mollusca
- Class: Cephalopoda
- Order: Oegopsida
- Family: Mastigoteuthidae
- Genus: Mastigoteuthis
- Species: M. grimaldii

Binomial name
- Mastigoteuthis grimaldii (Joubin, 1895)

Synonyms
- Chiroteuthis grimaldii Joubin, 1895

= Mastigoteuthis grimaldii =

Species of mollusc

Mastigoteuthis grimaldii is a species of whip-lash squid.

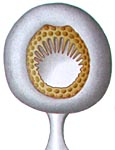
Oral view of a sucker from the middle region of the arm

Funnel component of funnel–mantle locking apparatus

Mantle component of funnel–mantle locking apparatus
