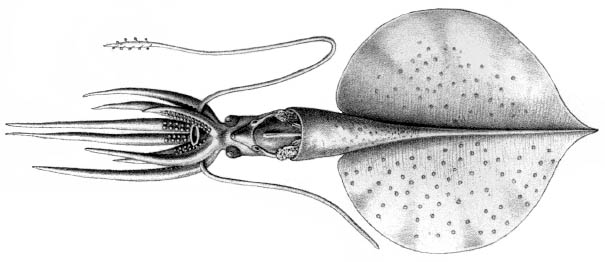
- Holotype of Magnapinna talismani (61-millimetre or 2.4-inch ML)

Scientific classification
- Kingdom: Animalia
- Phylum: Mollusca
- Class: Cephalopoda
- Order: Oegopsida
- Family: Magnapinnidae
- Genus: Magnapinna
- Species: M. talismani

Binomial name
- Magnapinna talismani (Fischer & Joubin, 1907)

Synonyms
- Chiroteuthopsis talismani Fischer & Joubin, 1907; Mastigoteuthis talismani (Fischer & Joubin, 1907)

= Magnapinna talismani =

Species of squid

Magnapinna talismani is a species of bigfin squid known only from a single damaged specimen. It is characterised by small white nodules present on the ventral surface of its fins.

It is the first described species of Magnapinna, although it was not recognized as a member of the genus until over a century later.

== Description ==
The holotype of M. talismani is a specimen of 61-millimetre (2.4 in) mantle length (ML) collected in the northern Atlantic Ocean, south of the Azores, at 34°46′N 36°11′W. It was caught by an open bottom trawl at a depth of up to 3,175 m (10,420 ft). The capture location of this specimen is very near to that of the as-yet undescribed Magnapinna sp. B.

== Taxonomy ==
M. talismani was originally placed in the genus Chiroteuthopsis, which is now considered a junior synonym of Mastigoteuthis. Mastigoteuthis talismani was subsequently placed in the genus Magnapinna by Michael Vecchione and Richard E. Young in 2006.

== Gallery ==
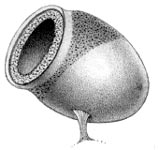
Arm sucker

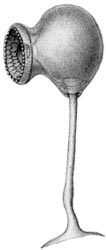
Tentacle sucker

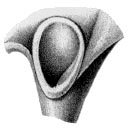
Frontal view of the funnel locking apparatus

== Bibliography ==
- Fischer, H. & Joubin, L. (1906). "Note sur les Céphalopodes capturés au cours des expéditions du Travailleur et du Talisman". Bulletin du Muséum National d'Histoire Naturelle. 12: 202-205, available online at http://biodiversitylibrary.org/page/5021383.
- Fischer, H. & Joubin, L. (1907). "Expéditions scientifiques du Travailleur et du Talisman". Céphalopodes 8: 313-353.
- Vecchione, M. & Young, R. E. (2006). "The squid family Magnapinnidae (Mollusca: Cephalopoda) in the AtlanticOcean, with a description of a new species", n. sp.. Proc. Biol. Soc. Wash. 119(3): 365-372.
