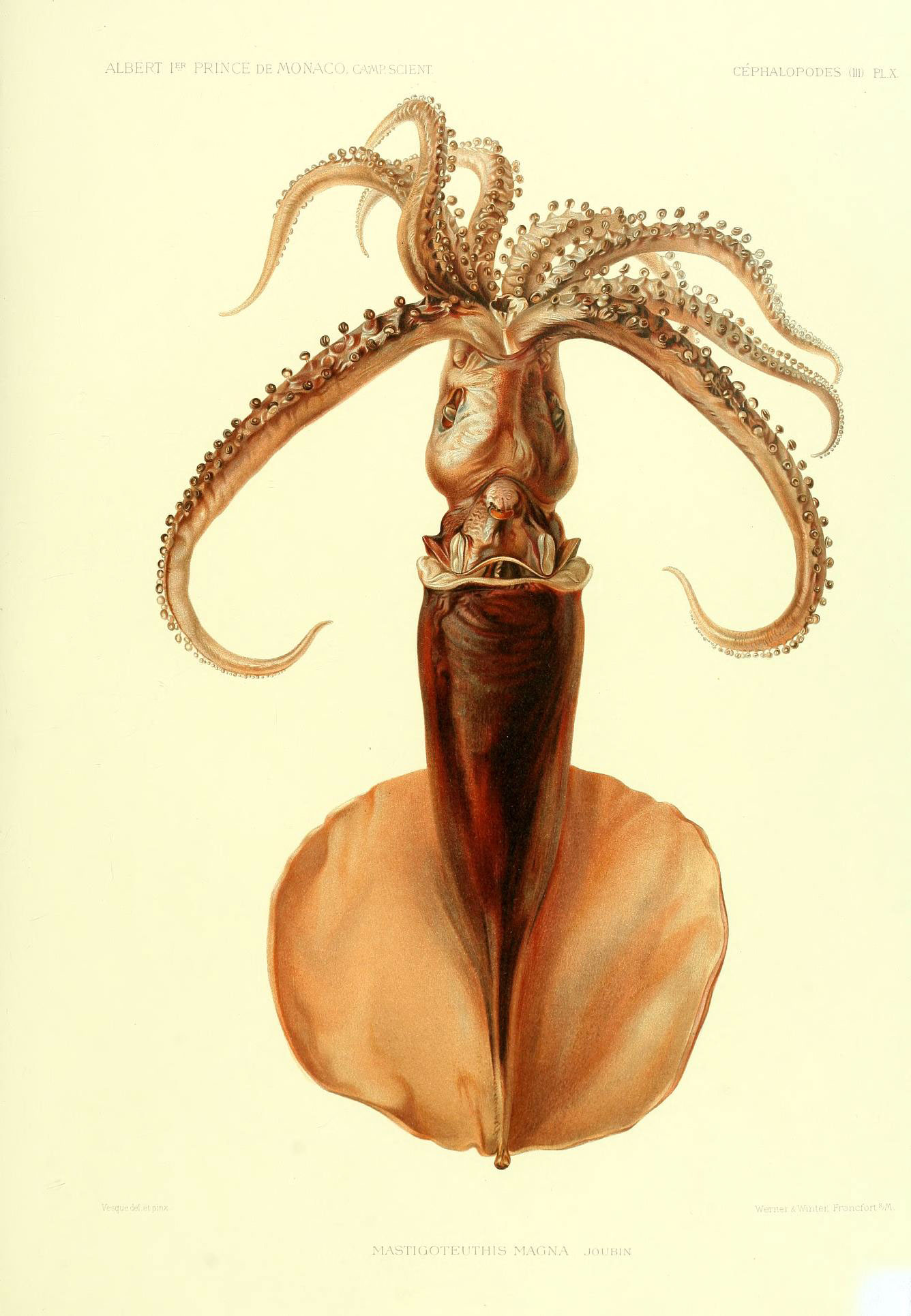
- Holotype of Mastigoteuthis magna (160 mm ML)

Scientific classification
- Kingdom: Animalia
- Phylum: Mollusca
- Class: Cephalopoda
- Order: Oegopsida
- Family: Mastigoteuthidae
- Genus: Mastigoteuthis
- Species: M. magna

Binomial name
- Mastigoteuthis magna Joubin, 1913

Synonyms
- Idioteuthis magna Joubin, 1913

= Mastigoteuthis magna =

Species of mollusc

Mastigoteuthis magna is a species of whip-lash squid, characterised by a lack of photophores. The skin is heavily pigmented a deep red by a numerous chromatophores.

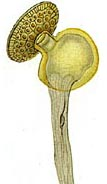
Side view of a club sucker

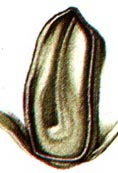
Funnel component of the funnel locking apparatus

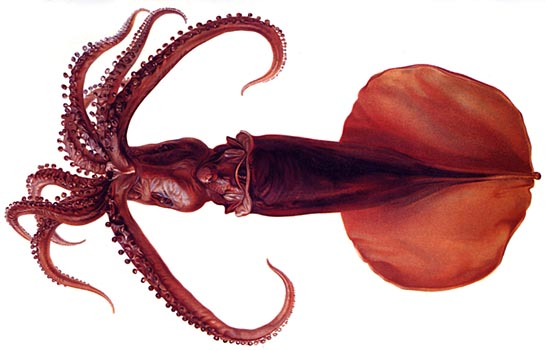
M. magna
