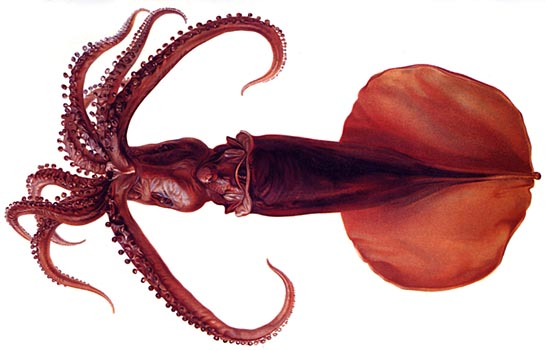

Conservation status
- Data Deficient (IUCN 3.1)

Scientific classification
- Kingdom: Animalia
- Phylum: Mollusca
- Class: Cephalopoda
- Order: Oegopsida
- Family: Mastigoteuthidae
- Genus: Magnoteuthis
- Species: M. magna

Binomial name
- Magnoteuthis magna (Joubin, 1913)

= Magnoteuthis magna =

Species of squid

Magnoteuthis magna is a species of squid in the genus Magnoteuthis. The species is widely distributed, and has been observed in the Gulf of Mexico, Indian Ocean, and off the coast of New Zealand. The species is commonly found in depths below 1,000 meters.
