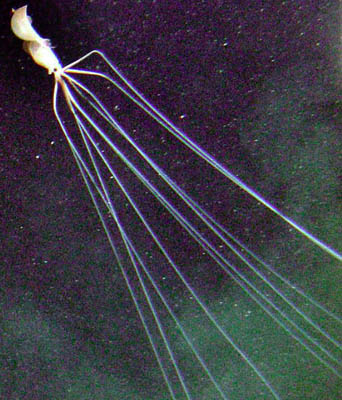
- A bigfin squid filmed in 2001, possibly an adult Magnapinna sp.

Scientific classification
- Kingdom: Animalia
- Phylum: Mollusca
- Class: Cephalopoda
- Order: Oegopsida
- Superfamily: Chiroteuthoidea
- Family: Magnapinnidae; Vecchione & Young, 1998
- Genus: Magnapinna; Vecchione & Young, 1998

Type species
- Magnapinna pacifica Vecchione & Young, 1998

Species
- Magnapinna atlantica Vecchione & Young, 2006; Magnapinna pacifica Vecchione & Young, 1998; Magnapinna talismani (Fischer & Joubin, 1907)

= Bigfin squid =

Genus (Magnapinna) of Cephalopoda

Bigfin squids are a group of rarely seen cephalopods found in deep-sea zones with a distinctive morphology. They are placed in the genus Magnapinna and family Magnapinnidae. Although the family was described only from larval, paralarval, and juvenile specimens, numerous video observations of much larger squid with similar morphology are assumed to be adult specimens of the same family.

The arms and tentacles of the squid are both extremely long, estimated at 4 to 8 m (13 to 26 ft). These appendages are held perpendicular to the body, creating "elbows". How the squid feeds is yet to be discovered.

Magnapinna is thought to be the deepest-occurring squid genus, with sightings as deep as 6,212 metres (20,381 ft) below the surface, making it the only squid known to inhabit the hadal zone.

== Taxonomy ==
Magnapinna is the sister group to Joubiniteuthis, another little-known deep-sea squid with an unusual body plan and long arms. Both Magnapinna and Joubiniteuthis are monotypic genera within their own families, Magnapinnidae and Joubiniteuthidae, respectively. They are also closely related to the "whip-lash squid" in the families Chiroteuthidae and Mastigoteuthidae.

== Physical specimens ==
The first record of this family comes from a specimen (Magnapinna talismani) caught off the Azores on 10 August 1883. Due to the damaged nature of the find, little information could be discerned, and it was classified as a mastigoteuthid, first as Chiroteuthopsis talismani and later as Mastigoteuthis talismani. In 1956, a similar squid (informally Magnapinna sp. C) was caught in the South Atlantic, but little was thought of it at the time. The specimen was illustrated in Alister Hardy's The Open Sea (1956), where it was identified as Octopodoteuthis sicula.

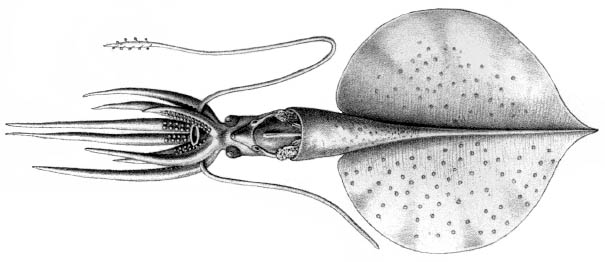
A juvenile Magnapinna talismani, the first known species from the family, with damaged arms

During the 1980s, two additional immature specimens were found in the Atlantic (Magnapinna sp. A), and three more were found in the Pacific (Magnapinna pacifica). Researchers Michael Vecchione and Richard Young were the chief investigators of the finds, and they eventually linked them to the two previous specimens, erecting the family Magnapinnidae in 1998, with Magnapinna pacifica as the type species. Of particular interest was the very large fin size, up to 90% of the mantle length, that was responsible for the animals' common name.

A single specimen of a purported fifth species, Magnapinna sp. B, was collected in 2006. Magnapinna sp. A was described as Magnapinna atlantica in 2006.

The genus was described from two juveniles and a paralarva, none of which had developed the characteristic long arm tips. However, they did all have large fins, so were named "magna pinna", meaning "big fin".

== Sightings ==
The presumed adult stage of Magnapinna is known only from video observations from submersibles, deep sea oil rig cameras, and remotely-operated vehicles (ROVs); no physical specimens have yet been collected, leaving their exact identity unknown. These individuals and the collected juvenile specimens share the large fins and the vermiform arm tips with no suckers, but the iconic elongated arm tips are known only from the presumed adult individuals. Although it has not been directly confirmed whether these squid are the same as the Magnapinna known from specimens, it is largely accepted that they are members of Magnapinnidae.

Although observations had been made over a decade earlier, adult bigfin squid only became known to science in 2001, when marine biology student Heather Holston sent footage of what she described as a "21-foot-long squid" to teuthologist Michael Vecchione. The footage had been recorded from an ROV in the Gulf of Mexico in January 2000 at the request of Holston's boyfriend Eric Leveton, who planned on showing it to her. Leveton was a structural engineer aboard the oil-drilling ship Millennium Explorer, who had happened to look into the ROV operation shack when the squid was observed by operators. Although Vecchione initially surmised from Holston's description that the footage might be the first video of a live giant squid (Architeuthis dux), he realized that the video itself portrayed a completely different squid that had no known identity.

My reaction was to jump out of my chair and start yelling profanities, because I knew it was something really different.

— Michael Vecchione, on the first sighting of an adult bigfin squid

Further discussions with other cephalopod researchers found no leads on the identity of the squid, and it was thus dubbed the "mystery squid" for a portion of time. Analysis by Vecchione et al of previous footage from submersibles found other video records of bigfin squid, the earliest from 1988. Around the same time, new high-quality footage of a bigfin squid was also recorded off Hawaii by the ROV Tiburon. In December 2001, Vecchione et al published a paper collating these observations; this was also the first paper to identify them as potential members of the Magnapinnidae, which had been named by Vecchione from the juvenile specimens a few years earlier. Independent of Vecchione's publication, Guerra et al published a paper the following year analyzing some of the early bigfin squid footage, and also identified them as potential adult magnapinnids.

=== Anatomy ===
The specimens in the videos looked very different from all previously known squids. Uniquely among cephalopods, the arms and tentacles were of the same length and looked identical (similar to extinct belemnites). The appendages were also held perpendicular to the body, creating the appearance of strange "elbows". Most remarkable was the length of the elastic tentacles, which has been estimated at up to 15–20 times the mantle length. This trait is caused by filament coiling of the tentacles, a trait that is rare among similar species. Estimates based on video evidence put the total length of the largest specimens at 8 m (25 ft) or more, with some estimates up to 12 m (40 ft). Viewing close-ups of the body and head, the fins appear to be extremely large, being proportionately nearly as big as those of bigfin squid larvae. While they do appear similar to the larvae, no specimens or samples of the adults have been taken. While their exact identity is unknown, all of the discovered specimens can be observed to have a beige-colored body, translucent fins, near-white tentacles, and dark eyes. These species of squids are mainly identifiable by their long, thin arms and specific colors. The squids also have a unique brachial crown that sets them aside from other known families.

=== Feeding behaviour ===
Little is known about the feeding behaviour of these squids. Scientists have speculated that bigfin squid feed by dragging their arms and tentacles along the seafloor and grabbing edible organisms from the floor. Alternatively, they may simply use a trapping technique, waiting passively for prey such as zooplankton to bump into their arms (see Cephalopod intelligence). The diet of the bigfin squid is unknown, but cephalopods are known to feed on crustaceans, jellyfish, and even other cephalopods.

=== Observation timeline ===
The first visual record of an adult bigfin squid was in September 1988. The crew of the submersible Nautile encountered a bigfin squid off the coast of northern Brazil, 10°42.91′N 40°53.43′W, at a depth of 4,735 m (15,535 ft). In July 1992, the Nautile again encountered these creatures, observing two individuals during a dive off the coast of Ghana at 3°40′N 2°30′W, first at 3,010 m (9,880 ft) depth and then again at 2,950 m (9,680 ft). Both were filmed and photographed. In November 1998, the Japanese crewed submersible Shinkai 6500 filmed another bigfin squid in the Indian Ocean south of Mauritius, at 32°45′S 57°13′E and 2,340 m (7,680 ft).

Eric Leveton's video, which was later shared with Vecchione, was taken from the remotely operated underwater vehicle (ROV) of the oil-drilling ship Millennium Explorer in January 2000, at Mississippi Canyon in the Gulf of Mexico (28°37′N 88°00′W) at 2,195 m (7,201 ft), and allowed for a size estimate. By comparison with the visible parts of the ROV, the squid was estimated to measure 7 m (23 ft) with arms fully extended. The Nautile filmed another Indian Ocean specimen at 19°32′S 65°52′E and 2,576 m (8,451 ft), in the area of Rodrigues Island, in May 2000. In October 2000, the crewed submersible Alvin found another bigfin squid at 1,940 metres (6,360 ft) in Atwater Valley, Gulf of Mexico (27°34.714′N 88°30.59′W).

These videos did not receive any media attention; most were brief and fairly blurry. In May 2001, about 10 minutes of crisp footage of a bigfin squid were acquired by ROV Tiburon, causing a flurry of attention when released. These were taken in the Pacific Ocean north of Oʻahu, Hawaii (21°54′N 158°12′W), at 3,380 metres (11,090 ft). This video and the pre-2001 videos (which had not previously received much scientific attention) were documented by Vecchione et al in a paper that year, and some of the earlier footage was further analyzed by Guerra et al (2002).

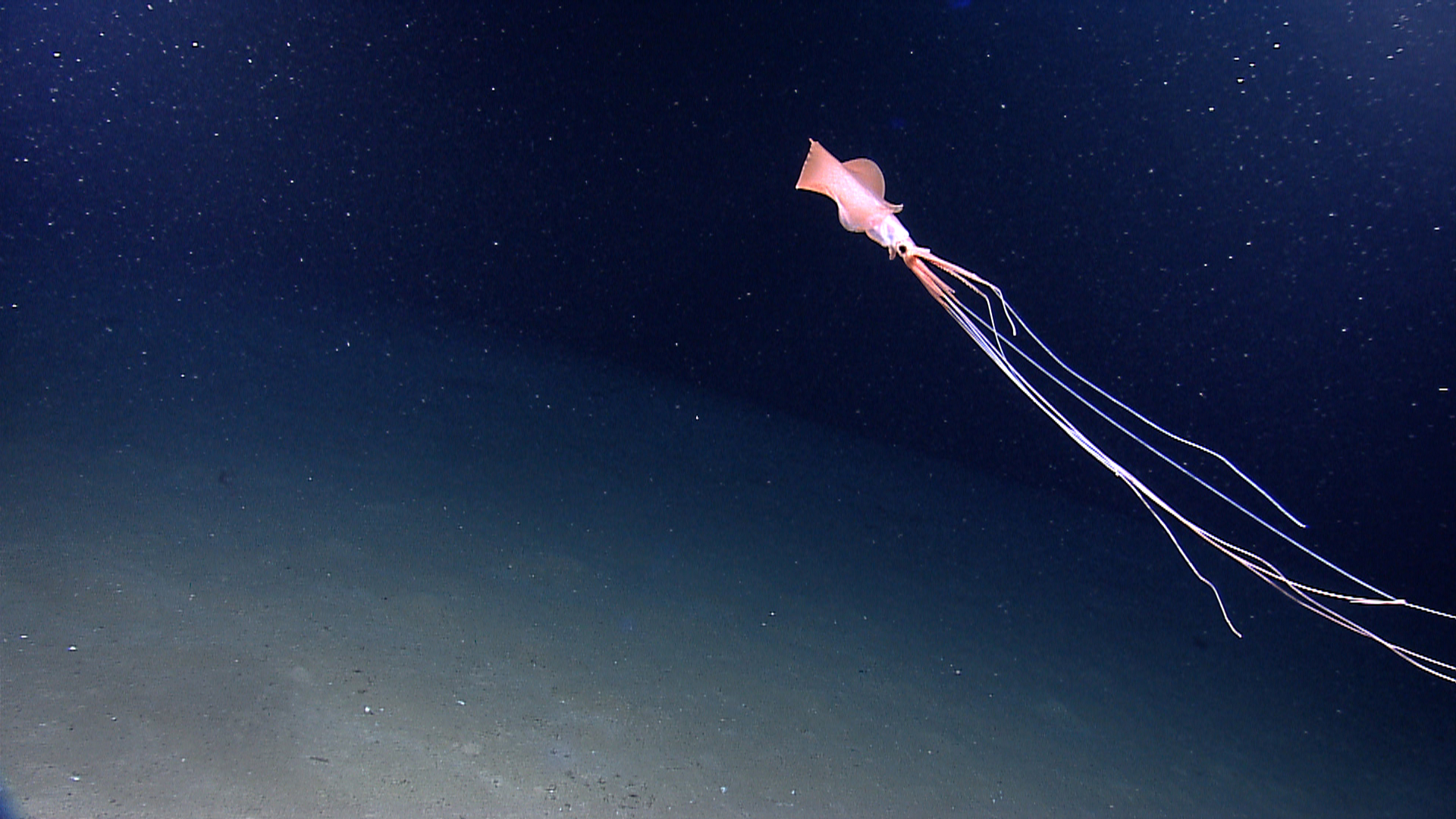
A bigfin squid filmed in the Gulf of Mexico in 2012

On 11 November 2007, a bigfin squid was filmed off Perdido, a drilling site owned by Shell Oil Company, located 200 statute miles or 320 km off Houston, Texas, in the Gulf of Mexico. The ROV that filmed the squid had originally been sent to retrieve drilling equipment from the seabed and encountered the squid floating near a well. After being circulated within the oil industry, the footage was shared with National Geographic News to have its identity determined, and it was released to the public in 2008. This video received significant online attention in the years since its filming.

Observations of bigfin squid were made in the Great Australian Bight during towed camera and ROV surveys in 2015 and 2017, respectively. In 2018, the first observations of a bigfin squid were made from the Southern Caribbean, off the coast of Colombia.

In March 2021, during the expedition to document the wreck of the USS Johnston, the submersible DSV Limiting Factor recorded footage of a juvenile bigfin squid from the Philippine Trench at a depth of 6,212 m (20,381 ft). This is the deepest observation of any squid and rivalled only by some unidentified cirrate octopods from the same habitat as the deepest observation of any cephalopod. This makes Magnapinna the first squid known to inhabit the hadal zone.

On 9 November 2021, a video of a bigfin squid was captured at a ridge feature off the West Florida Escarpment by an ROV from the NOAAS Okeanos Explorer as part of the Windows to the Deep 2021 expedition. The squid was found at a depth of 2,385 m (7,825 ft).

ROV SuBastian of Schmidt Ocean Institute observed a bigfin squid in close proximity to a black smoker-type hydrothermal vent on 4 April 2023, during the In Search of Hydrothermal Lost Cities expedition. The squid was seen at a depth of 1,931 m (6,335 ft).

On 18 October 2025, E/V Nautilus Corps of Exploration's remotely operated vehicle Little Hercules recorded a bigfin squid during the NA176 expedition that explored previously unsurveyed deep-sea habitats of the Cook Islands. The squid was recorded at a depth of 5,215 m (17,109 ft).

In July of 2026, E/V Nautilus Corps of Exploration's remotely operated vehicle Little Hercules captured a recording of a bigfin squid on the abyssal plain of northeastern Maug during the NA180 expedition that explored poorly known habitats in the US Exclusive Economic Zone around the Commonwealth of the Northern Mariana Islands. The squid was recorded at a depth of roughly 5,400 m (17,716 ft).

In August of 2026, E/V Nautilus Corps of Exploration's remotely operated vehicles Little Hercules and Atlanta observed two bigfin squid southwest of Lamotrek Island in Chuuk State during the NA180 expedition that explored poorly known habitats in the US Exclusive Economic Zone around the Commonwealth of the Northern Mariana Islands. The first bigfin squid sighting happened southwest of Lamotrek Island at a depth of 2,478 m (8,129 ft). The second bigfin squid encounter was recorded between Ifalik and Chuuk Islands at a depth of 2,700 m (8,858 ft). These two sightings occurred roughly 230 km from one another.

On 2 September 2026, researchers of Monterey Bay Aquarium Research Institute (MBARI) studying the ecology of seamounts offshore of central California aboard the research vessel David Packard encountered a bigfin squid with their remotely operated vehicle Doc Ricketts. The squid was observed at a depth of 3,277 m (10,751 ft).

== See also ==
- Cephalopod – Class of mollusks
- Cephalopod size – Body variation
- Deep-sea community – Groups of organisms living deep below the sea surface, sharing a habitat
