= Galiteuthis pacifica =

Conservation status
- Least Concern (IUCN 3.1)

Scientific classification
- Kingdom: Animalia
- Phylum: Mollusca
- Class: Cephalopoda
- Order: Oegopsida
- Family: Cranchiidae
- Genus: Galiteuthis
- Species: G. pacifica

Binomial name
- Galiteuthis pacifica (Robson, 1948)

Synonyms
- Taonidium pacificum Robson, 1948

Species of squid

Galiteuthis pacifica is a little known species of glass squid from the family Cranchiidae. It has never been fully described, despite having a wide distribution in the tropical Indo-Pacific. The males grow to at least 33 cm (13 in) in mantle length.
