= Magnoteuthis osheai =

Scientific classification
- Kingdom: Animalia
- Phylum: Mollusca
- Class: Cephalopoda
- Order: Oegopsida
- Family: Mastigoteuthidae
- Genus: Magnoteuthis
- Species: M. osheai

Binomial name
- Magnoteuthis osheai (Braid & Bolstad, 2015)

Species of squid

Magnoteuthis osheai is a species of squid in the genus Magnoteuthis. The species has been observed off the coast of New Zealand.
