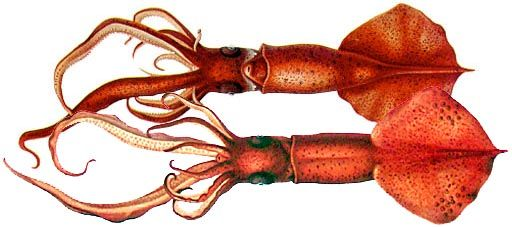
- Type of Mastigoteuthis flammea (35 mm ML)

Scientific classification
- Kingdom: Animalia
- Phylum: Mollusca
- Class: Cephalopoda
- Order: Oegopsida
- Family: Mastigoteuthidae
- Genus: Mastigoteuthis
- Species: M. flammea

Binomial name
- Mastigoteuthis flammea Chun, 1908

= Mastigoteuthis flammea =

Species of mollusc

Mastigoteuthis flammea (Flaming whiplash squid) is a species of whip-lash squid.

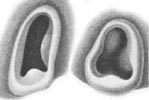
Ventral views of funnel locking apparatuses (left: 27 mm ML, right: 35 mm ML)

Dorsal view of nuchal cartilage
