= Mastigoteuthis schmidti =

Scientific classification
- Domain: Eukaryota
- Kingdom: Animalia
- Phylum: Mollusca
- Class: Cephalopoda
- Order: Oegopsida
- Family: Mastigoteuthidae
- Genus: Mastigoteuthis
- Species: M. schmidti

Binomial name
- Mastigoteuthis schmidti Degner, 1925

Species of mollusc

Mastigoteuthis schmidti is a species of whip-lash squid.

Measurements and counts of holotype (Degner, 1925)
Mantle length	46 mm
Mantle width	16 mm
Fin length	30 mm
Fin width	37 mm
Arm I length	18 mm
Arm II length	27 mm
Arm III length	28 mm
Arm IV length	56 mm
Arm I sucker no.	62
Arm II sucker no.	80
Arm III sucker no.	76-80
Arm IV sucker no.	80-84
Tentacle length	135 mm
Club length	86 mm
