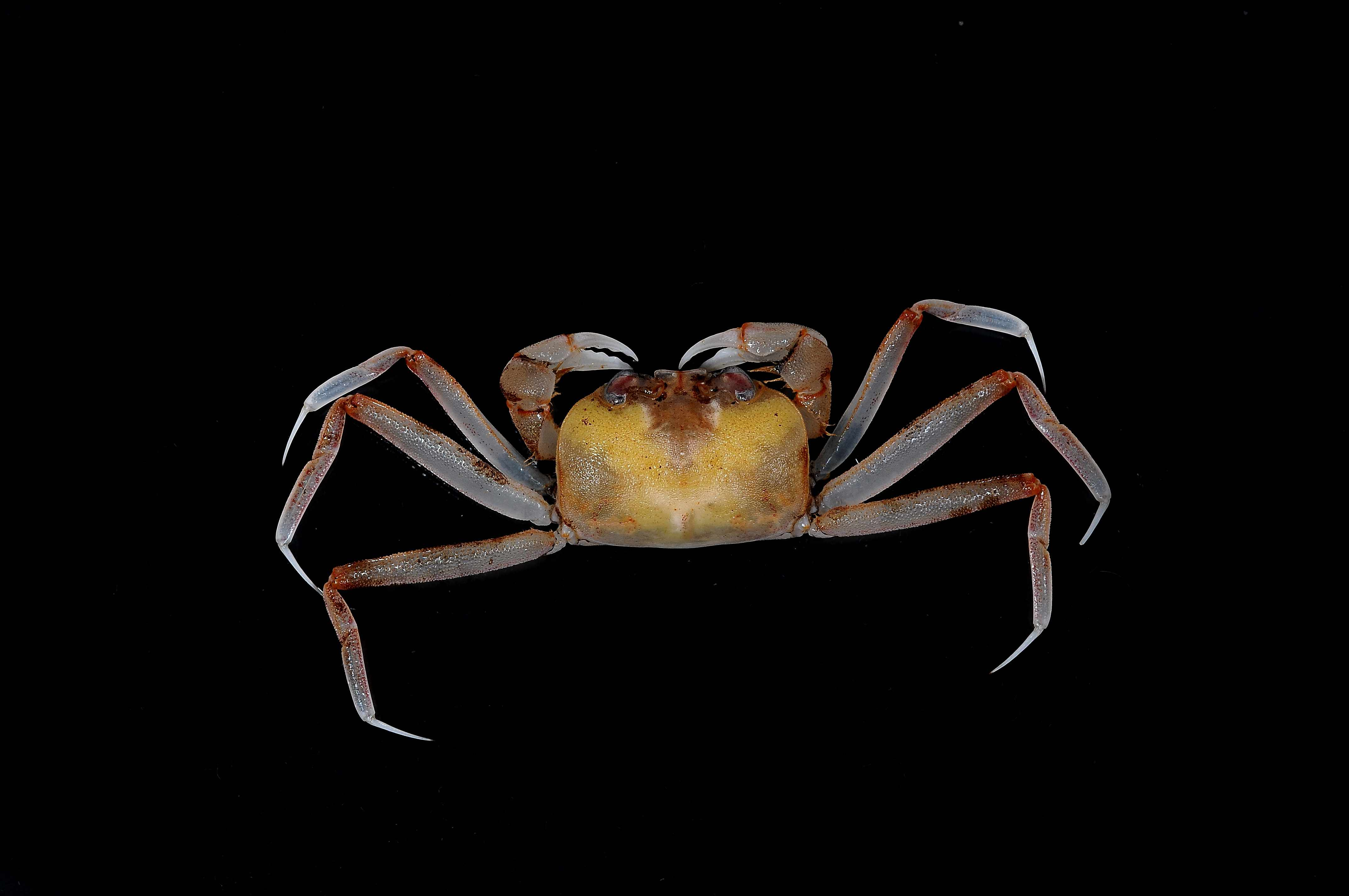

Scientific classification
- Kingdom: Animalia
- Phylum: Arthropoda
- Clade: Pancrustacea
- Class: Malacostraca
- Order: Decapoda
- Suborder: Pleocyemata
- Infraorder: Brachyura
- Subsection: Heterotremata
- Superfamily: Hexapodoidea; Miers, 1886
- Family: Hexapodidae; Miers, 1886

Type genus
- Hexapus De Haan, 1833

Genera
- See text

= Hexapodidae =

Hexapodidae Temporal range: Paleocene–Recent

Family of crabs

Hexapodidae is a family of crabs, the only family in the superfamily Hexapodoidea. It has traditionally been treated as a subfamily of the family Goneplacidae, and was originally described as a subfamily of Pinnotheridae. Its members can be distinguished from all other true crabs by the reduction of the thorax, such that only seven sternites are exposed, and only four pairs of pereiopods are present. Not counting the enlarged pair of claws, this leaves only six walking legs, from which the type genus Hexapus, and therefore the whole family, takes its name. Some anomuran "crabs", such as porcelain crabs and king crabs also have only four visible pairs of legs. With the exception of Stevea williamsi, from Mexico, all the extant members are found either in the Indo-Pacific oceans, or around the coast of Africa.

== Fossil record ==
In addition to the extant taxa, the family contains two genera known only from fossils – Goniocypoda and Palaeopinnixa – and two further genera include both living and fossil representatives: Hexapus and Stevea. The family's fossil record extents back certainly as far as the Paleocene, with unverified reports of a species in the Maastrichtian of Senegal.

== Genera ==
The following are the genera included under Hexapodidae:

Genera marked with † are extinct

- †Bellhexapus De Angeli, Guinot, & Garassino, 2010
- †Eohexapus De Angeli, Guinot, & Garassino, 2010
- †Eurohexapus De Angeli, Guinot, & Garassino, 2010
- †Globihexapus Schweitzer & Feldmann, 2001
- †Goniocypoda Woodward, 1867
- Hexalaughlia Guinot, 2006
- Hexapinus Manning & Holthuis, 1981
- Hexaplax Doflein, 1904
- Hexapus De Haan, 1833
- Mariaplax Rahayu & Ng, 2014
- Lambdophallus Alcock, 1900
- Latohexapus Huang, Hsueh, & Ng, 2002
- Paeduma Rathbun, 1897
- †Palaeopinnixa Via, 1966
- Parahexapus Balss, 1922
- Pseudohexapus Monod, 1956
- Rayapinus Rahayu & Ng, 2014
- Spiroplax Manning & Holthuis, 1981
- Stevea Manning & Holthuis, 1981
- Thaumastoplax Miers, 1881
- Theoxapus Rahayu & Ng, 2014
- Tritoplax Manning & Holthuis, 1981
