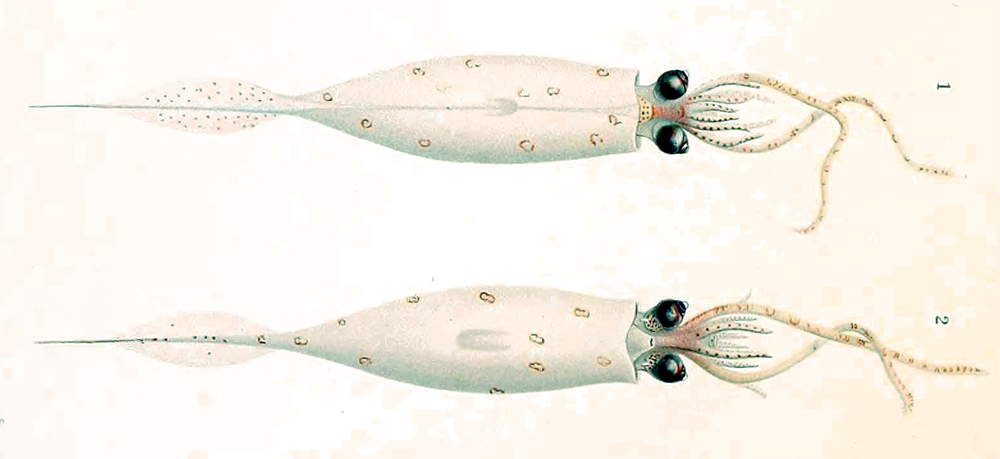

Scientific classification
- Kingdom: Animalia
- Phylum: Mollusca
- Class: Cephalopoda
- Order: Oegopsida
- Family: Cranchiidae
- Genus: Galiteuthis
- Species: G. suhmi

Binomial name
- Galiteuthis suhmi (Hoyle, 1886)

Synonyms
- Taonius suhmi Hoyle, 1886

= Galiteuthis suhmi =

Species of squid

Galiteuthis suhmi is a very rarely recorded species of mesopelagic to bathypelagic glass squid from the family Cranchiidae which has a circumglobal range in the subtropical to sub-Antarctic seas. It has a maximum recorded mantle length of 300–400 mm (12–16 in).
