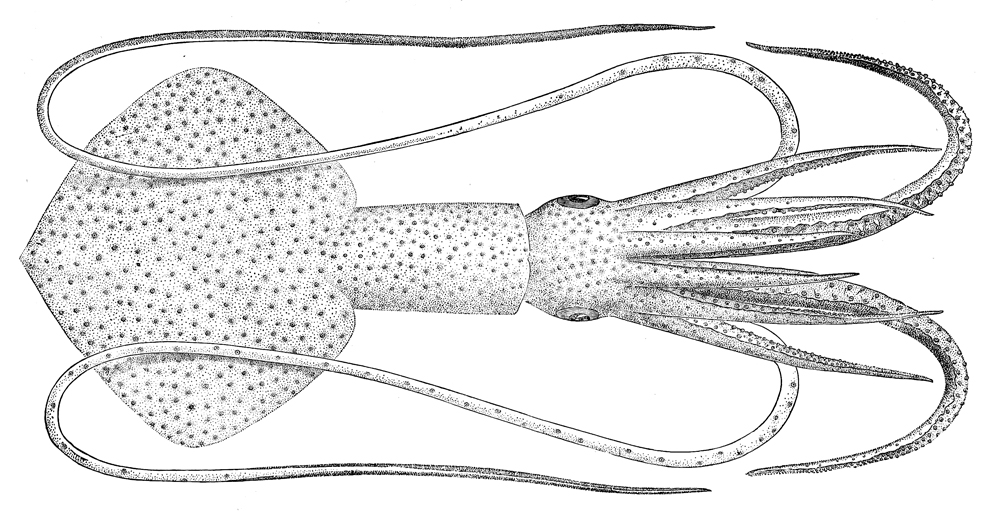
- Dorsal view

Conservation status
- Data Deficient (IUCN 3.1)

Scientific classification
- Kingdom: Animalia
- Phylum: Mollusca
- Class: Cephalopoda
- Order: Oegopsida
- Family: Mastigoteuthidae
- Genus: Mastigoteuthis
- Species: M. agassizii

Binomial name
- Mastigoteuthis agassizii Verrill, 1881

= Mastigoteuthis agassizii =

Species of mollusc

Mastigoteuthis agassizii is a species of whip-lash squid. It is the type species of the genus.

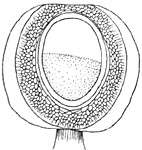
Oral view of a sucker from the middle of a lateral arm

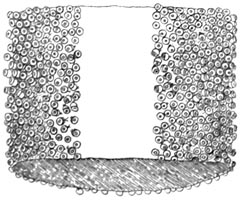
Aboral view of a portion of the tentacular club

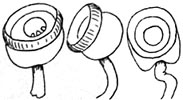
Various views of club suckers

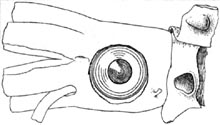
Head and funnel with funnel locking apparatus
