= Echinoteuthis famelica =

Conservation status
- Data Deficient (IUCN 3.1)

Scientific classification
- Kingdom: Animalia
- Phylum: Mollusca
- Class: Cephalopoda
- Order: Oegopsida
- Family: Mastigoteuthidae
- Genus: Echinoteuthis
- Species: E. famelica

Binomial name
- Echinoteuthis famelica (Berry, 1909)

Species of mollusc

Echinoteuthis famelica is a species of whip-lash squid. They are found off the coasts of New Zealand.
