= Hexapus =

Hexapus Temporal range: Lutetian–Recent

Scientific classification
- Domain: Eukaryota
- Kingdom: Animalia
- Phylum: Arthropoda
- Class: Malacostraca
- Order: Decapoda
- Suborder: Pleocyemata
- Infraorder: Brachyura
- Family: Hexapodidae
- Genus: Hexapus; De Haan, 1833

Type species
- Cancer sexpes Fabricius, 1798

Species
- See text

Genus of crabs

Hexapus is a genus of crabs in the family Hexapodidae. It contains only three extant species found in the Indo-West Pacific. They inhabit the intertidal and subtidal areas of shorelines.

== Description ==
Like other members of the family, these crabs are easily recognizable due to the complete absence of the last pair of walking legs (pereiopods). They thus only have six walking legs (excluding the claws), unlike the usual eight. Their carapace is subquadrate, wider than it is long, with a rounded anterior.

== Species ==
The following are the species classified under Hexapus.

Species marked with † are extinct

=== Extant species ===
- Hexapus bidentatus Velip & Rivonker, 2014

Found in Goa, India

- Hexapus sexpes (Fabricius, 1798)

Found from Cochin, southwest India to Phuket, Thailand and the Penang Strait of Malaysia

- Hexapus timika Rahayu & Ng, 2014

Found in Timika, Papua, Indonesia

=== Fossil species ===
- †Hexapus decapoda (Morris & Collins, 1991)

Originally described as Prepaeduma decapoda. From Sarawak, Borneo, Malaysia (Miri Formation, Pliocene)

- †Hexapus granuliformis Karasawa & Kato, 2008

From Bolbe, Davao City, Philippines (Mandug Formation, early Pleistocene)

- †Hexapus nakajimai Imaizumi, 1959

From the Jōban Coal Field of Iwaki, Fukushima, Japan (Nakayama Formation, Miocene)

- †Hexapus pinfoldi Collins & Morris, 1978

From the Khyber Pakhtunkhwa of Pakistan (Kirthar Formation, Lutetian)

=== Excluded species ===
Hexapus estuarinus is now regarded as a junior synonym of Hexapus sexpes. In addition, the following the species has been transferred to other genera:

- Hexapus anfractus (Rathbun, 1909) - Originally described as Lambdophallus anfractus, now accepted as Mariaplax anfracta
- Hexapus buchanani Monod, 1956 - Now accepted as Theoxapus buchanani
- Hexapus edwardsii Serène & Soh, 1976 - Now accepted as Hexapinus edwardsii
- Hexapus granuliferus Campbell & Stephenson, 1970 - Now accepted as Mariaplax granuliferus
- Hexapus latipes De Haan, 1835 - Now accepted as Hexapinus latipes
- Hexapus stebbingi Barnard, 1947 - Now accepted as Tritoplax stebbingi
- Hexapus stephenseni Serène & Soh, 1976 - Now accepted as Mariaplax stephenseni
- Hexapus williamsi Glassell, 1938 - Now accepted as Stevea williamsi
