= Mastigoteuthis dentata =

Conservation status
- Data Deficient (IUCN 3.1)

Scientific classification
- Kingdom: Animalia
- Phylum: Mollusca
- Class: Cephalopoda
- Order: Oegopsida
- Family: Mastigoteuthidae
- Genus: Mastigoteuthis
- Species: M. dentata

Binomial name
- Mastigoteuthis dentata Hoyle, 1904

Species of mollusc

Mastigoteuthis dentata is a species of whip-lash squid.

Oral view of an arm IV sucker

Oral view of proximal segment of the outer ring of an arm IV sucker
