= Mastigoteuthis =

Scientific classification
- Domain: Eukaryota
- Kingdom: Animalia
- Phylum: Mollusca
- Class: Cephalopoda
- Order: Oegopsida
- Family: Mastigoteuthidae
- Genus: Mastigoteuthis; Verrill, 1881

Type species
- Mastigoteuthis agassizii Verrill, 1881

Species
- See text.

Synonyms
- Chiroteuthopsis Pfeffer, 1900

Genus of molluscs

Mastigoteuthis is a genus of whip-lash squid containing at least seven valid species. Some teuthologists consider Idioteuthis synonymous with this taxon.

The genus contains bioluminescent species.

== Species ==
- Genus Mastigoteuthis
  - Mastigoteuthis agassizii Verrill, 1881
  - Mastigoteuthis dentata Hoyle, 1904
  - Mastigoteuthis flammea Chun, 1908
  - Mastigoteuthis glaukopis Chun, 1908
  - Mastigoteuthis grimaldii (Joubin, 1895)
  - Mastigoteuthis psychrophila Nesis, 1977
  - Mastigoteuthis schmidti Degner, 1925
  - Mastigoteuthis hastula * (Berry, 1920)
  - Mastigoteuthis inermis * Rancurel, 1972
  - Mastigoteuthis iselini * MacDonald & Clench, 1934
  - Mastigoteuthis okutanii * Salcedo-Vargas, 1997
  - Mastigoteuthis tyroi * Salcedo-Vargas, 1997

Magnapinna talismani was previously placed in this genus, but is now considered a species of bigfin squid.

The taxa listed above with an asterisk (*) are taxon inquirendum and need further study to determine if they are a valid taxon or a synonym.
