= RV Western Flyer =

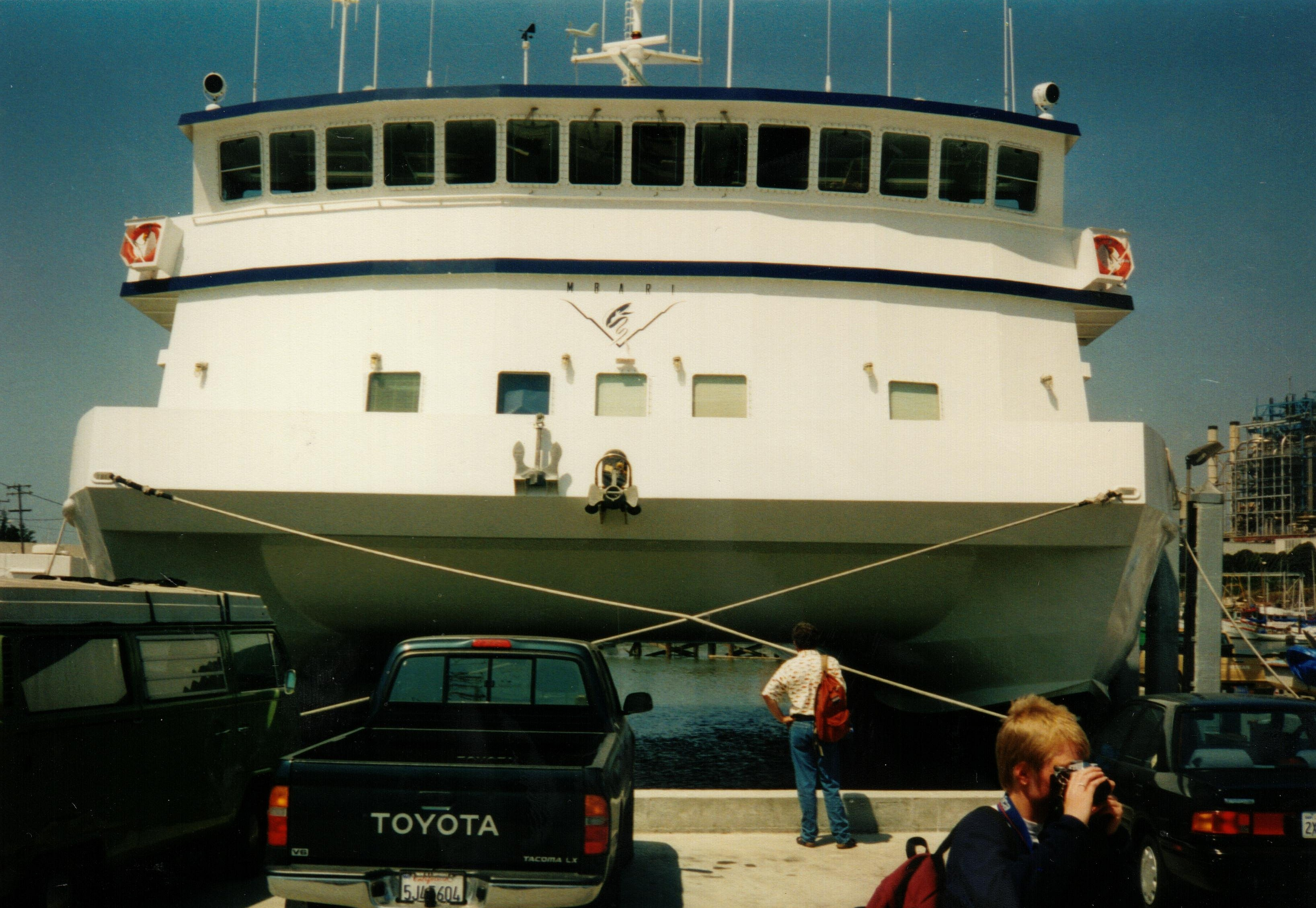
- RV Western Flyer in Moss Landing

History
- Operator: Florida Institute of Oceanography
- Identification: IMO number: 8990902; MMSI number: 367766000; Callsign: WDD2611
- Status: Active

General characteristics
- Type: Research vessel
- Tonnage: 498 GT 230 NT (US); 847 GT 254 NT (ITC)
- Displacement: 419 LT
- Length: 117 ft 3 5/8 in (35.754 m)
- Beam: 53 ft (16 m) (moulded)
- Draft: 12 ft (3.7 m)
- Installed power: Generators (5): 2 × Caterpillar 3512 850 kW (1,140 hp); 2 × Caterpillar 3408, 350 kW (470 hp); 1 × Caterpillar 3306B 195 kW (261 hp)
- Propulsion: 2 × 1,250 hp (930 kW) GE propulsion motors
- Speed: 14.5 knots (26.9 km/h; 16.7 mph)
- Range: 4,000 nmi (7,400 km; 4,600 mi) at 8 knots (15 km/h; 9.2 mph)
- Crew: 10 crew, 16 Science Party/ROV Controllers
- Fuel Capacity: 22,000 US gal (83,000 L; 18,000 imp gal)
- Potable Water: 2,400 US gal (9,100 L; 2,000 imp gal)
- Clean L.O. Capacity: 700 US gal (2,600 L; 580 imp gal)
- Dirty L.O. Capacity: 700 US gal (2,600 L; 580 imp gal)
- Ballast Capacity: 19,530 US gal (73,900 L; 16,260 imp gal)
- Gray Water: 300 US gal (1,100 L; 250 imp gal)
- Black Water: 280 US gal (1,100 L; 230 imp gal)

RV Western Flyer is a twin hulled SWATH research vessel operated by the Florida Institute of Oceanography (FIO). In November 2022, the R/V Western Flyer was acquired by the Florida Institute of Oceanography and its Host Institution, the University of South Florida. The custom-designed ship was granted to FIO by the Monterey Bay Aquarium Research Institute (MBARI) for use as a sailing classroom and platform for FIO’s new ROV and peer mentoring program, providing new opportunities for students who dream of a career in Ocean STEAM.

Its relatively stable SWATH design permits expanded operational capability in rough sea states. It is the platform of operations for the ROV Taurus. The vessel carries 10 crew and 16 science party/ROV operators, for a total complement of 26. Cruises generally occur on the Florida coastlines in the Gulf of Mexico, with the capability for excursions further afield to the Caribbean and Atlantic. The vessel is purposed for the Peerside Program that focuses on engaging students who typically don’t have access to sea-going platforms. The technologically advanced vessel is increasing access to marine science through at-sea experiences and remote science.

== Vessel description/ design characteristics ==
=== General arrangement ===
Accommodations are provided for 26 crew members and scientists in 14 staterooms located on the upper deck. The crew complement is ten for all voyages and the combination of ROV staff and scientists (16) brings the total vessel complement to 26.

=== Equipment and control/monitoring systems ===
The main machinery plant is diesel-electric with a common power bus connecting five generators. Any combination of generator operations will provide power for both propulsion and other vessel operations. This design arrangement provides a high level of machinery plant redundancy and operational flexibility. Propulsion power is transmitted through two duplicate drive trains, each consisting of a DC electric motor and fixed pitch propeller. Silicon-controlled rectifiers (SCRs) are used to convert generated AC power to DC propulsive power. Two electric motor-driven bow thrusters are installed to enhance maneuvering and station-keeping.

=== Primary equipment and control/monitoring systems ===
- Four SCR drives: GE, Model DC2000
- Fuel centrifuge: Alfa Laval, Model MAB 103
- Marine sanitation device: Orca, Model 11A-36
- Air compressor: Quincy, Model QR 25
- One water-maker: Sea Recovery model SCR5M3-SW-H
- Cathodic protection/monitor: Swath Ocean Systems, Inc.
- Uninterruptible power supply: Exide Pwr Wave +18, J1842AU131EE00A
- Monitoring system: Exide Pwr Wave +18, J1842AU131EE00A
- Generator control: Point 8
- Propulsion control: Nautronix/GE/Omnithruster
- Bow thruster control: Omnithruster B2000
- Ballast system control: Swath Ocean Systems, Inc.

=== Primary navigation and communication equipment ===
- GPS: Leica MX420, Furuno SC120
- Radar: Furuno, Models FR2110 & FR1941
- Gyro compass: Sperry FOG Furuno SC120
- Dynamic positioning: Nautronix, Model ASK 4001
- Autopilot: Maritime Dynamics Inc, Nautronix ASK 4001.
- Motion Control: Maritime Dynamics Inc.
- Steering system: Swath Ocean Systems, Inc. / Maritime Dynamics
- GMDSS station: Furuno model RC5000 3T, areas A1-A3
- Depth sounder: Knudsen 3208/R (good to 5000m)
- PBX system: Knudsen 3208/R (good to 5000m)
- Weather station: Barometer, wind indicator, Furuno FW-200
- Computing station: Chart and Navigation
- Dopler: Furuno CI-80 current indicator

=== Primary fire fighting and safety equipment ===
- Fire detection and alarm system: Cerebus Pyrotronics MXL
- SOLAS Rescue Boat: Ribcraft 5.85m with 75 Honda outboard motor
- Life rafts: Two 25-man Viking
- Extinguishing systems: Portable & fixed - (7) Fire Hose Stations
- EPIRB:
  - Two 9Ghz SARTs
  - One 406Mhz w/121.5 MHz beacon

=== Primary deck machinery ===
- Cranes:
  - One – Model HIAB 290
  - One – Modified Allied
- CTD winch system: Dynacon 12030
  - Capacity: 6500 m of .322 in. cable
  - Max. continuous line pull:
    - Bare drum – 7000 lbs.@100 fpm
    - Full drum – 4300 lbs.@140 fpm
  - Max. continuous line speed:
    - Bare drum – 240 fpm @ 2500 lbs.
    - Full drum – 415 fpm @ 1450 lbs.
- Anchor windlass: Kolstrand Akphaw 223324
- Mooring winches: Four – Marco WG023
- ROV umbilical handling system: Dynacon TV3615K/SW3616K
- Stern "A-Frame": 13,000 lbs. SWL;
  - 14 ft wide, 13 ft clearance through entire range of motion

== History ==
R/V Western Flyer was designed and built by SWATH Ocean Systems in 1996 for Monterey Bay Aquarium Research Institute (MBARI). The vessel was named after the famous fishing vessel Western Flyer, which was chartered by John Steinbeck and Ed Ricketts in 1940 and included in the books The Sea of Cortez (1941) and The Log from the Sea of Cortez (1951). MBARI operated the R/V Western Flyer for 25 years and the vessel contributed to more than 500 research cruises and identified over 200 species.
