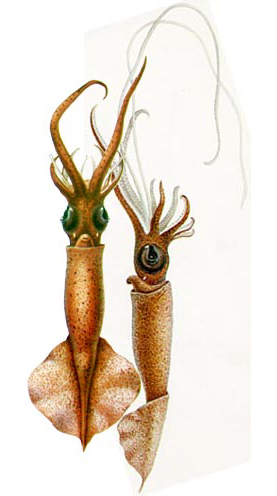
- Holotype of Mastigoteuthis glaukopis (37 mm ML)

Conservation status
- Data Deficient (IUCN 3.1)

Scientific classification
- Kingdom: Animalia
- Phylum: Mollusca
- Class: Cephalopoda
- Order: Oegopsida
- Family: Mastigoteuthidae
- Genus: Mastigoteuthis
- Species: M. glaukopis

Binomial name
- Mastigoteuthis glaukopis Chun, 1908

Synonyms
- Echinoteuthis glaukopis (Chun, 1908)

= Mastigoteuthis glaukopis =

Species of mollusc

Mastigoteuthis glaukopis is a species of whip-lash squid.

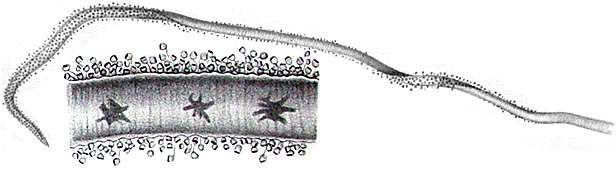
View of the twisted tentacular club with an enlargement

Ventral view of funnel locking apparatus
