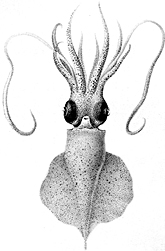
- Holotype of Idioteuthis cordiformis (83 mm ML)

Conservation status
- Data Deficient (IUCN 3.1)

Scientific classification
- Domain: Eukaryota
- Kingdom: Animalia
- Phylum: Mollusca
- Class: Cephalopoda
- Order: Oegopsida
- Family: Mastigoteuthidae
- Genus: Idioteuthis
- Species: I. cordiformis

Binomial name
- Idioteuthis cordiformis (Chun, 1908)

Synonyms
- Mastigoteuthis cordiformis Chun, 1908

= Idioteuthis cordiformis =

Species of mollusc

Idioteuthis cordiformis is a species of whip-lash squid found in tropical regions of the west Pacific Ocean. The species is commonly known as the 'love-heart squid' because the species name cordiformis is Latin for 'heart shaped'. Recently, this species has been found to consume small birdbeak dogfish.

== Description ==
Idioteuthis cordiformis is a large, deep-sea species that attains a mantle length (body length) of over one meter in length. Although multiple specimens have been carefully observed, they are often damaged during capture. Therefore, different authorities have described variations in the colouration of this species: pale flesh-pink, yellowish with small reddish-brown chromatophores, dark purple pigmentation with purple chromatophores overlaid with greyish tubercles, or having thickly crowded deep brownish chromatophores. In life, these animals appear dark red or purple Like all squids, it has eight arms. Like other species in this family, it also has two long, whip-like tentacles. The tentacles of this species are unique in this family in that they contain some large suckers, while other mastigoteuthids have small to microscopic suckers. The largest tentacle suckers of I. cordiformis are nearly the same size as the arm suckers, but the size diminishes towards the very ends of the tentacles and the suckers become very small

The skin is rough and covered with small, conical tubercules on round plaques. The dark red or purple pigment is found in densely packed chromatophores but there are no photophores present on the skin. However, each eye has a large crescent shaped photophore. The head is separated from the mantle by a collar. The funnel is widely conical with a recurved end. The funnel attaches to the mantle with a locking apparatus. The funnel component has the form of a human ear, while the mantle component is shaped like a human nose. Like most squids, the eyes are large and highly developed, with relatively large lobes of the brain dedicated to their control. The posterior end of the mantle has a heart-shaped fin, which extends three quarters of the way along the mantle.

== Distribution ==
Idioteuthis cordiformis is found in tropical waters around Australia, New Zealand, Indonesia, Japan and the Philippines.

== Gallery ==
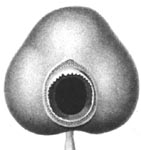
Arm sucker

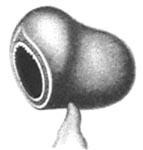
Arm sucker

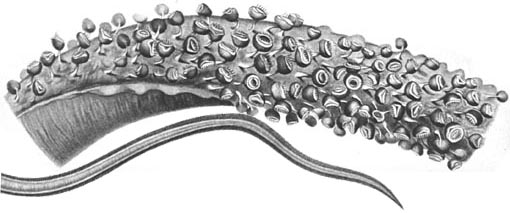
Oral (top) and aboral (bottom) views of tentacular club

Oral-oblique view of club sucker

Lateral view of club sucker

Ventral view of funnel locking apparatus

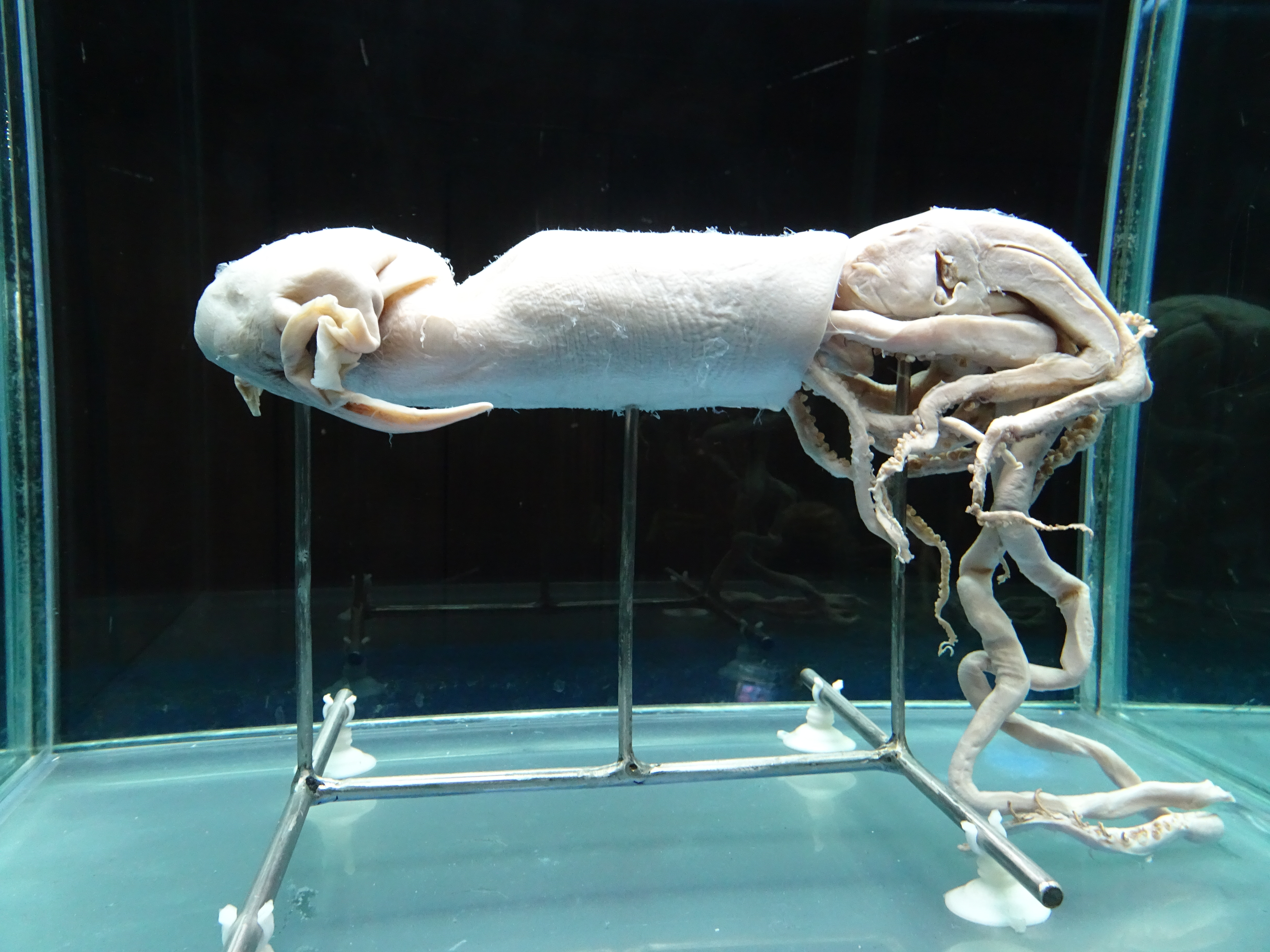
Idioteuthis cordiformis in a museum
