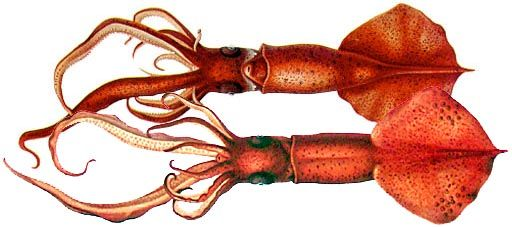
- Mastigoteuthis flammea

Scientific classification
- Kingdom: Animalia
- Phylum: Mollusca
- Class: Cephalopoda
- Order: Oegopsida
- Superfamily: Chiroteuthoidea
- Family: Mastigoteuthidae; Verrill, 1881

Genera
- Echinoteuthis Joubin, 1933; Idioteuthis Sasaki, 1916; Magnoteuthis Salcedo-Vargas & Okutani, 1994; Mastigopsis Grimpe, 1922; Mastigoteuthis Verrill, 1881; Mastigotragus Young, Michael Vecchione & Braid, 2014

= Whip-lash squid =

Family of cephalopods

The Mastigoteuthidae, also known as whip-lash squid, are a family of small deep-sea squid. Approximately 20 known species in six genera are represented, with members found in both the mesopelagic and bathypelagic zone of most oceans. Originally described by Verill in 1881, it was later lowered by Chun (1920) to a subfamily (Mastigoteuthinae) of the Chiroteuthidae. However, Roper et al. (1969) raised it back to the family level, and this has not been changed since. The taxonomy of this family is extremely unstable, and there have been at times one genus, two genera and four subgenera(Salcedo-Vargas & Okutani, 1994), two genera and several 'groups' (Salcedo-Vargas, 1997), five genera and one species with an uncertain placement, or six genera.

== Description ==
Mastigoteuthids range in size from quite small species in the genus Mastigoteuthis, to relatively gigantic sizes in the genus Idioteuthis. However most are rather small, from 3–15 centimetres total mantle length. Their most distinctive features are their extremely elongate tentacles—which retract into membranous lateral sheaths of the fourth (and largest) arms—and their very large ovate fins, which may occupy up to 80% of the mantle length in some species. It is from these 'whip-like' tentacles that their common name derives. Unlike most other squid, the club of the mastigoteuthid tentacle is not significantly (usually not at all) broader than the rest of the tentacle and is covered in very small suckers—in some species, invisible to the naked eye—which impart an extremely sticky property to the clubs, themselves answering for 70% or more of the tentacle's length in some species.

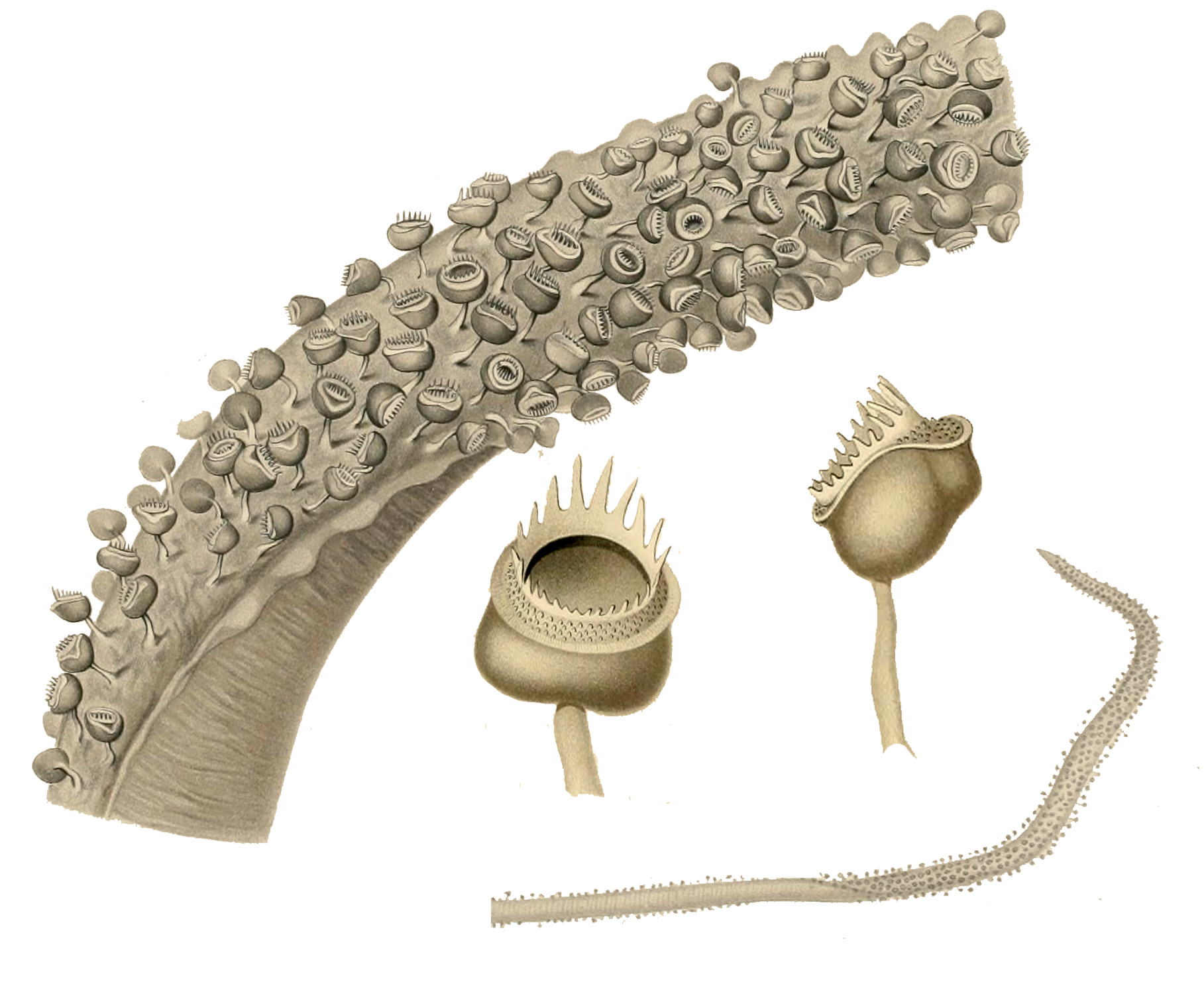
Detail of suckers

Many species also possess photophores (bioluminescent organs) which may be located on either the skin, the surface of the eyeball, or the eyelid. These photophores have a "lens" of chromatophores, pigment cells which may allow the squid to modify the colour of the light produced by the photophores. The mantle of some species is adorned with conical or hemispherical tubercles. Most species have arm suckers that possess sharp or blunt conical teeth, which are either larger or present only on the distal side, however some species, such as Mastigoteuthis inermis, have smooth sucker rings with no teeth at all (however, the validity of this species is uncertain at the present time). Coloration is typically a rich reddish brown or dark purple.

Species in the genus Echinoteuthis and Idioteuthis are known to have expanded tentacular clubs as paralarvae (for both species) or adults (Idioteuthis).

== Behaviour ==
Members of this family have scarcely been observed in life, but at least two species (Mastigopsis hjorti and Magnoteuthis magna) are known to hover above the ocean bottom in a vertical orientation, the head pointing downward. The squid use their large fins to maintain this orientation and use both their extended tentacles like fly paper, held rigidly at a constant distance apart: this has been termed the "tuning fork" position. Prey items apparently consist primarily of benthic crustaceans.

Although mastigoteuthids possess ink sacs (which could suggest forays into shallower, lit waters), all observations have been over the bottom in deep water. Deep-sea squids commonly possess ink. The squid seem to lack the ability of rapid jet propulsion and instead rely on their large fins.

== Species ==
This family is taxonomically little understood, but there have many recent advances in its systematics. With many species represented by single, damaged, and juvenile specimens, this group is still creating controversy in the taxonomic community. Salcedo-Vargas and Okutani (1994) reclassified the family and eliminated the genus Echinoteuthis, added two subgenera, and reduced the number of species to eight. Three years later, after the careful examination of skin tubercles and photophores, Salcedo-Vargas eliminated his subgenera, and increased the number of species to 17 (Salcedo-Vargas, 1997).

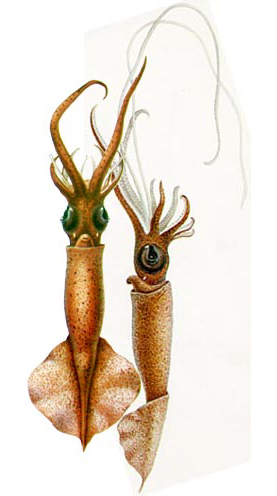
Mastigoteuthis glaukopis

According to the World Register of Marine Species the classification of the Mastigoteuthidae is:

- Genus Echinoteuthis Joubin, 1933
  - Echinoteuthis atlantica (Joubin, 1933)
  - Echinoteuthis danae Joubin, 1933
  - Echinoteuthis famelica (Berry, 1909)
- Genus Idioteuthis Sasaki, 1916
  - Idioteuthis latipinna * Sasaki, 1916
  - Idioteuthis cordiformis (Chun, 1908)
- Genus Magnoteuthis Salcedo-Vargas & Okutani, 1994
  - Magnoteuthis magna (Joubin, 1913)
  - Magnoteuthis microlucens (Young, Lindgren & Vecchione, 2008)
  - Magnoteuthis osheai Braid & Bolstad, 2015
- Genus Mastigopsis Grimpe, 1922
  - Mastigopsis hjorti (Chun, 1913)
- Genus Mastigoteuthis
  - Mastigoteuthis agassizii Verrill, 1881
  - Mastigoteuthis dentata Hoyle, 1904
  - Mastigoteuthis flammea Chun, 1908
  - Mastigoteuthis glaukopis Chun, 1908
  - Mastigoteuthis grimaldii (Joubin, 1895)
  - Mastigoteuthis psychrophila Nesis, 1977
  - Mastigoteuthis schmidti Degner, 1925
  - Mastigoteuthis hastula * (Berry, 1920)
  - Mastigoteuthis inermis * Rancurel, 1972
  - Mastigoteuthis iselini * MacDonald & Clench, 1934
  - Mastigoteuthis latipinna * (Sasaki, 1916)
  - Mastigoteuthis okutanii * Salcedo-Vargas, 1997
  - Mastigoteuthis tyroi * Salcedo-Vargas, 1997
- Genus Mastigotragus
  - Mastigotragus pyrodes (Young, 1972)

The taxa listed above with an asterisk (*) are taxon inquirendum and needs further study to determine if it is a valid taxon or a synonym.

The validity of several species remains to be reviewed, and the placement of the species Mastigotragus pyrodes in a separate genus should be assessed with genetics.
