= Michael Vecchione =

American zoologist

- Education: University of Miami
- Alma mater: College of William and Mary
- Known for: Elected Fellow of the American Association for the Advancement of Science
- Scientific career
- Fields: Zoology
- Institutions: Smithsonian National Museum of Natural History

Michael Vecchione is an American zoologist currently at the Smithsonian National Museum of Natural History and an Elected Fellow of the American Association for the Advancement of Science since 2001. His highest cited paper is Common and scientific names of aquatic invertebrates from the United States and Canada: Mollusks at 661 times, according to Google Scholar. His current interests are marine biodiversity and cephalopods. He described the Magnapinnidae family in 1998 along with Richard Young.

== Education ==
He earned his B.S. at University of Miami in 1972 and his Ph.D. at College of William and Mary in 1979.

== Publications ==
- Deep, diverse and definitely different: unique attributes of the world's largest ecosystem, 9, Biogeosciences, 2010
- The evolution of coleoid cephalopods and their present biodiversity and ecology, RE Young, M Vecchione, DT Donovan, 20, African Journal of Marine Science 1998
- Octopus, Squid, and Cuttlefish: A Visual Scientific Guide to the Oceans' Most Advanced Invertebrates, Roger Hanlon, Mike Vecchione, Louise Allcock, University of Chicago Press, 2018
