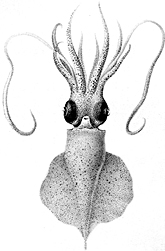
- Idioteuthis cordiformis

Scientific classification
- Domain: Eukaryota
- Kingdom: Animalia
- Phylum: Mollusca
- Class: Cephalopoda
- Order: Oegopsida
- Family: Mastigoteuthidae
- Genus: Idioteuthis; Sasaki, 1916

= Idioteuthis =

Genus of molluscs

Idioteuthis is a genus of whip-lash squid containing at least one species. Some teuthologists consider it synonymous with Mastigoteuthis, but genetics have confirmed the placement of this genus as distinct from all other genera in this family. The placement of Idioteuthis within the Mastigoteuthidae remains uncertain.

== Species ==
- Genus Idioteuthis
  - Idioteuthis cordiformis (Chun, 1908)
  - Idioteuthis latipinna * Sasaki, 1916

The taxon listed above with an asterisk (*) is a taxon inquirendum and needs further study to determine if it is a valid taxon or a synonym.
