= Louis Joubin =

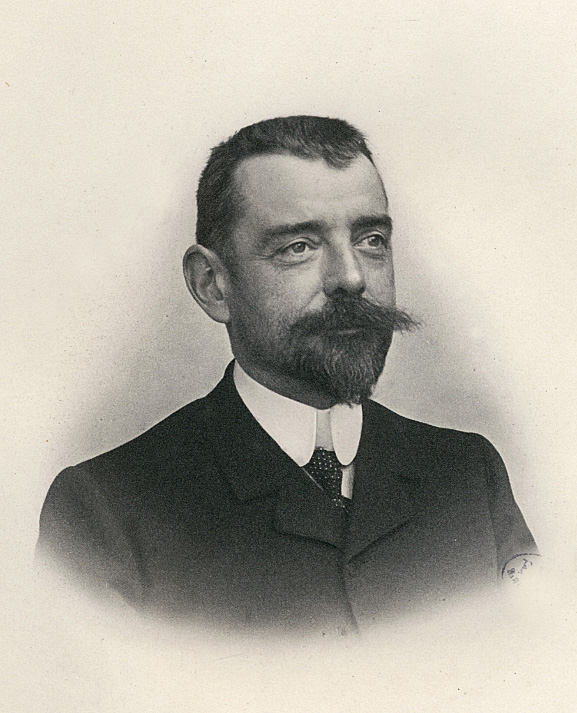
- Born: 27 February 1861; Épinal, France
- Died: 24 April 1935 (aged 74); Paris, France
- Citizenship: France
- Scientific career
- Fields: Teuthology, malacology
- Thesis: Recherches sur l'anatomie des brachiopodes inarticulés (1885)

Louis Marie Adolphe Olivier Édouard Joubin (27 February 1861 in Épinal – 24 April 1935 in Paris) was a professor at the Muséum national d'Histoire naturelle in Paris. He published works on nemerteans, chaetognatha, cephalopods, and other molluscs.

He served as an assistant to Henri de Lacaze-Duthiers, subsequently becoming director of the laboratories at Banyuls-sur-Mer (1882) and Roscoff (1884). Later on, he became an instructor at the University of Rennes, and in 1903 succeeded Edmond Perrier as chaire des mollusques, des vers et des zoophytes at the Muséum national d'Histoire naturelle (from 1917 onward his title was chaire des mollusques). In 1906 he was chosen by Albert I, Prince of Monaco to be in charge of instruction at the Institut océanographique.

In 1905 he was named president of the Société zoologique de France. In 1920 he became a member of the Académie des Sciences.

Joubin's squid (Joubiniteuthis portieri) is named for him, as is Anoxycalyx joubini, a hexactinellid sponge whose lifespan is purportedly 10,000 years.

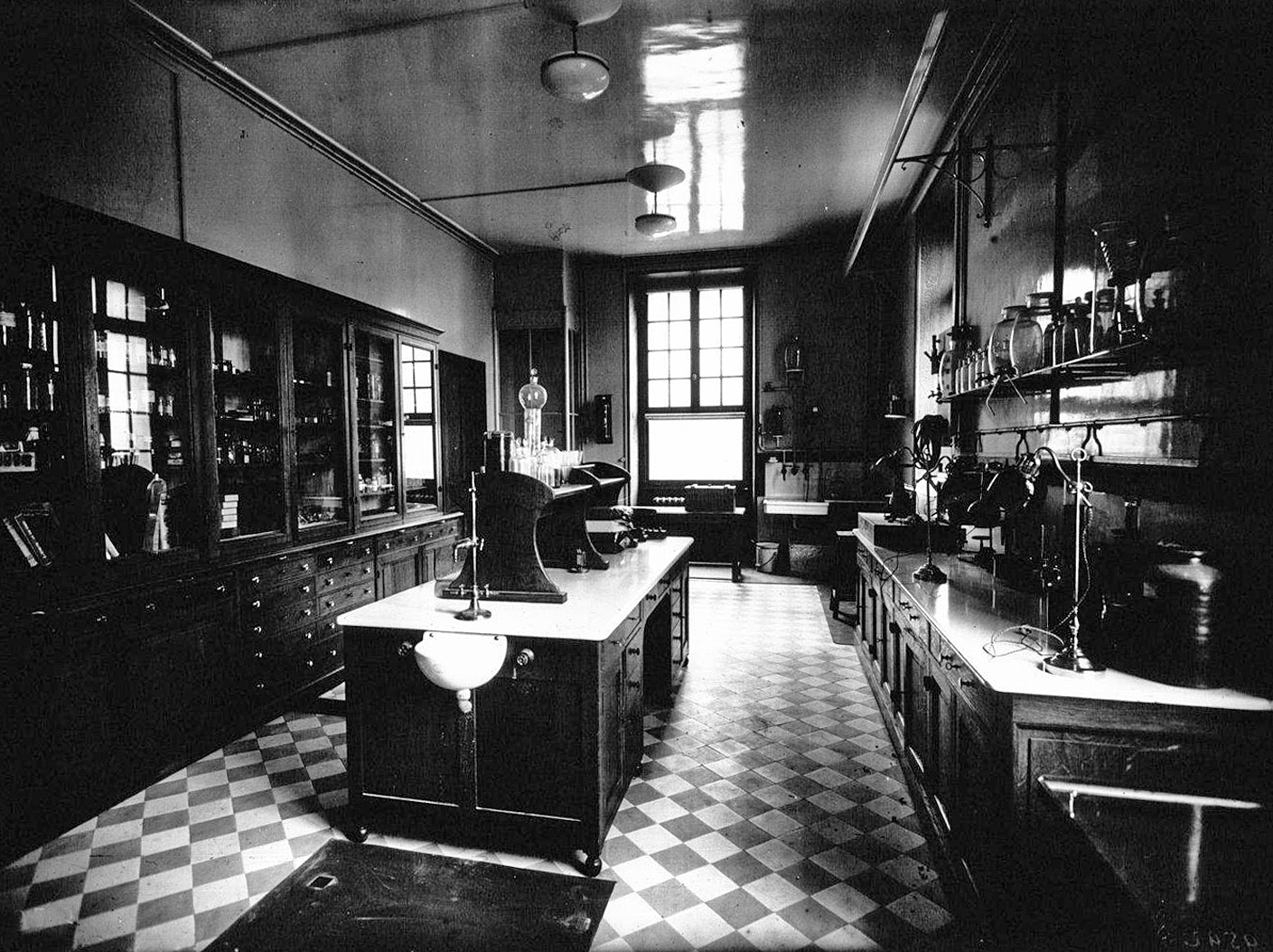
Joubin's laboratory at the Institut Océanographique (1911).

== Written works ==
- Les Némertiens, 1894 - Nemerteans.
- Contribution à l'étude des Céphalopodes de l'Atlantique Nord, 1895 - Contributions to the study of cephalopods of the North Atlantic.
- Expédition antarctique française (1903-1905) : commandée par le Dr. Jean Charcot. Science naturelles: documents scientifiques. - French Antarctic Expedition (1903–05) : commanded by Jean Baptiste Charcot, Natural science: scientific documents of the expedition.
- Deuxième expédition antarctique française (1908-1910) / Sciences naturelles: documents scientifiques. - Second French Antarctic Expedition (1908–10) / Natural sciences: scientific documents of the expedition.
- La vie dans les océans, 1912 - Life in the oceans.
- Chétognathes provenant des campagnes des yachts Hirondelle et Princesse-Alice, 1885-1910 (with Louis Germain), 1916 - Chaetognatha from campaigns of the yachts Hirondelle and Princesse-Alice, 1885-1910.
- Le fond de la mer, 1920 - The bottom of the sea.
- Les métamorphoses des animaux marins, 1926 - Metamorphosis of marine animals.
- Éléments de biologie marine, 1928 - Elements of marine biology.
- Faune ichthyologique de l'Atlantique nord, 1929 - Ichthyological fauna of the North Atlantic.
- "Cephalopods from the scientific expeditions of Prince Albert I of Monaco"; published in 1995 into English.
