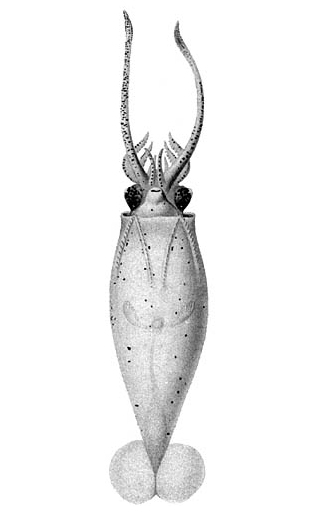
- Liocranchia valdiviae subadult

Scientific classification
- Domain: Eukaryota
- Kingdom: Animalia
- Phylum: Mollusca
- Class: Cephalopoda
- Order: Oegopsida
- Family: Cranchiidae
- Subfamily: Cranchiinae; Prosch, 1847

Type genus
- Cranchia Leach, 1817

Genera
- Cranchia; Leachia; Liocranchia

= Cranchiinae =

Subfamily of squids

Cranchiinae is a subfamily containing four genera of glass squids.

== Species ==
- Genus Cranchia Leach, 1817
  - Cranchia scabra Leach, 1817
- Genus Leachia Lesueur, 1821
  - Leachia atlantica (Degner, 1925)
  - Leachia cyclura Lesueur, 1821
  - Leachia danae (Joubin, 1931)
  - Leachia dislocata Young, 1972
  - Leachia ellipsoptera (Adams & Reeve, 1848)
  - Leachia lemur (Berry, 1920)
  - Leachia pacifica (Issel, 1908)
  - Leachia rynchophorus (Rochebrune, 1884)
- Genus Liocranchia Pfeffer, 1884
  - Liocranchia gardineri *
  - Liocranchia reinhardti
  - Liocranchia valdiviae

The species listed above with an asterisk (*) are questionable and need further study to determine if they are a valid species or a synonym.
