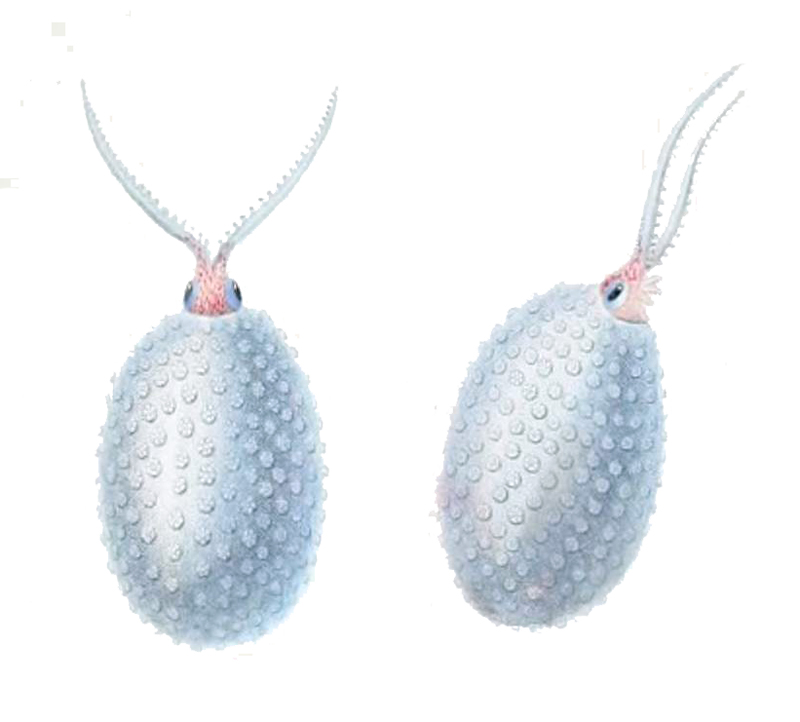
- by Oudart, 1847
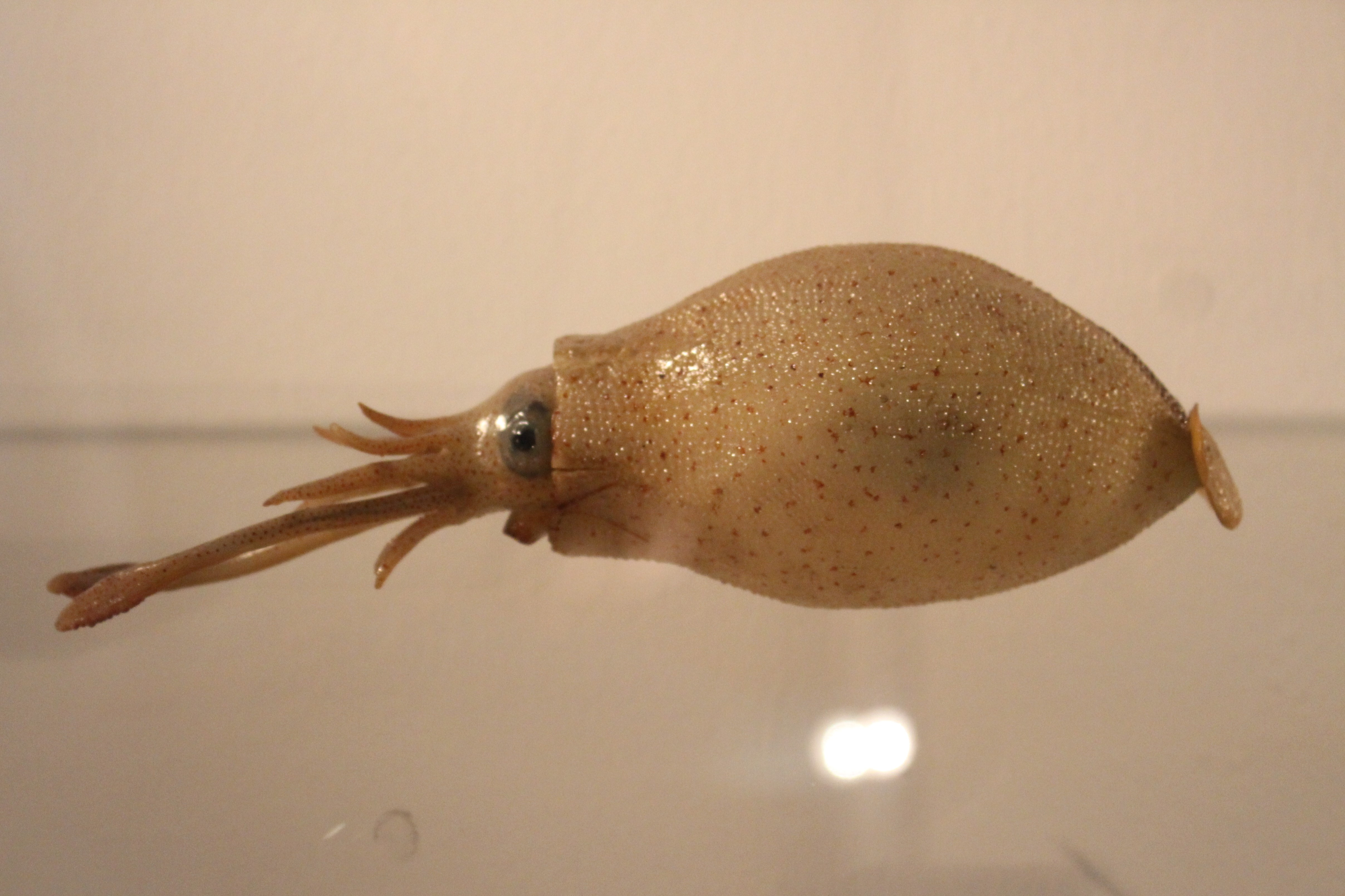
- Model, NHMUK

Conservation status
- Least Concern (IUCN 3.1)

Scientific classification
- Kingdom: Animalia
- Phylum: Mollusca
- Class: Cephalopoda
- Order: Oegopsida
- Family: Cranchiidae
- Subfamily: Cranchiinae
- Genus: Cranchia; Leach, 1817
- Species: C. scabra

Binomial name
- Cranchia scabra Leach, 1817

Synonyms
- Cranchia hispida Pfeffer, 1884; Cranchia tenuitentaculeta Pfeffer, 1884; Loligo cranchia Blainville, 1823; Octopus (Philonexis) eylais d'Orbigny, 1834

= Cranchia scabra =

Species of squid

Cranchia scabra is a species of glass squid, sometimes called the rough glass squid. It is the only species in the genus, and is fairly small (about 150 millimeters (5.9 in)). They reside in the epipelagic zones of the tropical Atlantic. The genus Cranchia is named after John Cranch who first described this species; it has subsequently become the type genus of its family.

Many more species were assigned to this genus in the past, but they were subsequently split out into their own genera. (Note: These include: Cranchia armata, Cranchia bonelliana, Cranchia maculata, Cranchia megalops, Cranchia minimus, and subgenus Cranchia (Liocranchia).)

== Description ==
Typical of its family, C. scabra possesses a large ammonium-filled internal cavity which provides buoyancy, which is an energy-saving adaptation typical of deep-sea animals. Akin to other glass squid, they are usually transparent; the chromatophores typical of cephalopods are often kept closed so that the squid appears see-through.

=== Tubercles ===
C. scabra are characterized by complex tubercles on the surface of their mantle. The scanning electron microscope inspected the tubercles. The cartilagenous tubercles may be small and simple nodules, or large with a complex Maltese cross-form. The tubercles may provide protection, but it is unclear how predators may be affected.

=== Dorsal and Ventral Chambers ===
These squids have a horizontal partition over the mantle cavity. The mantle cavity is divided into 2 dorsal chambers and 1 ventral chamber. An opening in the posterior end of the horizontal membrane connects the dorsal chamber to the ventral chamber. An inhalant opening on the head connects the exterior portion of the horizontal membrane between the dorsal and ventral chambers. A thin membrane is connected to the anterior border of the head and mantle, located along the borders of the dorsal and ventral chambers. This thin membrane prevents water from exiting the dorsal chamber. Water can exit the ventral chamber via a small funnel.

=== Photophores ===
The light-emitting organs, or photophores, around the eyes allow them to see in the dark. This light can deter predators. Female squids have photophores on the tips of their arms which may attract mates.

== Habitat and Distribution ==
Cranchia scabra is distributed across the globe in tropical and subtropical waters, inhabiting the open ocean. Paralarval and juvenile squids are found in the epipelagic to upper mesopelagic zones of the ocean. Adult squids move into the mesopelagic and bathypelagic zones, up to 2,000 metres (6,600 ft) deep.

== Behavior ==
C. scabra are neutrally buoyant animals due to ammonia fluid located in their body cavities. They change orientation and position with rapid movement of their fins. In captivity, C. scabra has been shown to contract its mantle which caused rapid backward movements over a distance of 3-4 body-lengths. Immediately after these contractions, the mantle maintained its contracted shape, but slowly recovered its original, globular shape. Since the mantle shape was very slowly regained and these contractions are used infrequently, researchers have suggested that these short movements are used as escape reactions, rather than continuous movement.

When disturbed, the squid often pulls its head and arms into the mantle cavity, and folds its fins tightly against the mantle to form a turgid ball. The squid may ink into the mantle cavity, making the ball opaque. This was thought to be an aberrant behavior due to the stress and confinement of shipboard aquaria, until the same inking behavior was seen in cranchiids observed from submersibles (in situ). The exact function of this behavior is unknown, but inking could help them change color or may be used as a chemical weapon against predators.

=== Diet ===
C. scabra are known to eat small fish, crustaceans, and other organisms of similar size.

=== Life history ===
Like all cephalopods, glass squids are gonochoric, with separate sexes. Males perform displays to attract potential female mates. During the mating process, the male squids hold the female squids and insert the hectocotylus into the mantle cavity of the female squid. Fertilization occurs within this mantle cavity and embryos hatch into a planktonic stage prior to growing to their adult size.

==== Growth ====
C. scabra are some of the fastest growing squids. During the first 4–5 months of their development, they feed and grow very rapidly in epipelagic waters. They move into deeper waters to mature and spawn.

Statoliths are calcareous structures found in cephalopods which detect body accelerations throughout movement. The age and growth rates of these squids can be estimated through analysis of statolith microstructure. There are two growth zones in statolith microstructures: an inner, translucent postnuclear zone, and an outer, pale white opaque zone. Researchers hypothesize that the translucent peripheral zones in statoliths develop later, after the transition to deep water.

The lifespan of C. scabra is unknown; the oldest immature squid studied were 166 days old, with MLs of 114 and 118 millimetres (4.5 and 4.6 in).
