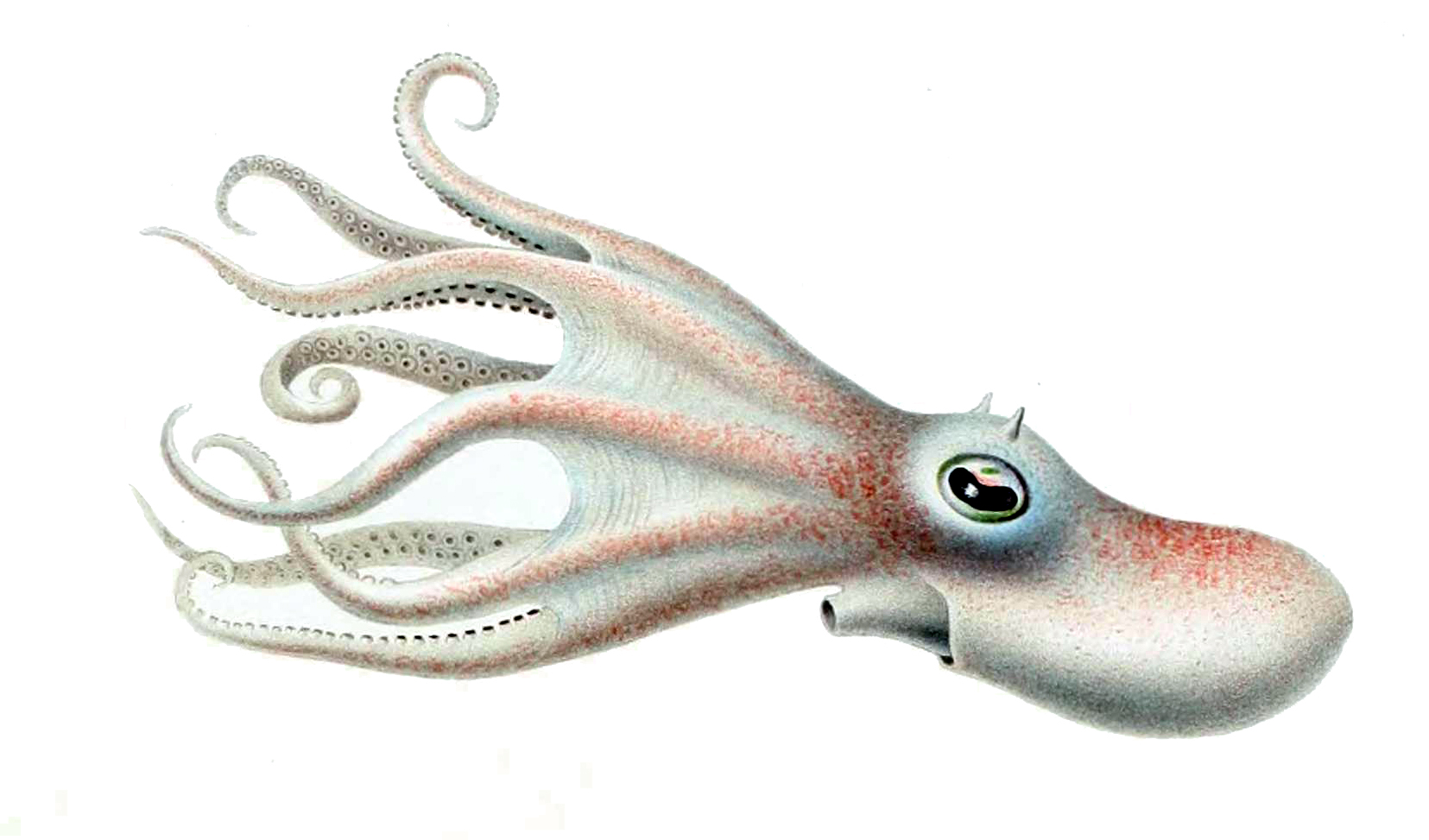
- Bathypolypus valdiviae

Scientific classification
- Kingdom: Animalia
- Phylum: Mollusca
- Class: Cephalopoda
- Order: Octopoda
- Family: Bathypolypodidae; Robson, 1929
- Genus: Bathypolypus; Grimpe, 1921

Type species
- Octopus arcticus (Fabricius, 1777)

Species
- See text

Synonyms
- Atlantoctopus Grimpe, 1921; Benthoctopus Grimpe, 1921

= Bathypolypus =

Genus of molluscs

Bathypolypus is a genus of octopuses in the monotypic family Bathypolypodidae.

== Species ==
Species in the genus Bathypolypus include:

- Bathypolypus arcticus (Prosch, 1847)
  - Bathypolypus arcticus arcticus – spoonarm octopus (Prosch, 1847)
  - Bathypolypus arcticus proschi Muus, 1962
- Bathypolypus rubrostictus Kaneko & Kubodera, 2008
- Bathypolypus sponsalis – globose octopus (Fischer & Fischer, 1892)
- Bathypolypus valdiviae – boxer octopus (Thiele in Chun, 1915)
- Bathypolypus bairdii - Baird's Octopus Verrill, 1873
- Bathypolypus ergasticus P. Fischer & H. Fischer, 1892
- Bathypolypus pugniger Muus, 2002
- Bathypolypus rubrostictus Kaneko & Kubodera, 2008

Synonyms:

- Bathypolypus salebrosus (Sasaki, 1920) is a synonym for Sasakiopus salebrosus (Sasaki, 1920)
- Bathypolypus faeroensis (Frederick Stratten Russel|Russell) is a synonym for Bathypolypus arcticus (Prosch, 1847) (Fabricius, 1777)
