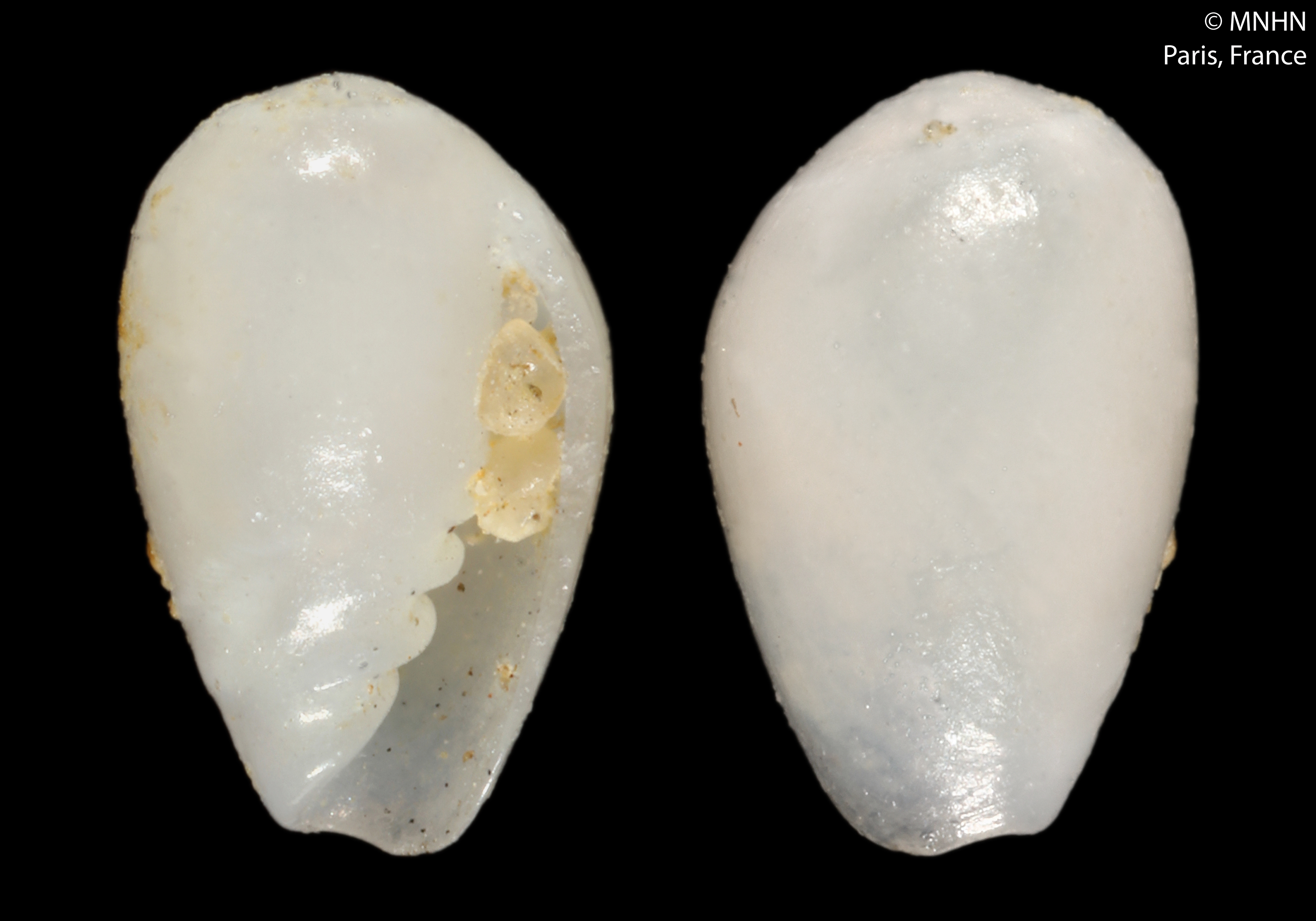
- Shell of Gibberula sueziensis (paralectotype at MNHN, Paris)

Scientific classification
- Kingdom: Animalia
- Phylum: Mollusca
- Class: Gastropoda
- Subclass: Caenogastropoda
- Order: Neogastropoda
- Family: Cystiscidae
- Subfamily: Cystiscinae
- Genus: Gibberula
- Species: G. sueziensis

Binomial name
- Gibberula sueziensis (Issel, 1869)

Synonyms
- Marginella sueziensis Issel, 1869

= Gibberula sueziensis =

Species of gastropod

Gibberula sueziensis is a species of sea snail, a marine gastropod mollusk, in the family Cystiscidae.

== Description ==
The length of the shell attains 2.95 mm (0.116 in).

== Distribution ==
This marine species occurs in Egyptian part of the Red Sea.
