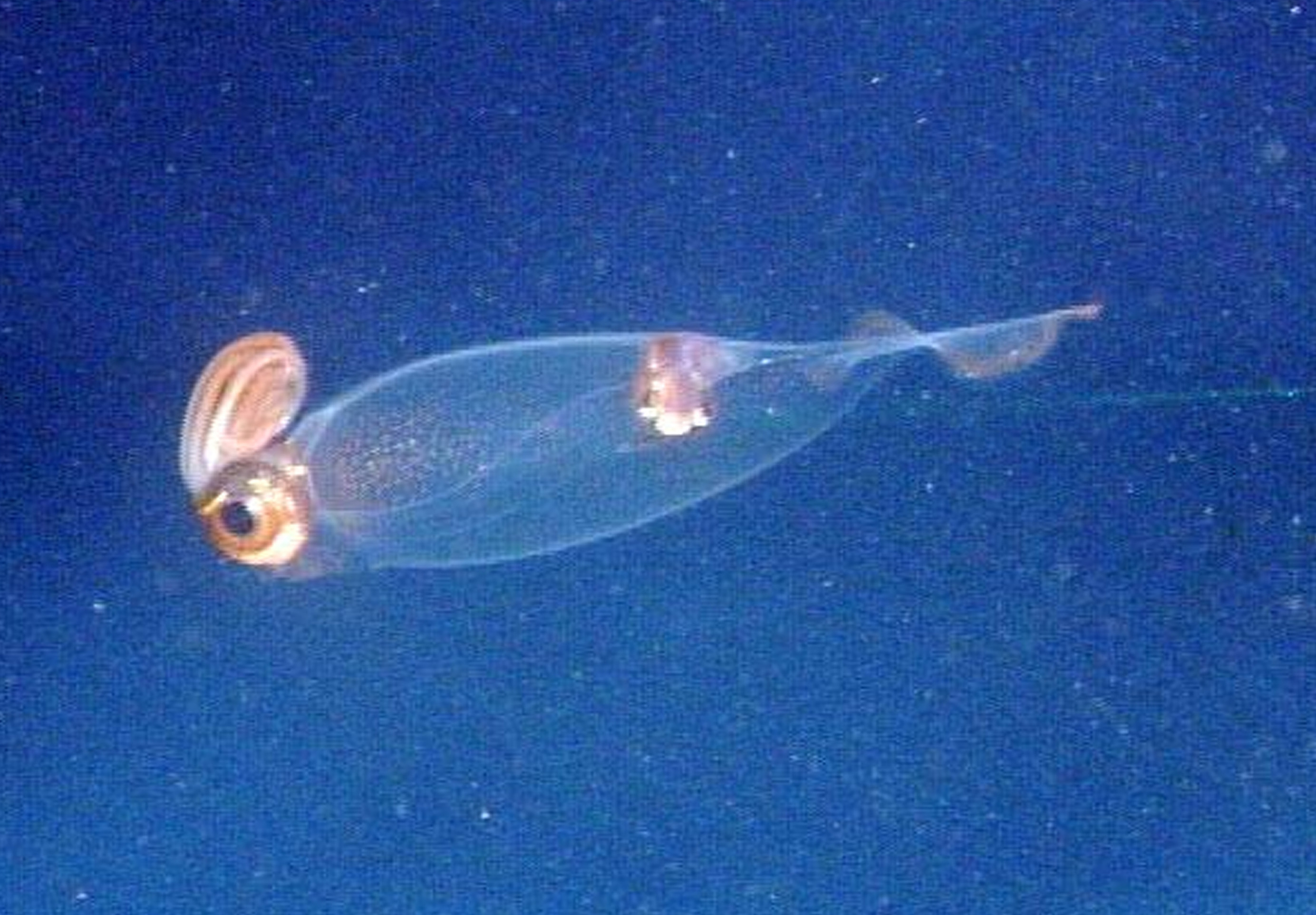
- Teuthowenia megalops swimming in the "cockatoo" posture

Conservation status
- Least Concern (IUCN 3.1)

Scientific classification
- Kingdom: Animalia
- Phylum: Mollusca
- Class: Cephalopoda
- Order: Oegopsida
- Family: Cranchiidae
- Genus: Teuthowenia
- Species: T. megalops

Binomial name
- Teuthowenia megalops (Prosch, 1849)
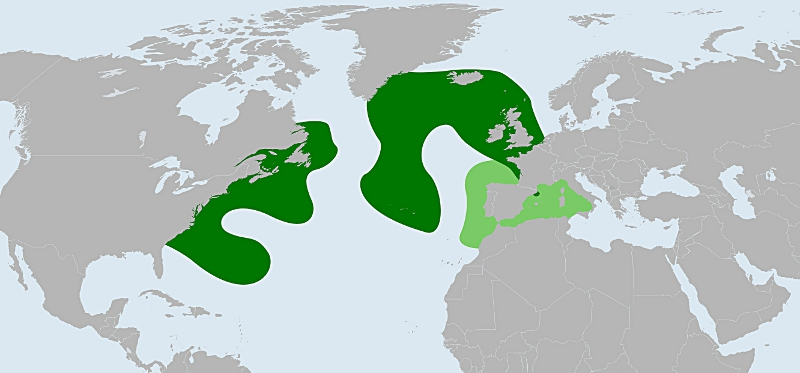
- Distribution of Teuthowenia megalops: Confirmed presence Possible range

Synonyms
- Cranchia megalops Prosch, 1849; Desmoteuthis tenera Verrill, 1881; Desmoteuthis thori Degner, 1925; Leachia hyperborea Steenstrup, 1856; Owenia megalops (Prosch, 1849); Taonidium pfefferi Massy, 1913; Taonius megalops (Prosch, 1849)...and see text

= Teuthowenia megalops =

Atlantic cranch squid

Species of squid

Teuthowenia megalops, sometimes known as the Atlantic cranch squid, is a species of glass squid from the subarctic and temperate waters of the northern Atlantic Ocean. They are moderately sized squid with a maximum mantle length of 40 cm (16 in). Their very large eyes are the source for the specific name megalops (Greek for "large eyes"). Like other members of the genus Teuthowenia, they are easily recognizable by the presence of three bioluminescent organs (photophores) on their eyeballs.

== Description ==
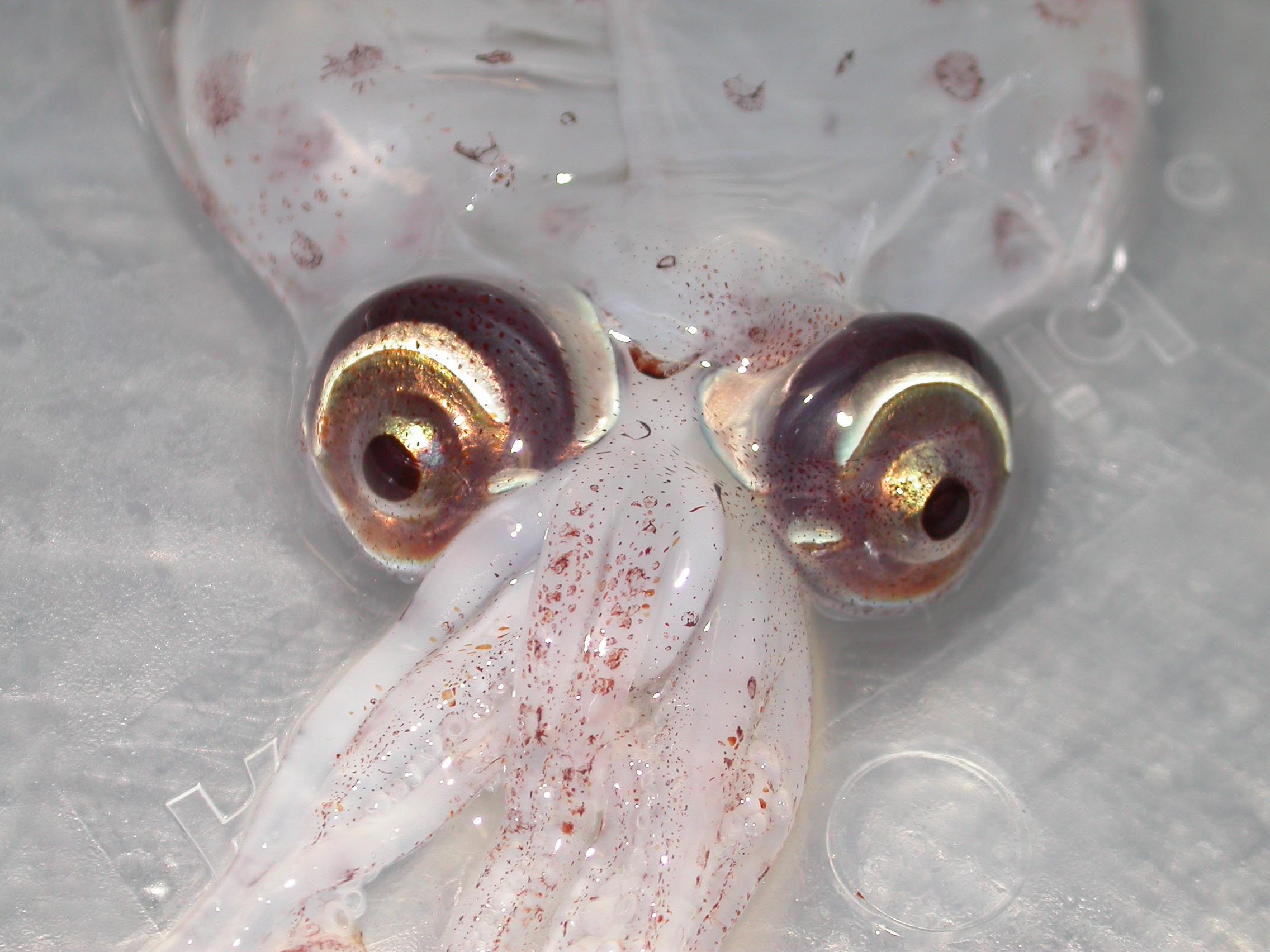
Closeup of eyes of Teuthowenia megalops (ventral aspect). The three photophores of each eye are clearly visible as light golden-yellow areas.

Teuthowenia megalops are moderately sized glass squid. They are sexually dimorphic, reaching mantle lengths between 37 and 40 cm (15 and 16 in) for females, and 18.2 to 24.4 cm (7.2 to 9.6 in) for males. They have very large forward-facing eyes, each possessing three bioluminescent organs (photophores), a defining characteristic of the genus Teuthowenia. One of the photophores is oval-shaped and small, located at the upper part near the lens of each eye. The other two are concentric and located at the sides and bottom of the eyeball. One of them is very narrow and curves halfway around the lens.; the other is very large and crescent-shaped, straddling half of the bottom surface of the eyeball.

The mantle is conical and elongated with a narrow rear tip. The mantle walls are thin and leathery. The funnel locking-apparatus are small and oval to spindle-shaped. A single cartilaginous tubercle is present at the mantle margins, though rarely it may be absent. The fins are long and narrow, starting at about 40 to 60% of the length of the mantle, far from where the body is the widest. They extend past the rear tip of the body, fuse with each other at the middle, and end with a pair of small lobes.

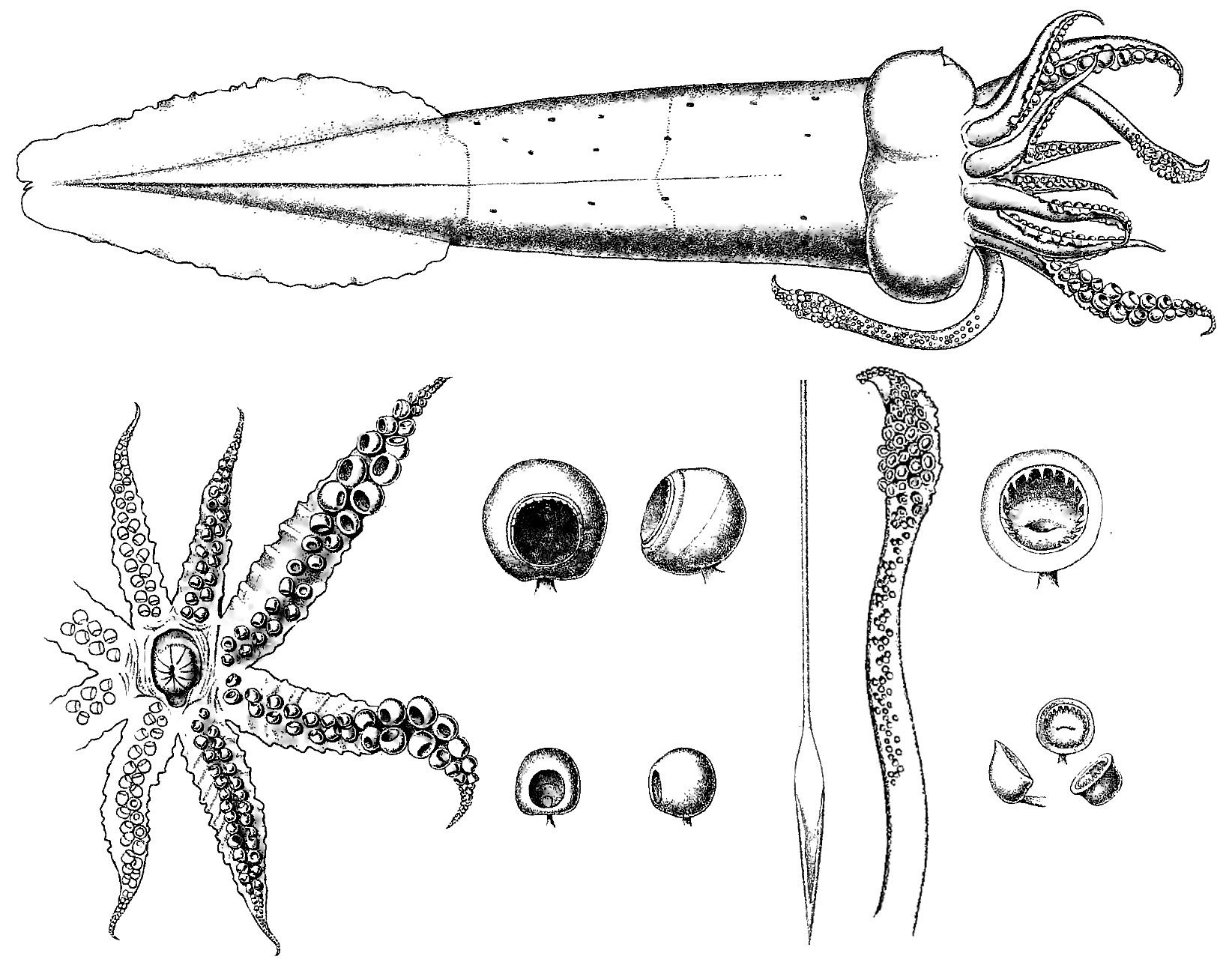
Counterclockwise from top: dorsal aspect; arms and buccal (mouth) cavity; arm suckers; gladius; tentacle; and tentacular suckers

The arms are short to medium length, about a fourth to half of the mantle length. In subadults and females, the third pair of arms is the longest, followed by the second, first, and the fourth pairs (length formula: III>II>I>IV). Sometimes the fourth and first pairs may be of equal or almost equal length (length formula: III>II>I=IV). Adult males may have the first and second pair of equal length (but shorter than the third pair), or the first pair may be the longest of all the arms (length formula: III>I=II>IV or I>III>II>IV). They all possess two rows of cup-shaped to globular suckers that lack hooks. The suckers on the midportion of the third and second pair of arms are greatly enlarged, exceeding the width of the arms.

In subadults of both sexes and mature females, the basal and mid-arm suckers are usually smooth, though the small terminal suckers possess six to ten short triangular teeth on the distal and lateral rims. About 6 to 9% of the tips of all the arms of subadult and adult females are also modified into grasping end-organs. In adult males, the arms are all sexually modified in some way. The first pair becomes elongated and thicker, with swollen midportions and expanded protective membranes. The second pair has elongated and swollen tips, with reduced protective membranes. The third and fourth pairs all have slender whip-like tips. The suckers on the tips of the second pair have swollen collars and possess small pointed teeth around their entire margin, while the rest of the suckers on all the arms have small rounded or triangular teeth on the distal and lateral rims. The mid-arm and basal suckers of the third and fourth pairs also have swollen collars and greatly reduced openings.

The tentacles are short and muscular. They have four rows of carpal ("wrist") suckers, arranged into a zigzag pattern on 1/2 to 2/3 of the distal end of the tentacles leading towards the tentacular clubs. The suckers on the tentacular club are set on long protrusions and possess numerous short, sharp teeth on their entire margins. The largest of these possess 19 to 24 teeth.

== Distribution and habitat ==
Teuthowenia megalops are deep-water pelagic squid. They are found in the water column at depths of 405 to 4,515 m (1,329 to 14,813 ft), and at water temperatures of 21 to 3 °C (70 to 37 °F), though adults may rarely be found at depths of less than 25 m (82 ft) from the surface. They exhibit diel vertical migration, moving closer to the surface in nighttime and diving deeper during daytime. Paralarvae and subadults are usually found in the upper 300 m (980 ft) of the surface, and gradually dive deeper as they grow larger.

The distribution of Teuthowenia megalops is restricted to the subarctic and temperate waters of the northern Atlantic Ocean. In the northwestern Atlantic, they can be found along the eastern coast of North America, from Labrador in Canada to Georgia in the United States; extending eastward towards the Bermuda islands and the New England Seamounts. In the northeastern Atlantic, they inhabit the waters between Greenland and Iceland and south towards the Azores (following the Mid-Atlantic Ridge); and the area around the Rockall Basin, Britain, Ireland, and (during winter) northern Portugal. A single specimen has also been recovered from the Mediterranean Sea, making it possible that their range extends further south than currently known. Teuthowenia megalops are known to be relatively abundant. They are frequently encountered in submersibles, and younger individuals are frequently caught in shallower waters.

The three species of Teuthowenia do not appear to have overlapping ranges, with Teuthowenia pellucida restricted to the Southern Hemisphere and Teuthowenia maculata to the eastern central part of the Atlantic Ocean off the coast of West Africa. Thus specimens can be reliably identified based on where they may have been caught. Several squid specimens have also been recovered and observed from the Pacific Ocean in 1969, 1974, 2000, and 2002. Their close resemblance to Teuthowenia megalops led them to be continually misidentified as belonging to Teuthowenia megalops. However closer examinations reveal that the arrangement of photophores on the eyes is different, making it certain that they are not Teuthowenia megalops. They are very likely to be individuals of Galiteuthis phyllura.

== Ecology and biology ==
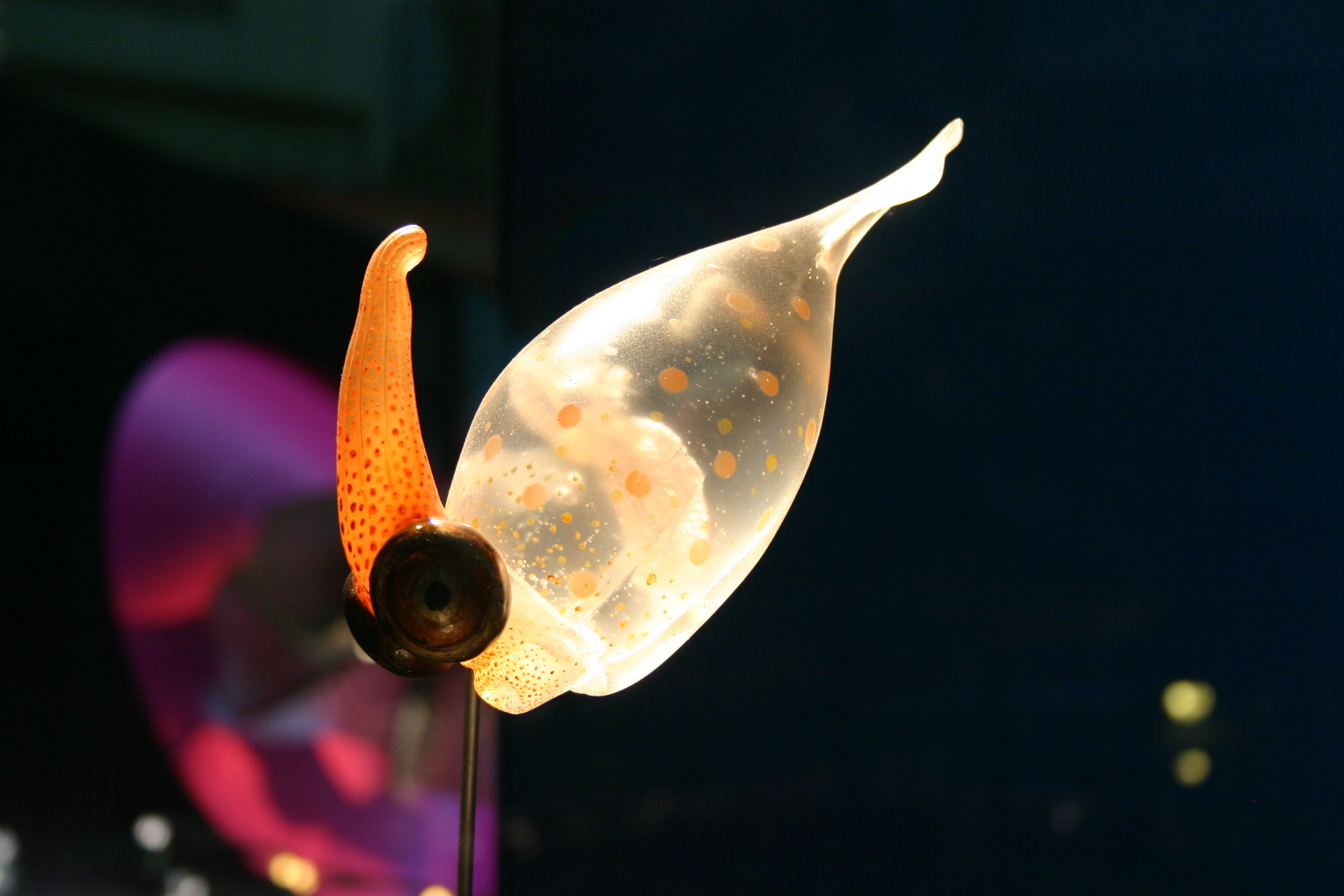
Teuthowenia megalops from the Smithsonian National Museum of Natural History shown in the "cockatoo" posture. The spindle-shaped digestive glands remain oriented vertically, no matter what direction the squid's head and body are facing.

Like other members of the family Cranchiidae, Teuthowenia megalops possess a remarkable flotation system that enables them to remain in the water column at neutral buoyancy. The system uses enormous bilobed coelomic chambers filled with ammonium chloride derived as waste products from their nitrogen metabolism. The ammonium chloride has a lower density than water, which enables the squid to float. In experiments, puncturing the chambers and draining the ammonium chloride resulted in the squid sinking rapidly. The chamber is also lined with muscles that contract and expand regularly in peristaltic waves. The movement draws water into the mantle cavity and pushes it out again through the funnel, aerating the gills in the process.

As a result of this adaptation, Teuthowenia megalops are sluggish swimmers. Unlike other squids, they do not need to contract their mantle muscles to breathe, but their modified flotation and respiratory systems restrict their ability to jet away from threats. They generally float passively in the "cockatoo" posture typical of glass squids (which are also known as cockatoo squids for this reason). They resemble a horizontal cockatoo, hence the name. In this posture, they rotate around their spindle-shaped digestive glands, the only internal organs of the squid clearly visible through their mostly transparent bodies. Regardless of the direction their heads or mantles are facing, the digestive glands are always kept oriented vertically.

=== Life cycle ===
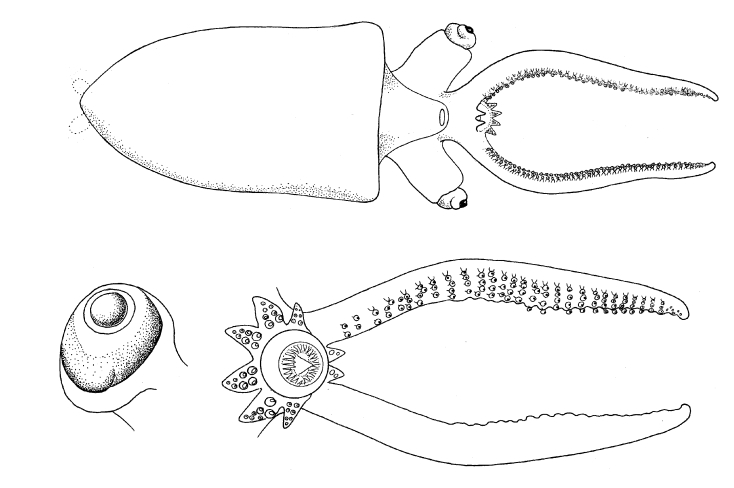
Paralarva of Teuthowenia megalops, about 6.2 mm (0.24 in) in mantle length. Clockwise from top: ventral aspect, oral aspect, closeup of eye with photophore anlage

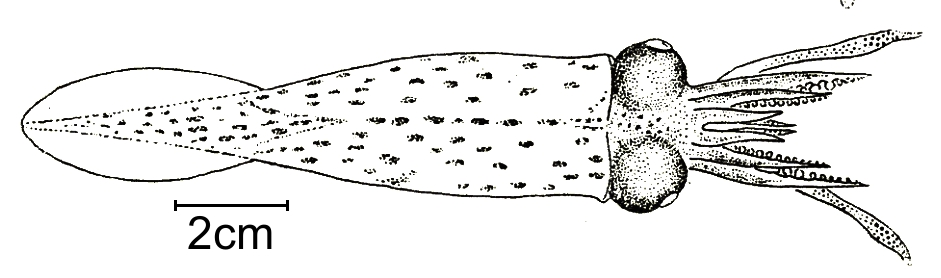
Teuthowenia megalops subadult

The life cycle of Teuthowenia megalops has not been extensively observed. From the recorded depths of captured adult specimens, it is assumed that mating and spawning happens in the deep midwaters, at depths greater than 1,000 m (3,300 ft). At these depths, the waters are quite dark. The bioluminescent photophores as well as pheromones released into the water may help the squid find mates. Once the males find the females, they harpoon them with spermatophores directly on the mantles. The spermatophores penetrate into the mantle cavity of the female where they discharge sperm. The females spawn only once before dying. No eggs of the species have ever been collected from the wild, but examination of collected specimens of gravid females puts the estimated fecundity at 70,000 to 80,000 eggs per individual.

Upon hatching, the paralarvae gradually float or swim towards shallower waters. The paralarvae differ from adults in having stouter barrel-shaped bodies with a blunt posterior end. The fins are very small and unfused. The funnel is broad and large and lack tubercles on the funnel-mantle fusion, unlike in adults. The eyes are small with developing photophores visible. They are slightly flattened dorsoventrally and mounted on short thick stalks. The arms are mere stubs, with lengths of 0.8 to 1.4 mm (0.031 to 0.055 in) when they reach mantle lengths of 8 to 9 mm (0.31 to 0.35 in). In contrast, the tentacles are very long and thick but without an expanded club. Four rows of suckers extend from the club to almost the base of the stalks. The mantle, head, arms, and tentacles are covered with relatively large widely spaced chromatophores.

The paralarvae develop the characteristic tubercle at the funnel-mantle fusion once they reach the mantle lengths between 30 and 60 mm (1.2 and 2.4 in). They enter the subadult stage once the eyes lose their stalks, becoming sessile, at sizes between 75 and 95 mm (3.0 and 3.7 in). The arms and arm suckers enlarge rapidly and males begin to develop their arm modifications (with the exception of the modifications of the first arm pair, which occurs near maturity). At this stage they may already have moved back to depths exceeding 1,000 m (3,300 ft).

The entire lifespan of Teuthowenia megalops is estimated to be two to three years.

=== Predators ===
Teuthowenia megalops are preyed upon by predatory fish like the blue shark (Prionace glauca) and swordfish (Xiphias gladius). They also constitute a major part of the diet of cetaceans like the long-finned pilot whale (Globicephala melaena), bottlenose whale (Hyperoodon ampullatus), sperm whale (Physeter macrocephalus), and Cuvier's beaked whale (Ziphius cavirostris).

=== Defense ===
Teuthowenia megalops exhibits a bizarre defensive behavior when threatened. Upon initial disturbance, its response is similar to that of other cephalopods, releasing a cloud of ink into the water and jetting away. However, if the threat persists, it reacts by inflating itself into a ball. This happens in several steps, at any point in which it may cease inflating further if the disturbance stops.

The first step is to turn its fins and gladius inside out. This is followed by the head and arms being inverted into the mantle cavity. Then the mantle is filled with seawater, turning them perfectly spherical. The tentacles are the last to be retracted. At this point the chromatophores (normally mere pinpoints in its predominantly transparent body) expand to about four times their usual diameter. They are arranged into concentric circles on the bloated mantle, confusing predators as to the location of the eyes. If the threat still does not go away, its last resort is to again eject ink. However, the ink is not released, instead it is retained inside the now spherical mantle cavity. The squid thus becomes a completely opaque black ball.

The squid retains the shape for about half an hour then its starts to tentatively extend its head and tentacles out of the mantle, followed by the fins and gladius. When assured that the threat has gone, it then gradually releases the ink and seawater stored in its mantle. All this happens with no apparent injury to the squid, despite the considerable contortions its body just went through.

This behavior was first observed among captured live specimens in 1972 by the marine biologist Peter Noel Dilly. It was the first instance of such a behavior being observed among cephalopods. Since then, similar behavior has been found in other glass squids, like Cranchia scabra and Teuthowenia pellucida.

== Taxonomy and nomenclature ==
Teuthowenia megalops is one of the three species currently classified under the genus Teuthowenia. They are included under the subfamily Taoniinae of the family Cranchiidae. The species does not have widely used common names, but the Food and Agriculture Organization (FAO) of the United Nations gives them the names of Atlantic cranch squid in English, encornet-outre Atlantique in French, cranquiluria Atlantica in Spanish, and totano tutt'occhi in Italian. Like other genera belonging to Cranchiidae, Teuthowenia megalops has gone through numerous and convoluted taxonomic and nomenclatural revisions. It has been variously classified under the genera Cranchia, Leachia, Megalocranchia, and Taonius; as well as the now unaccepted genera Desmoteuthis, Hensenioteuthis, Loligopsis, and Verrilliteuthis. Various combinations of which has been paired with the specific names of Cranchia megalops, Leachia hyperborea, Taonidium pfefferi (now nomen dubium), Desmoteuthis tenera, and Desmoteuthis thori.

=== Taxonomic history ===
The species was first described by the Danish zoologist Ferdinand Victor Alphons Prosch in 1849 as Cranchia megalops. The type specimens were paralarvae obtained off the Faeroe Islands. He included it under a new "subfamilia Cranchidæ" (now the family Cranchiidae), after noticing its similarity to Cranchia scabra and Cranchia maculata (now Teuthowenia maculata). He further divided the group into two subgenera, placing the latter two under the subgenus Cranchia and separating Cranchia megalops into the subgenus Owenia (named after the British biologist Richard Owen). The specific name was derived from Greek for "large eyes", from μέγας (megas, "great") and ὤψ (ops, "eye" or "face").

In 1850, the Danish malacologist Otto Andreas Lowson Mörch pointed out mistakes in Prosch's original description. In 1856, the Danish zoologist Japetus Steenstrup mentioned a specimen of cranchiid squid recovered from Baffin Bay which he had named Leachia hyperborea. Later in 1861, Steenstrup established the new genus Taonius, including Loligo pavo (now Taonius pavo) and his species Leachia hyperborea (as Taonius hyperboreus) within it. In the same work, he was also the first to point out that Prosch had made the error of including juveniles of Gonatus along with his diagnosis of Cranchia megalops. In 1879, the American malacologist George Washington Tryon included Teuthowenia megalops under the genus Cranchia, together with Teuthowenia maculata (then Cranchia maculata). But he separated Steenstrup's Taonius hyperboreus to the genus Loligopsis along with Taonius pavo.

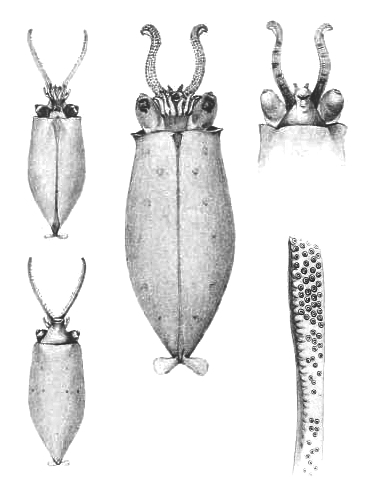
Illustration of Teuthowenia megalops paralarvae at different growth stages, with a closeup of the suckers on a tentacle. From Georg Johann Pfeffer's Die Cephalopoden der Plankton-Expedition (1912)

In 1881, the American zoologist Addison Emery Verrill established the genus Desmoteuthis for a new species he named Desmoteuthis tenera caught off New England. He also recovered several specimens of Taonius pavo which he incorrectly identified as Taonius hyperboreus, leading him to also include Taonius hyperboreus under his new genus as Desmoteuthis hyperborea. In 1884 and subsequently in 1886, the British zoologist William Evans Hoyle recognized Verrill's mistake after examining Verrill's well-illustrated paper. He synonymized Verrill's genus Desmoteuthis back to Steenstrup's Taonius. He also tentatively identified Verrill's Desmoteuthis tenera as a possible synonym of Taonius hyperboreus. In 1884, the German zoologist Georg Johann Pfeffer established the genus Megalocranchia, using the type species Megalocranchia maxima. Though the type specimens were destroyed in World War II, examinations of his description and illustrations reveal that Megalocranchia maxima was definitely not from the genus Teuthowenia. Despite this, Pfeffer synonymized Megalocranchia with Verrill's Desmoteuthis in 1900. He mostly followed Hoyle's conclusions regarding Taonius pavo but retained the genus Desmoteuthis for Taonius hyperboreus. He also raised the Prosch's subgenus Owenia to genus level, thus renaming Cranchia megalops to Owenia megalops. However, the name Owenia was already preoccupied. Thus in 1910, the German zoologist Carl Chun established the genus Teuthowenia in its place, from Greek τευθίς (teuthis, "squid") + Owen, as in the original name. Chun also first described Desmoteuthis pellucida (now Teuthowenia pellucida) from the same work.

In 1912, the American zoologist Samuel Stillman Berry agreed with Hoyle in concluding that Verrill's Desmoteuthis is a synonym of Taonius. But he made the mistake of using Pfeffer's Megalocranchia for Desmoteuthis hyperborea; and inexplicably established a new genus Verrilliteuthis for Desmoteuthis tenera (which had previously already been recognized as a synonym of Desmoteuthis hyperborea). Pfeffer followed suit in the same year by resurrecting Megalocranchia in agreement with Berry, though he still retained Desmoteuthis hyperborea in Desmoteuthis.

In 1925, the German malacologist Eduard Degner first described the growth stages of Desmoteuthis hyperborea during the Danish Oceanographical Expeditions (1908–1910) to the Mediterranean Sea aboard the Danish research vessel Thor. He also described a new species Desmoteuthis thori from a subadult female specimen which displayed grasping end-organs. He failed to connect it to Teuthowenia megalops for two reasons. The first was that he lacked specimens of Desmoteuthis hyperborea between the growth stages of 6 to 84 mm (0.24 to 3.31 in) in mantle length. The second was that he did not realize that the distinctive end-organs on his specimen for Desmoteuthis thori was actually a characteristic of Teuthowenia megalops found only in maturing and adult females. In 1934, the German zoologist Johannes Thiele further complicated matters by including Teuthowenia under Pfeffer's genus Hensenioteuthis (now nomen dubium), together with Helicocranchia, Ascoteuthis, and the nominate subgenus Hensenioteuthis. At the same time, he also accepted Verrilliteuthis hyperborea.

In 1956 when the Danish marine biologist Bent J. Muus discovered that Prosch's Cranchia (Owenia) megalops and Steenstrup's Leachia hyperborea belong to the same species. The former being the paralarval stage of the latter. He synonymized the two under the name Desmoteuthis megalops, unfortunately retaining Verrill's genus despite it being in synonymy with Taonius. Like Chun, he also made the mistake of including several other unrelated specimens in the species, including Anne L. Massy's Helicocranchia pfefferi, and Chun's Desmoteuthis pellucida and Teuthowenia antarctica (now known to be Galiteuthis glacialis); thus coming to the mistaken conclusion that Teuthowenia megalops inhabits both the northern and Southern Hemispheres. In 1960, the American teuthologist Gilbert L. Voss disagreed with Muus' choice of Desmoteuthis, but also mistakenly followed Berry and thus used the genus Megalocranchia instead. In 1962, the Belgian malacologist William Adam disagreed with both Voss and Muus, and used Berry's Verilliteuthis for a specimen recovered off the coast of Angola (now identified to be Teuthowenia maculata). In the same year, the British teuthologist Malcolm R. Clarke also disagreed with Muus, and transferred various species since moved around back to Steenstrup's genus Taonius as Taonius megalops, alongside Taonius pavo. He also recognized Desmoteuthis tenera and Leachia hyperborea as synonyms under Taonius megalops. Clarke's new combination was the primary name used by subsequent authors until 1985 when the American malacologist Nancy A. Voss finally clarified the convoluted taxonomic history of the family Cranchiidae, retaining Chun's Teuthowenia. The valid combination for the species is currently Teuthowenia megalops.

== In popular culture ==
A photo of a balled-up Teuthowenia megalops was taken by David Shale in 2006 while on a MAR-ECO expedition led by Monty Priede, Director of Oceanlab of the University of Aberdeen. The photo was featured in one of the top ten most viewed news photo galleries of the National Geographic Society. The photo was also posted to the blog Cute Overload, where its comical appearance earned it the nickname Eddie McBlobbles, "the inside-out-seahorse-in-a-ball-nerd of the deep."

== See also ==
- Teuthowenia pellucida, the googly-eyed glass squid
- Megalocranchia fisheri
