= Joculator pulvis =

Scientific classification
- Kingdom: Animalia
- Phylum: Mollusca
- Class: Gastropoda
- Subclass: Caenogastropoda
- Order: incertae sedis
- Family: Cerithiopsidae
- Genus: Joculator
- Species: J. pulvis

Binomial name
- Joculator pulvis (Issel, 1869)

Species of gastropod

Joculator pulvis is a species of small sea snail, a marine gastropod mollusc in the family Cerithiopsidae. The species was described by Issel in 1869.
