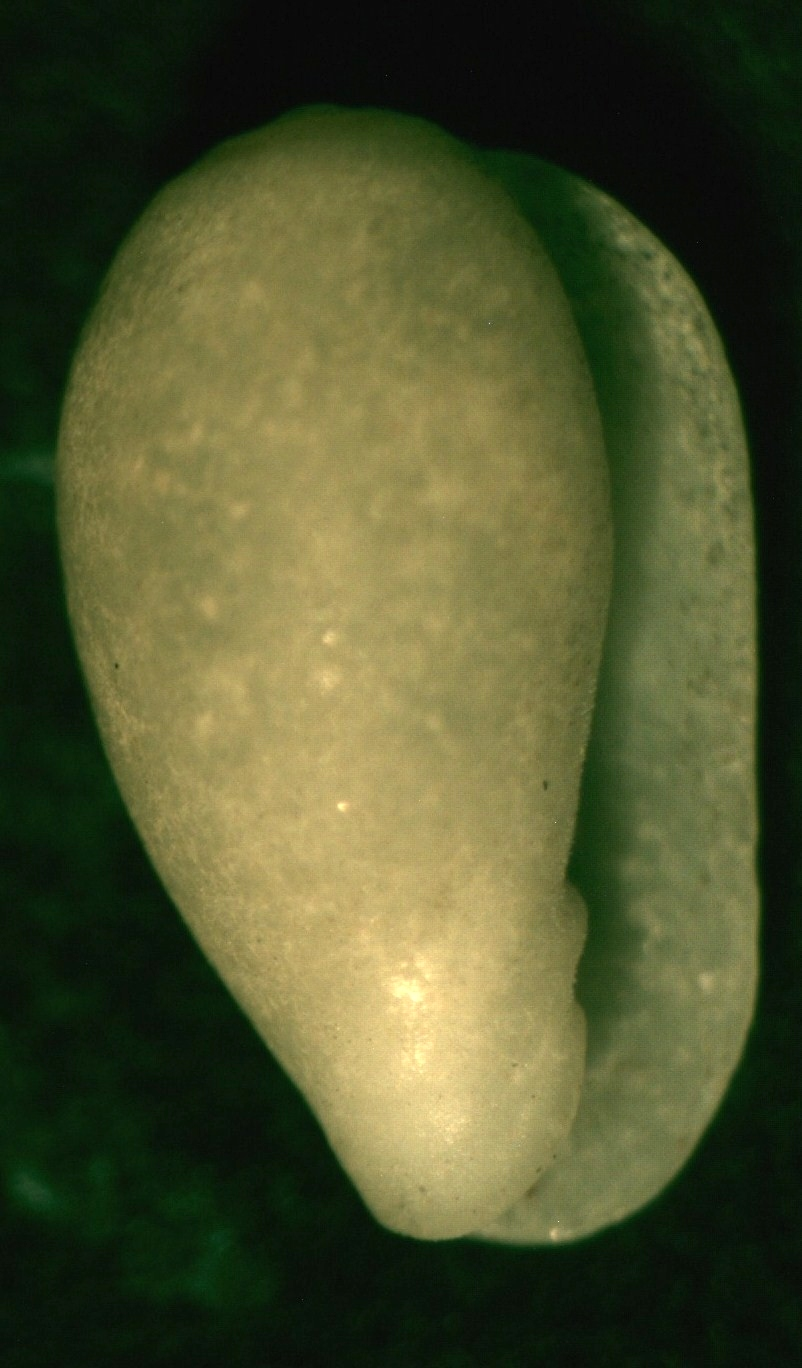
- shell of Gibberula secreta

Scientific classification
- Kingdom: Animalia
- Phylum: Mollusca
- Class: Gastropoda
- Subclass: Caenogastropoda
- Order: Neogastropoda
- Family: Cystiscidae
- Subfamily: Cystiscinae
- Genus: Gibberula
- Species: G. savignyi

Binomial name
- Gibberula savignyi (Issel, 1869)

Synonyms
- Marginella savignyi Issel, 1869

= Gibberula savignyi =

Species of gastropod

Gibberula savignyi is a species of sea snail, a marine gastropod mollusk in the family Cystiscidae.
