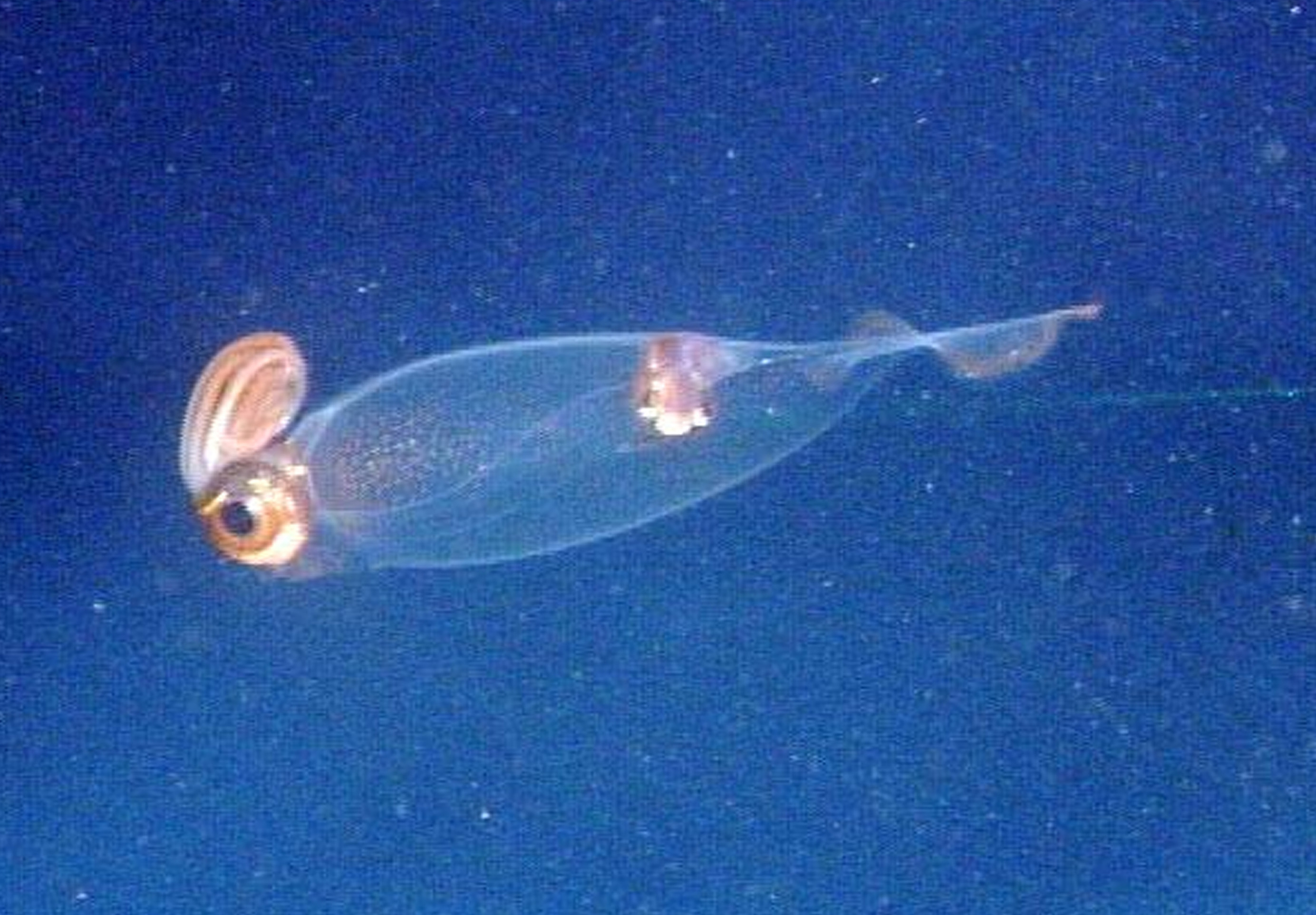
- Teuthowenia megalops

Scientific classification
- Domain: Eukaryota
- Kingdom: Animalia
- Phylum: Mollusca
- Class: Cephalopoda
- Order: Oegopsida
- Family: Cranchiidae
- Subfamily: Taoniinae
- Genus: Teuthowenia; Chun, 1910

Type species
- Cranchia (Owenia) megalops Prosch, 1849

Species
- See text.

= Teuthowenia =

Genus of squids

Teuthowenia is a genus of glass squid in the subfamily Taoniinae. Members of this genus are characterized by their deep-sea habitat, clear bodies, and ability to engorge themselves with water to become larger when threatened. Each known species has a visible digestive gland, which serves a similar purpose as a stomach and liver.

The genus contains bioluminescent species.

It includes three species:

- Teuthowenia maculata (Leach, 1817) - found in the tropical waters of the eastern Atlantic Ocean.
- Teuthowenia megalops (Prosch, 1849) - found in the subarctic, temperate, and (rarely) subtropical waters of the northern Atlantic Ocean.
- Teuthowenia pellucida (Chun, 1910) - found throughout the oceans of the southern hemisphere.
