= Teuthowenia maculata =

Conservation status
- Data Deficient (IUCN 3.1)

Scientific classification
- Kingdom: Animalia
- Phylum: Mollusca
- Class: Cephalopoda
- Order: Oegopsida
- Family: Cranchiidae
- Genus: Teuthowenia
- Species: T. maculata

Binomial name
- Teuthowenia maculata (Leach, 1817)

Synonyms
- Cranchia maculata Leach, 1817

Species of squid

Teuthowenia maculata is a species of glass squid in the genus Teuthowenia. It is similar to the two other members of its genus - T. megalops and T. pellucida, but it is only found in the tropical waters off the coast of Africa in the eastern Atlantic Ocean. The largest recorded specimen is an immature male with a mantle length of 143 millimetres (5.6 in).
