= Bathypolypus rubrostictus =

Conservation status
- Data Deficient (IUCN 3.1)

Scientific classification
- Kingdom: Animalia
- Phylum: Mollusca
- Class: Cephalopoda
- Order: Octopoda
- Family: Bathypolypodidae
- Genus: Bathypolypus
- Species: B. rubrostictus

Binomial name
- Bathypolypus rubrostictus Kaneko & Kubodera, 2008

Species of octopus

Bathypolypus rubrostictus is a species of octopus in the family Bathypolypodidae. Only one specimen, a male, has been found.

== Distribution ==
Bathypolypus rubrostictus was initially identified from a specimen off the coast of the Ryukyu Islands in the South China Sea off the coast of Japan. It inhabits the upper bathyal waters at 350–370 m. Unlike all other species in the genus Bathypolypus, B. rubrostictus lives in the Pacific Ocean, while all the other species in its genus inhabit the Atlantic Ocean.

== Description ==
This species is 20 mm in mantle length (ML) and its arms are short and stubby (2-2.5 times ML). Its body is covered with small, brown-red spots, and its web is pale reddish-brown. Like most deep-sea octopuses and all species in the genus Bathypolypus, B. rubrostictus lacks an ink sac.

== Ecology ==
Nothing is known of their lifespan, diet, or biology, as only a single specimen has been discovered.
