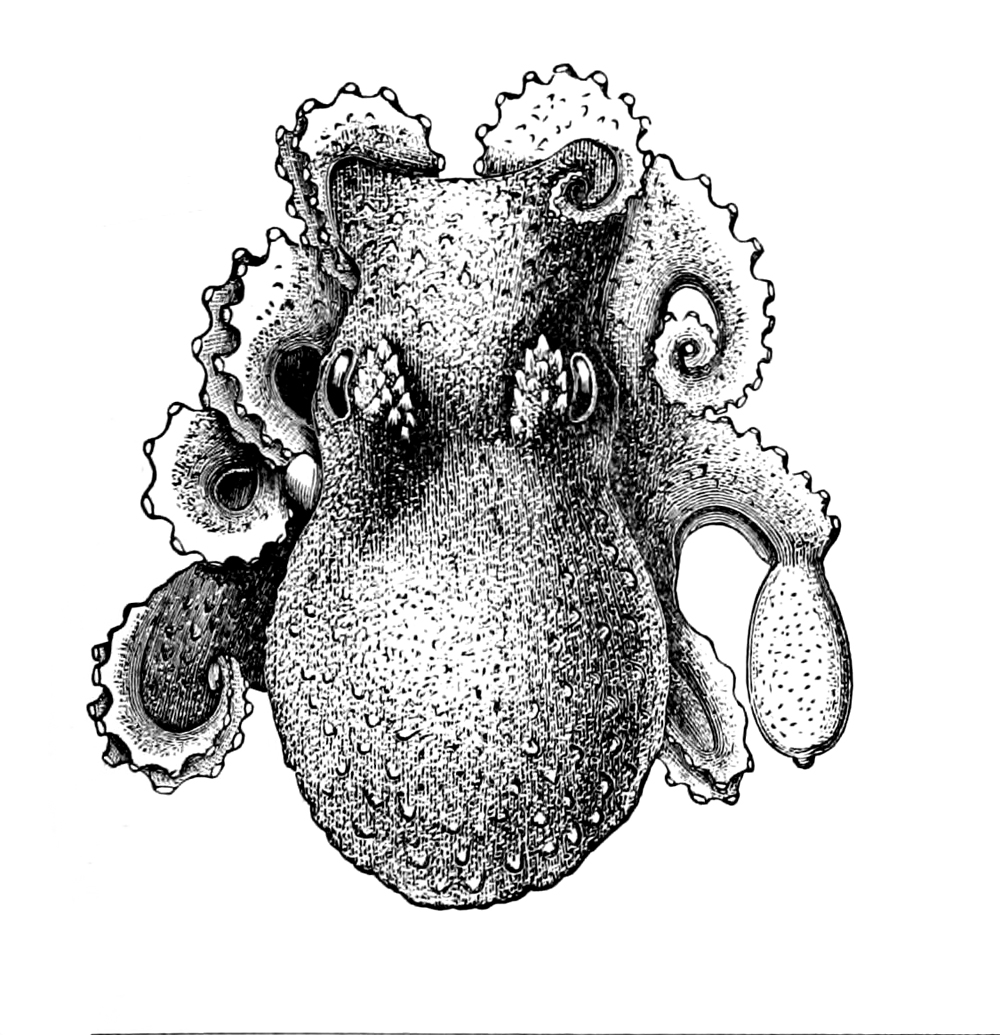
- Dorsal view

Conservation status
- Least Concern (IUCN 3.1)

Scientific classification
- Kingdom: Animalia
- Phylum: Mollusca
- Class: Cephalopoda
- Order: Octopoda
- Family: Bathypolypodidae
- Genus: Bathypolypus
- Species: B. arcticus

Binomial name
- Bathypolypus arcticus (Prosch, 1847)

Synonyms
- Sepia groenlandica Dewhurst, 1834; Bathypolypus lentus (Verrill, 1880); Bathylpous obesus (Verrill, 1880); Octopus arcticus Prosch, 1847; Octopus bairdii Verrill, 1873; Octopus lentus Verrill, 1880; Octopus obesus Verrill, 1880; Polypus arcticus (Prosch, 1847)

= Bathypolypus arcticus =

Species of octopus of the North Atlantic

Bathypolypus arcticus, the North Atlantic octopus, deep sea octopus or spoonarm octopus is a small species of demersal octopus of the North Atlantic. It is usually found at depths of 200 to 600 m (660–1,970 ft) where the temperature is between 2 and 6 °C (36–43 °F).

== Description ==
Bathypolypus arcticus is a small, short-armed octopus which is between 6 and 10 cm (2.4–3.9 in) in length, with an average adult weight of around 45 g (1.6 oz) and a maximum of 300 g (11 oz).

Like other deep-sea octopuses, Bathypolypus arcticus do not have ink sacs.

The mantle is globular, being nearly as wide as it is long. The surface of mantle, head, arms and web is covered in warts, especially around the eyes. The arms are short and in an irregular order with two rows of small suckers.

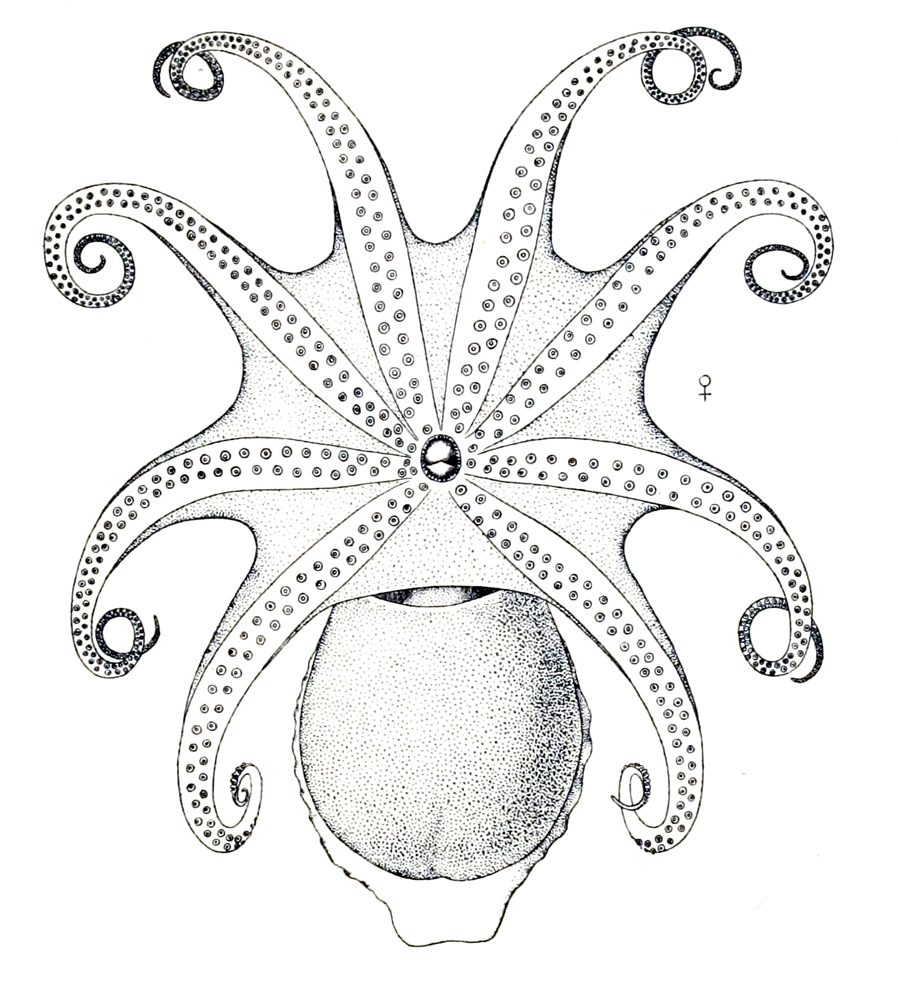
Ventral view

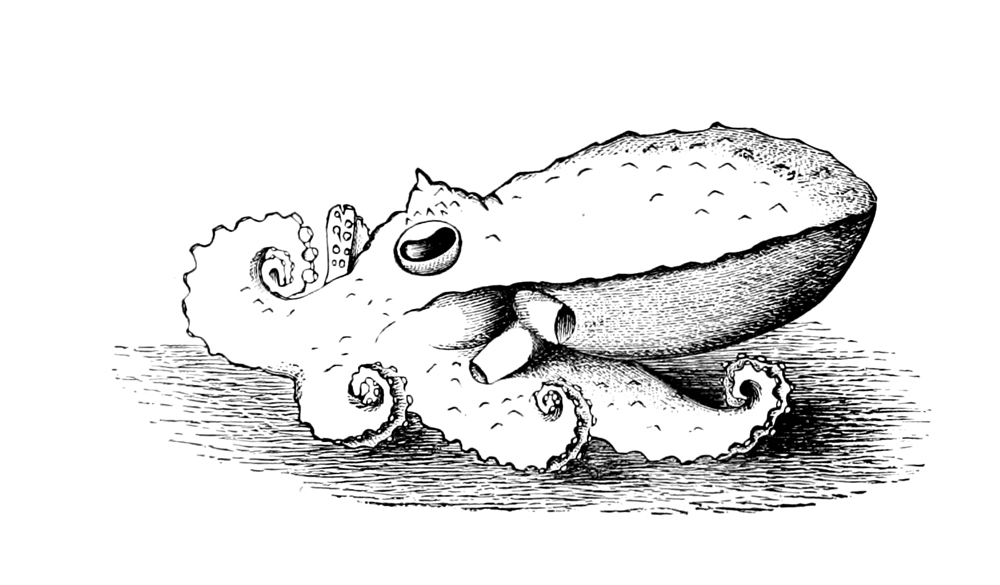
Side view

== Ecology ==
Bathypolypus arcticus has low fecundity meaning that they lay fewer, relatively larger eggs than many other octopuses from which benthic young hatch. The female broods her eggs for over 400 days during which time it ceases to eat and slowly wastes away as it metabolises its own body to provide energy to guard the eggs and young. This was considered the longest brooding period for an octopus until surpassed by Graneledone boreopacifica.

Unusually for octopuses, Bathypolypus arcticus mainly feeds on brittle stars, but this may depend on availability, as captives prefer crustaceans. A wide range of other food items have been recorded in smaller quantities, including polychaetes, sipunculid worms, foraminiferas and bivalves. In captivity, adults have been housed together without showing the aggressive, cannibalistic tendencies known from several other octopuses.

Bathypolypus arcticus have longer life spans than other octopuses where it is known and may live for six years or more. In comparison, many shallow water octopuses only live for a year. Higher water temperatures result in increased growth rates, but shorter life spans in Bathypolypus arcticus. Temperatures above 10 °C (50 °F) are typically lethal to this cold-water species, although specimens have survived at 11 °C (52 °F) if slowly acclimated.

Bathypolypus arcticus is the host for the dicyemid parasite Dicyemennea canadensis, which lives in the renal appendage of the infected octopus.

== Distribution ==
The North Atlantic from the Florida Straits, north along the eastern seaboard to Greenland, Iceland, Spitsbergen then south along the European coast into the North Sea, including Great Britain and Ireland. Although mainly found between 200 and 600 m (660–1,970 ft), it has been recorded in shallower waters and as deep as 1,543 m (5,062 ft).
