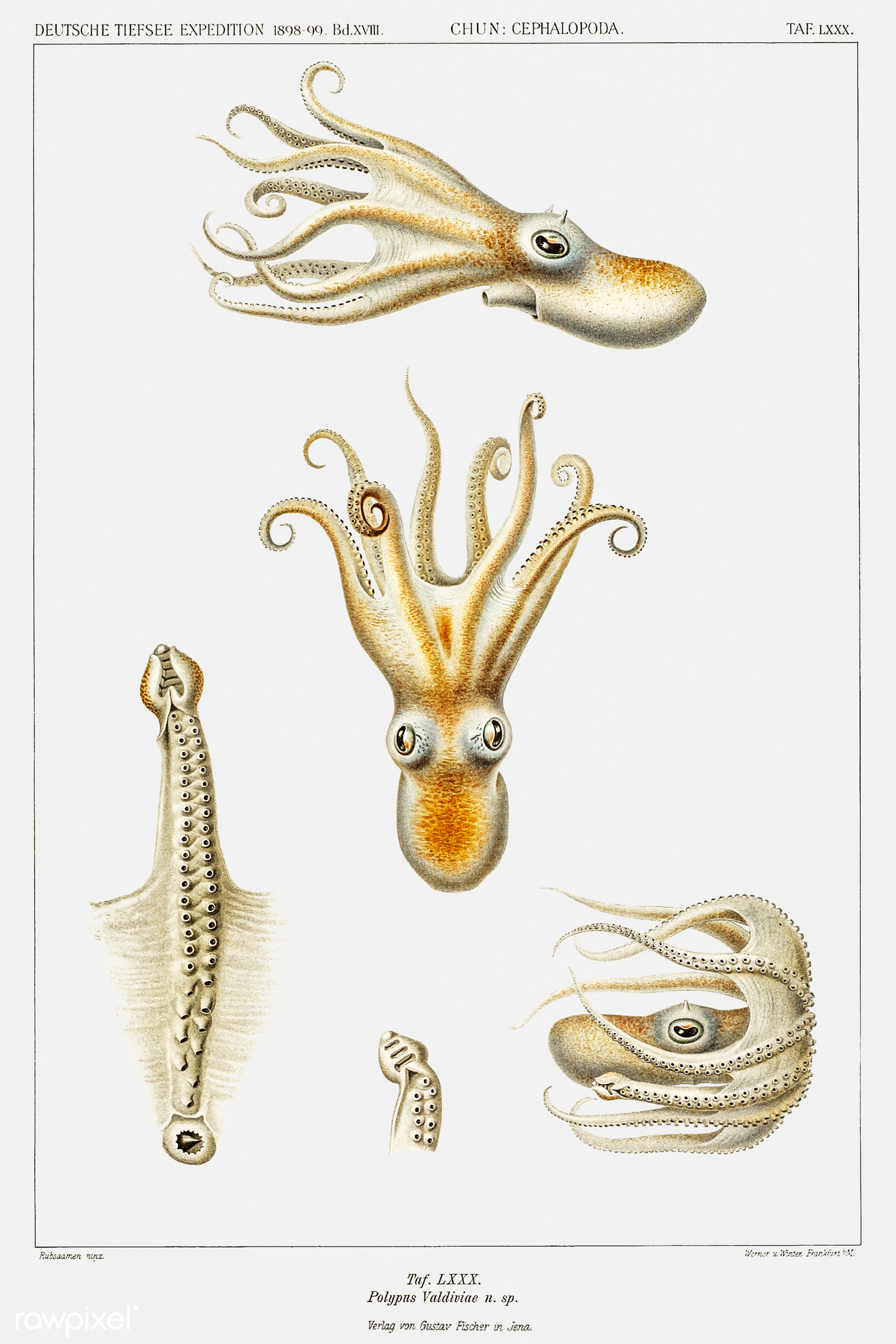
- Illustration of related species Bathypolypus valdiviae, from "Die Cephalopoden" (1910–1915) by Carl Chun

Conservation status
- Least Concern (IUCN 3.1)

Scientific classification
- Kingdom: Animalia
- Phylum: Mollusca
- Class: Cephalopoda
- Order: Octopoda
- Family: Bathypolypodidae
- Genus: Bathypolypus
- Species: B. sponsalis

Binomial name
- Bathypolypus sponsalis (P. Fischer & H. Fischer, 1892)

Synonyms
- Octopus sponsalis P. Fischer & H. Fischer, 1892

= Bathypolypus sponsalis =

Species of mollusc

Bathypolypus sponsalis, commonly called the globose octopus, is a deep sea cephalopod that can be found in both the eastern Atlantic Ocean and the Mediterranean Sea. It possesses many morphological traits adapted to a deep sea environment, including large eggs, reduced gills, no ink sac, and subgelatinous tissues. A distinguishing factor are the relatively large reproductive organs. Their diet consists of predominantly crustaceans and molluscs, but they sometimes consume fish as well. Bathypolypus sponsalis usually dies quickly after reproduction and only spawns once in their lifetime. Sexually mature females have a mantle length of at least 34 mm and sexually mature males have a mantle length of about 24 mm. Juveniles are white and transition to dark brown then to dark purple once maturity is reached.

== Range and habitat ==
Bathypolypus sponsalis are found in areas ranging from the eastern Atlantic Ocean all the way to the Mediterranean Sea. They typically reside in the deep-sea at depths ranging from 200 meters to 1835 meters, however, they are most commonly found between 400 meters to 700 meters, which is considered to be the bathybenthic zone of the deep-sea. Predominantly residing in the benthic and demersal deep-sea communities, they also inhabit the upper slope, lower slope, and abyssal plains. Within their habitats, they resided in water temperatures of 12 °C and a salinity ranging from 38.40 to 38.50 parts per thousand. Bathypolypus sponsalis resides in habitats that contain rocky bottoms in order to yield for stable and safe environments in order to spawn. Females of this species were mainly found in the west and males were found in the eastern portions of the Atlantic Ocean and the Mediterranean Sea.

== Diet ==
The diet of Bathypolypus sponsalis consists mostly of crustaceans and molluscs with the occasional bony fish. On examining the stomach contents, about 76% contained crustaceans and about 49% molluscs, with bony fish only appearing in about 6% of the stomachs. About 37% of the individuals examined had empty stomachs, which may indicate that food sources in their habitat are few and far between.

== Life cycle ==
The species plays an important role in its ecosystem because it serves as both predator and prey in its habitat. Because they reside in benthic habitats, they rely a lot on the resources that they can find in that region, however they frequently undergo vertical migration in order to have access to pelagic prey that are found in other areas of the water column. The larger organisms of the species were found at shallower depths than the smaller members of the species which indicates that the juveniles remain at deeper depths and then gradually throughout their life they move to shallower depths. One of the biggest triggers that initiates sexual maturation of females is mating behavior displayed by the males. During the early stages of their lifecycle, the Bathypolypus sponsalis hatches into planktonic organisms that float in the water column until they eventually mature and become adults that reside in benthic habitats on the sea floor.

=== Reproduction ===
Bathypolypus sponsalis have very large eggs and spermatophores in order to cope with living in a benthic deep-sea environment. Specifically the size of a mature egg at maximum was greater than 15 mm and the oviducal gland was greater than 11 mm, which indicates a synchronous ovulation in that species which then leads to a simultaneous terminal spawning strategy. Not only are the eggs large, they are also rich in yolk which aids in increasing the larval survival. During the reproductive stage of a female's life, she displays solitary behavior in order to prepare a den. This solitary behavior not only provides a place for the eggs to be safe, it also reduces the risk of predation and fishing activities to the female. Bathypolypus sponsalis has a reproductive period that lasts from April to November. In order to attract a mate, males often put on different displays. In order to reproduce, the male fertilizes the female by grasping onto her and then he proceeds to insert his hectocotylus into the mantle cavity of the female. After they mate, both the male and the females usually die after spawning and brooding.

== Adaptations ==
The species has many different adaptations to enable it to live in the deep sea. One of these adaptations is that they lack an ink sac because this organ costs energy that is not necessary for the octopus to spend because being able to produce an ink cloud is not a very good defense mechanism in an environment where light is absent. Other deep sea adaptations are the reduction of gills, which occurs in deep-sea environments because of the decrease in metabolic activity due to the cold temperature of the water in that ecosystem.; and large eggs, since the young hatch with no or a very brief planktonic stage which in turn limits their geographical distribution. The species also has subgelatinous tissues which reduce metabolic requirements by replacing energetically costly muscle tissue.

== Predators ==
There are many different organisms in the ocean that eat cephalopods including sharks, seals, dolphins, and some bony fish. Of these various predators, the species that is the largest threat to the Bathypolypus sponsalis are Mediterranean monk seals, indicating that these predators have the ability to dive sufficiently deep to prey on these molluscs.
