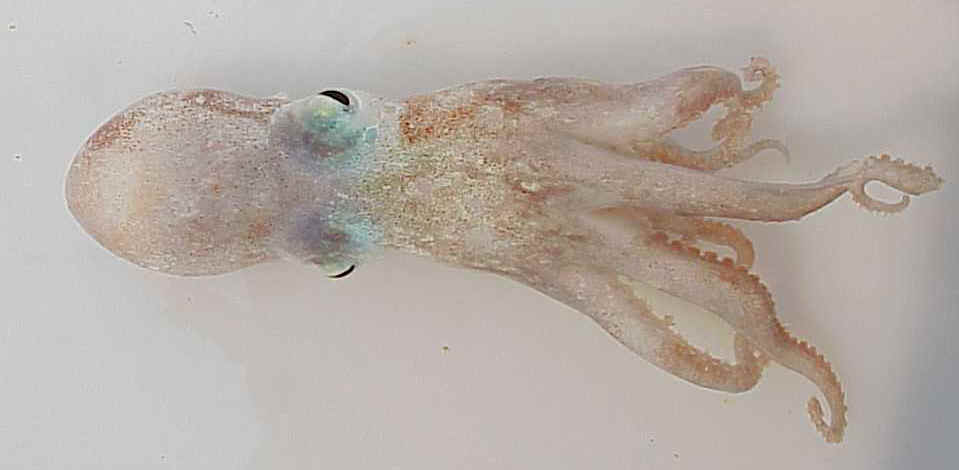

Conservation status
- Least Concern (IUCN 3.1)

Scientific classification
- Kingdom: Animalia
- Phylum: Mollusca
- Class: Cephalopoda
- Order: Octopoda
- Family: Bathypolypodidae
- Genus: Bathypolypus
- Species: B. valdiviae

Binomial name
- Bathypolypus valdiviae (Thiele, in Chun, 1915)

Synonyms
- Bathypolypus grimpei Robson, 1924

= Bathypolypus valdiviae =

Species of mollusc

Bathypolypus valdiviae, common name the boxer octopus or Valdivia bathyal octopus, is a species of octopus in the family Bathypolypodidae. It is endemic to the south Atlantic off southern Africa below a depth of 500 metres (1,600 ft) where it was one of the most commonly sampled cephalopods, taken mainly from the sea bed. The specific name commemorates the SS Valdivia the steamship used on the Valdivia Expedition of 1898-1899 and which was led by Carl Chun.

Per a 2021 study, geographic distribution of the species was expanded to waters off Guinea–Bissau.
