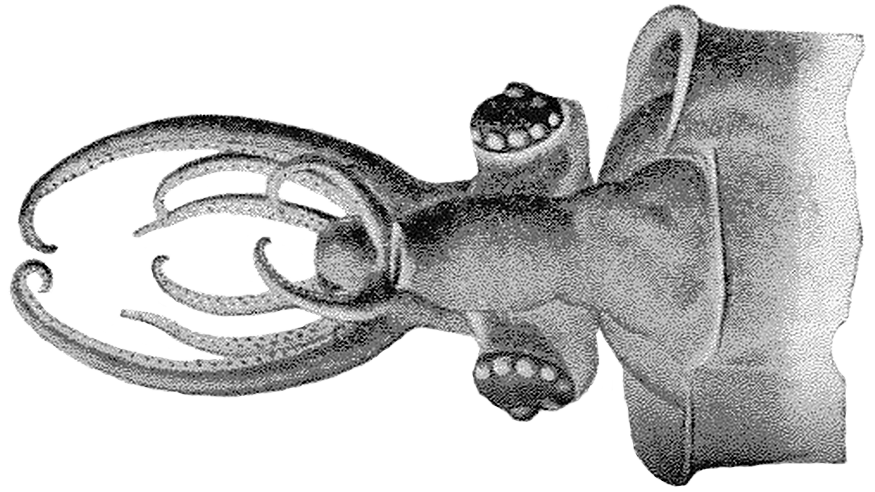
- Leachia cyclura

Scientific classification
- Domain: Eukaryota
- Kingdom: Animalia
- Phylum: Mollusca
- Class: Cephalopoda
- Order: Oegopsida
- Family: Cranchiidae
- Subfamily: Cranchiinae
- Genus: Leachia; Lesueur, 1821

Type species
- Leachia cyclura Lesueur, 1821

Species
- Leachia atlantica (Degner, 1925); Leachia cyclura Lesueur, 1821; Leachia danae (Joubin, 1931); Leachia dislocata Young, 1972; Leachia ellipsoptera (Adams & Reeve, 1848); Leachia lemur (Berry, 1920); Leachia pacifica (Issel, 1908); Leachia rynchophorus (Rochebrune, 1884)

Synonyms
- Drechselia Joubin, 1931; Dyctydiopsis Rochebrune, 1884; Perothis Rathke, 1835; Pyrgopsis Rochebrune, 1884

= Leachia =

Genus of squids

Leachia is a genus containing eight species of glass squids. The genus was formerly divided into two subgenera: Leachia and Pyrgopsis, but is no longer.

Members of this genus live in tropical and sub-tropical waters worldwide.

== Description ==
The mantle is up to 20 cm long in the largest species. Leachia are characterised by the presence of two parallel ridges bearing raised cartilage spikes, which run along the underside of the body near the head. They have large round fins, which often constitute 20–30% of the entire mantle length. Like most glass squids, members of this genus possess a ring of light organs around their eyes. Bioluminescent cells produce light that cancels the shadow cast by their large eyes. Typical of cranchiid squids, juvenile Leachia species have stalked eyes. As they mature, females develop light organs on the ends of their third arm pairs. These are thought to be used in mating displays to attract males.

== Species ==
- Leachia atlantica - Eastern North Atlantic
- Leachia cyclura - South Indian Ocean
- Leachia danae (Joubin, 1931) - Gulf of Panama
- Leachia dislocata (Young, 1972) - Eastern Temperate Pacific.
- Leachia lemur - Western North Atlantic
- Leachia pacifica - South Pacific

Six species are considered valid by Voss, et al. (1992), who suggests there are 5 more that remain undescribed:

- Leachia spp. A - Western South Atlantic
