= Leachia pacifica =

Conservation status
- Data Deficient (IUCN 3.1)

Scientific classification
- Kingdom: Animalia
- Phylum: Mollusca
- Class: Cephalopoda
- Order: Oegopsida
- Family: Cranchiidae
- Genus: Leachia
- Species: L. pacifica

Binomial name
- Leachia pacifica (Issel, 1908)

Species of squid

Leachia pacifica is a species of squid in the family Cranchiidae., first described by Arturo Issel in 1908. It is mainly found in the Subtropics. No subspecies are listed in the Catalogue of Life.
