= Leachia atlantica =

Conservation status
- Data Deficient (IUCN 3.1)

Scientific classification
- Kingdom: Animalia
- Phylum: Mollusca
- Class: Cephalopoda
- Order: Oegopsida
- Family: Cranchiidae
- Genus: Leachia
- Species: L. atlantica

Binomial name
- Leachia atlantica (Degner, 1925)

Species of glass squid

Leachia atlantica, also known as the Atlantic cranch squid, is a species of squid belonging to the subfamily Cranchiinae.

They live in the Atlantic ocean in bathypelagic regions at depth between 0-2000 meters.
