= Leachia danae =

Conservation status
- Least Concern (IUCN 3.1)

Scientific classification
- Kingdom: Animalia
- Phylum: Mollusca
- Class: Cephalopoda
- Order: Oegopsida
- Family: Cranchiidae
- Genus: Leachia
- Species: L. danae

Binomial name
- Leachia danae (Joubin, 1931)

Synonyms
- Drechselia danae Joubin, 1931

Species of squid

Leachia danae is a species of glass squid first described in 1931 in the Eastern tropical Pacific Ocean. It has since also been observed off the Mexican Pacific coast.
