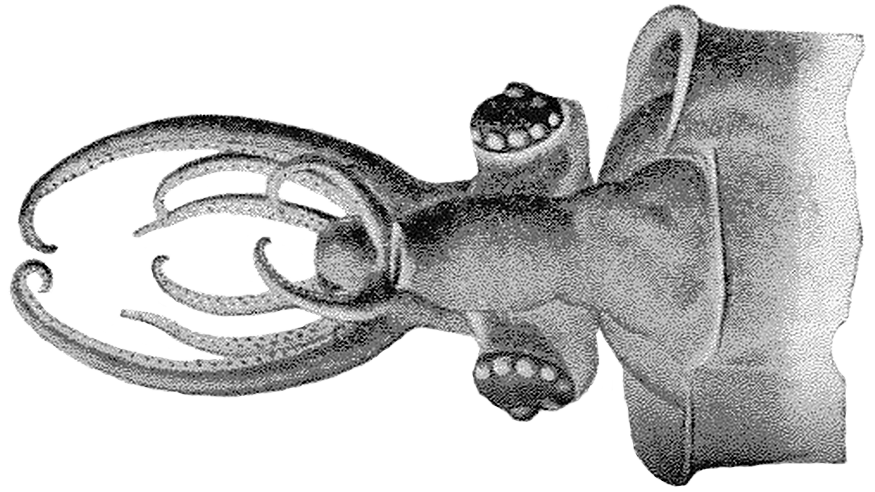

Conservation status
- Data Deficient (IUCN 3.1)

Scientific classification
- Kingdom: Animalia
- Phylum: Mollusca
- Class: Cephalopoda
- Order: Oegopsida
- Family: Cranchiidae
- Genus: Leachia
- Species: L. cyclura

Binomial name
- Leachia cyclura Lesueur, 1821

= Leachia cyclura =

Species of cephalopod

Leachia cyclura is a species of cephalopods belonging to the family Cranchiidae.

The species is found in Northern America.
