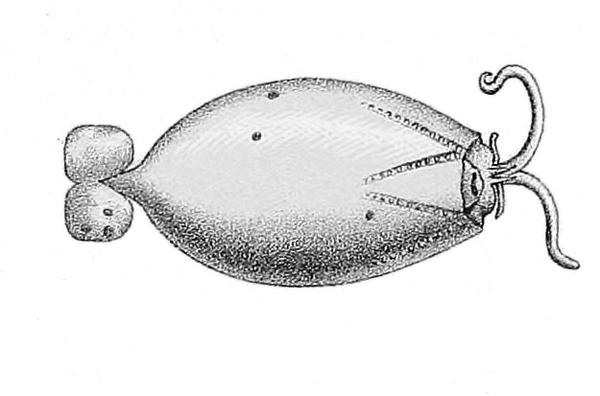
- Drawing by A. Pollock from Report on the Cephalopoda collected by H. M. S. Challenger during the years 1873-76

Conservation status
- Least Concern (IUCN 3.1)

Scientific classification
- Kingdom: Animalia
- Phylum: Mollusca
- Class: Cephalopoda
- Order: Oegopsida
- Family: Cranchiidae
- Genus: Liocranchia
- Species: L. reinhardti

Binomial name
- Liocranchia reinhardti (Steenstrup, 1856)

Synonyms
- Fusocranchia alpha Joubin, 1920; Leachia reinhardti Steenstrup, 1856; Liocranchia brockii Pfeffer, 1884; Liocranchia elongata Issel, 1908; Liocranchia intermedia Robson, 1924

= Liocranchia reinhardti =

Species of squid

Liocranchia reinhardti is a deep sea squid.

It grows to 150 millimetres (6 inches) long and lives up to 1,000 metres (3,300 feet; 500 fathoms) deep. It is found worldwide in tropical and subtropical waters.
