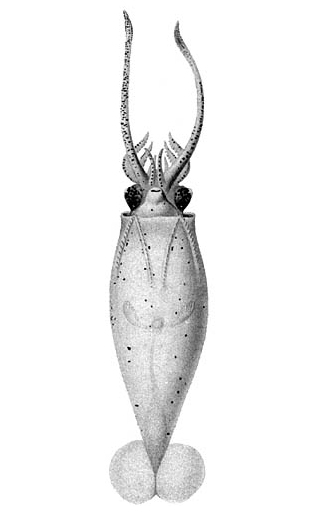
- Liocranchia valdiviae subadult

Scientific classification
- Kingdom: Animalia
- Phylum: Mollusca
- Class: Cephalopoda
- Order: Oegopsida
- Family: Cranchiidae
- Subfamily: Cranchiinae
- Genus: Liocranchia; Pfeffer, 1884

Type species
- Leachia reinhardti Steenstrup, 1856

Species
- see text

Synonyms
- Fusocranchia Joubin, 1920

= Liocranchia =

Genus of squids

Liocranchia is a genus of glass squid from the family Cranchiidae. They are moderate-sized with a long, spindle-shaped mantle which tapers to a point at the rear and they can attain mantle lengths of 250 millimeters (9.8 in). The species in Liocranchia have a cosmopolitan distribution in tropical and subtropical oceans although it has been suggested that one species, Liocranchia reinhardti is associated with land masses. In seas off Hawaii waters, L. reinhardti undergoes vertical migrations while L. valdiviae occurs in deep water and is sedentary. They are eaten by many oceanic predator species.

== Characteristics ==
Liocranchia species are characterised by having two rows of cartilagenous tubercules starting at each funnel-mantle fusion which diverge from each other along their length, each funnel having a valve and a very large ventral pad. The tentacles have duckers and pads in two series on distal 2/3 of tentacle stalk. In the paralarvae the eyes are not mounted on a stalk. The fins merge posterior to gladius and they are almost circular in their combined shape. There are a number of oval photophores on each eye and this varies with species 4 in L. valdiviae and 14 in L. reinhardti. There are also photophores on the tips of arms III in adult or subadult females. The males bear suckers in 2 rows on the middle part of the hectocotylized right or left arm IV.

== Species ==
The genus Liocranchia consists of two valid species and one questionable species:

- Liocranchia gardineri * Robson, 1921
- Liocranchia reinhardti (Steenstrup, 1856)
- Liocranchia valdiviae Chun, 1910

The species listed above with an asterisk (*) is a taxon inquirendum and needs further study to determine if it is a valid species or a synonym.
