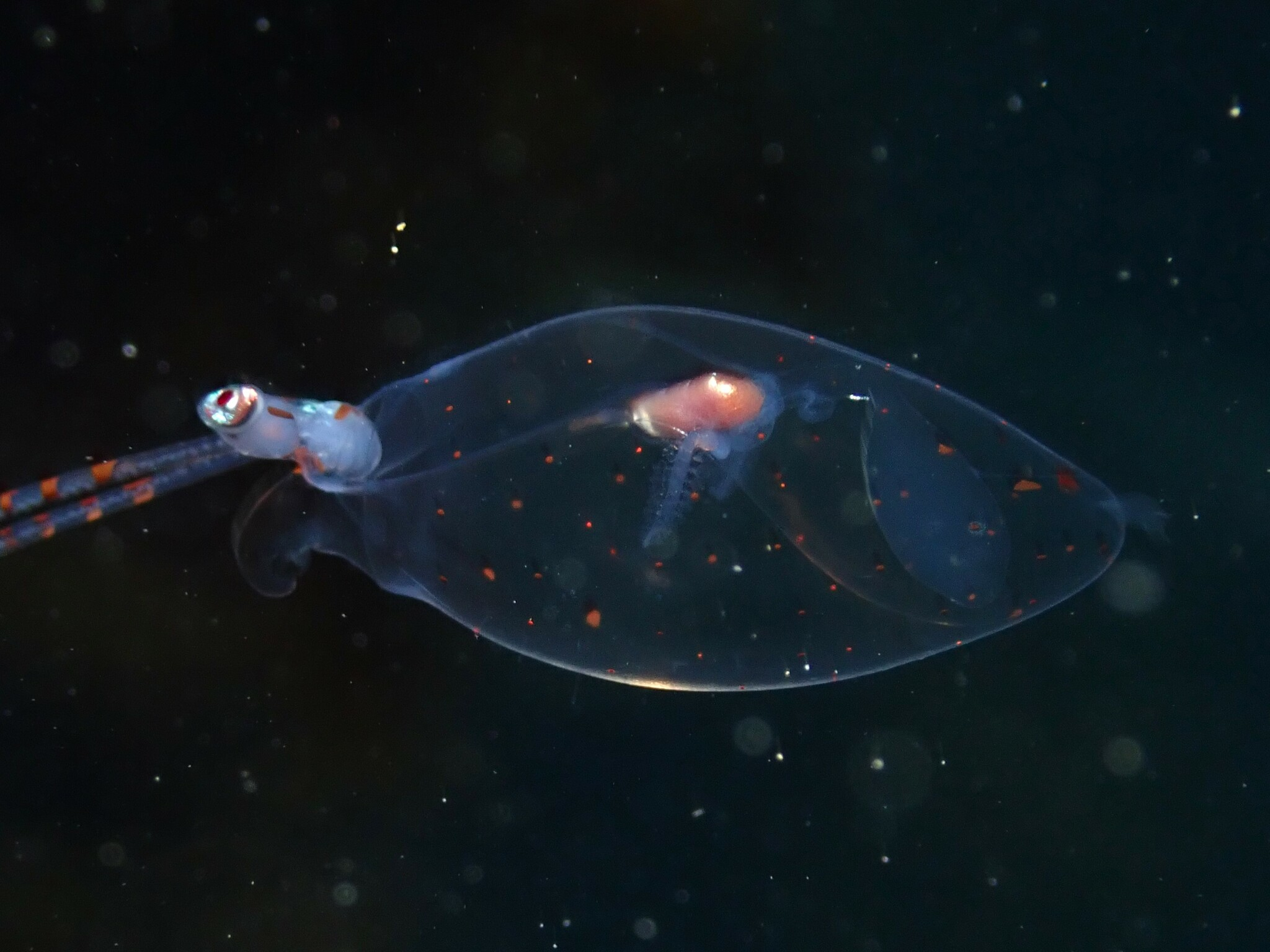

Conservation status
- Least Concern (IUCN 3.1)

Scientific classification
- Kingdom: Animalia
- Phylum: Mollusca
- Class: Cephalopoda
- Order: Oegopsida
- Family: Cranchiidae
- Genus: Teuthowenia
- Species: T. pellucida

Binomial name
- Teuthowenia pellucida (Chun, 1910)

Synonyms
- Anomalocranchia impennis Robson, 1924; Desmoteuthis pellucida Chun, 1910; Megalocranchia richardsoni Dell, 1959

= Teuthowenia pellucida =

Googly-eyed glass squid

Species of squid

Teuthowenia pellucida, the googly-eyed glass squid, is a rare deep-sea glass squid whose habitat ranges throughout the oceans of the Southern Hemisphere.

== Characteristics ==
The googly-eyed glass squid is a blue, transparent organism with a body size of approximately 200 mm (7.9 in) and notably large eyes. Mantle thickness is only a few millimeters. Females are slightly larger than males. The squid has eight short tentacles and a slightly longer pair at the end of its rather swollen body. The only visible internal organ is the digestive gland, similar to the liver of a chordate. As a defense, the squid is able to engorge itself with surrounding water to dramatically increase in size, appearing more intimidating. The squid is also able to escape predators using jet propulsion.

== Habitat ==
Googly-eyed glass squid live consistently along the circumglobal 40° southern parallel, in the Pacific, Atlantic, and Indian Oceans. Immature googly-eyed glass squid are usually found at depths of around 900 m (3,000 ft). Mature squid exist at depths of between 1,600 and 2,400 m (5,200 and 7,900 ft).

== Growth and development ==
Eggs are laid in clusters attached to rocks and plants on the ocean floor. Newly hatched squid develop rapidly into paralarvae. Female squid mature between 150 and 190 mm; males mature at 140 mm. Pregnant females carry between 6,000 and 8,000 eggs with diameters of 2.2 mm. These eggs are often visible through the squid's thin mantle.

== Bioluminescence ==
The cells of a googly-eyed glass squid's eyes and tentacles form small, bioluminescent organs called photophores. These organs release light, making the organism distinguishable among the darkness of the bathyal zone. The use of bioluminescence requires energy in the form of adenosine triphosphate (ATP).

== See also ==
- Teuthowenia megalops
