= Johann Phillip Fabricius =

German missionary and scholar

Johann Philipp Fabricius (22 January 1711 – 23 January 1791) was a German Christian missionary and a Tamil scholar in the later part of his life. He arrived in South India in 1740 to take charge of a small Tamil Lutheran congregation in Madras and expanded it during his stay. During his time in Madras he wrote several Christian hymns in Tamil and published the first Tamil to English Dictionary. Of his works his translation of the Bible to Tamil is considered to be most noteworthy.

== Early life ==
Johann Philipp Fabricius was born on 22 January 1711 in Frankfurt am Main, Germany. He graduated in both law and theology at Universities in Giessen and Halle, Germany.

== Ministry ==
In 1740 Johann Philipp Fabricius arrived in South India to take charge of a small Tamil Lutheran congregation in Madras. After initial setbacks, the congregation grew from 300 to 2,200 members in his 30 years of ministry. Initially the foundations of dubashi infrastructure in South India were laid down by Bartholomäus Ziegenbalg. During the course of 1720 to 1849, around seventy-nine missionaries came to Tranquebar from Europe. Benjamin Schultze and Johann Philipp Fabricius were the most noteworthy among them. Fabricius was Schultze's successor and worked in Vepery from 1740 to 1791.

== Literary contribution ==
An important area of work started initially by Ziegenbalg and then later on taken up by Fabricius was Tamil Christian hymnody. Johann Philipp Fabricius published a collection of 335 Tamil hymns, most of them translated from German. The initial compositions by Ziegenbalg were not very well done and when Fabricius came to Madras he had this field of work entirely to himself and gained quite a mastery over this art. Even today hymns by Fabricius are sung by Christians in South India.

In 1761, British East India Company forces invaded Pondicherry, which was then a French colony, and acquired a printing press. When the spoils of war were brought to Madras the printing press was passed on to Fabricius to aid his missionary work as well as to be used for the East India company's publications. Thus the first printing press in Madras was installed under Fabricius's supervision in 1761. Initially Fabricius had problems with importing paper for his press from Europe, but the problem was sorted out when Indians in Madras started to manufacture their own paper, leading to first paper industry in Madras.

In 1779 he published the first Tamil to English dictionary containing 9000 headwords. This work laid the foundation for his future works in Tamil literature. It was published under the title "A Malabar and English dictionary, wherein the words and phrases of the Tamil Language, commonly called by Europeans the Malabar Language, are explained in English, By the English Missionaries of Madras. Printed at Wepery in the Year M.DCC.LXXIX."

== Bible translation ==
Ziegenbalg had left behind his translations of the Old and the New Testament during his stay in Madras. As he read through the translation along with Muttu, Fabricius realized that changes had to be made to Ziegenbalg's translation. "The four qualities which Fabricius found in the originals were lucidity, strength, brevity and appropriateness; these were sadly lacking in the existing Tamil translation, but he hoped that by the help of God he had been able to restore them."

In 1750 Fabricius finally completed his translation of the New Testament. He was a diligent worker and made sure that he read out his work to a lot of people in order to get their feedback and response.

By 1753 translations of the first epistle of the Corinthians had already begun, much to Fabricius' disappointment. The printing process was also in full sway. At this point Fabricius decided to go back to Tranquebar and work with his colleagues on the Corinthians and Galatians. Fabricius' colleagues immediately realized the superiority of his work and decided to print his translation instead. They held the right to make corrections and suggestions whenever required.

The New Testament which emerged from the Press in 1758 was a peculiar combination; the first seven books had no sign of influence of Fabricius while the rest of the work was entirely the translation done by him. At last in 1766, Fabricius could print his translation of the New Testament from a press that the British government made available to him.

On 18 October 1756 Fabricius decided to focus his attention on the translation of the Old Testament. He recognized that this would be infinitely more difficult because of the Psalms, the Book of Solomon and prophets. During the process of translation, Fabricius had to face a lot of difficulty due to the lack of enough printing paper in Tranquebar. After much effort in 1756 a version of the Psalms was finally printed. However the final translation of the Old Testament was not printed until 1798, almost a decade after Fabricius' death.

The Lutheran churches in South India used Fabricius' translation for a period of over 150 years. The poet Vedanayagam Sastriar paid tribute to this work by calling it "the golden translation of the immortal Fabricius."

== Last days ==
His last days in ministry were clouded by mismanagement of the mission, unsuccessful financial transactions among other failures. In 1778 the missionaries learned that Fabricius had involved himself into quite a complex financial debt due to mismanagement of funds. Fabricius was imprisoned although his friends were allowed to visit him from time to time. At last Gericke, who had taken over his work, was able to secure a release for Fabricius, so that he could spend his last few days in peace. Johann Philipp Fabricius died on 23 January 1791 in Madras.

== See also ==
- Constanzo Beschi
- Christianity in India
- Bartholomäus Ziegenbalg
- Missionaries
