= Ferdinand Victor Alphons Prosch =

- Born: November 25, 1820; Copenhagen
- Died: July 12, 1885 (aged 64); Copenhagen
- Citizenship: Danish
- Scientific career
- Fields: Doctor, Veterinarian, zoologist
- Author abbrev. (zoology): Prosch

Ferdinand Victor Alphons Prosch (November 25, 1820 in Copenhagen – July 29, 1885) was a Danish medical doctor, veterinarian and biologist.

Prosch's father, Johannes Henrik William Prosch (died 1843) was a secretary in the Danish War Chancery and his mother, Caroline Sophie (née Brement) was French. In 1837 Prosch was a student at the Metropolitan School in Copenhagen and by 1843 he had taken his medical exams. Between 1843 and 1846 Prosch was employed by the university as a prosector, i.e. a preparer of specimens for dissection in the university's Zoological museum.

In 1847 he joined the Flaaden as the ship's doctor on a voyage to Madeira. Guinea, Venezuela and the Caribbean. In 1848 he was the ship's doctor on the frigate Havfrue ("Mermaid") in the First Schleswig War. After the war practiced as a doctor in Copenhagen and was a teacher of natural history, in which capacity he published the book "Lærer i Naturhistorie, i hvilken Egenskabin" 1851, which at the time was widely used as a school textbook. He dealt equally diligently with the study of natural history, comparative anatomy and physiology. His scientific reputation was such that in 1852 he gained a teaching post in hygiene studies at Veterinary and Agricultural University, where in 1858 he was appointed associate professor of Dietetics and Animal Husbandry, being promoted to professor a year later. he made several journeys abroad to study German and English breeds of farm animals and he was to have a significant impact on Danish agriculture in the late 19th century. He was the author and co-author of many text books, articles and papers on animal health and wellbeing. He was a Knight of the Danneborg, a Danish honour similar to the Order of the British Empire.

== Some Taxa named by Prosch ==
- Bathypolypus arcticus (Prosch 1847)
- Cranchiidae (Prosch 1847)
- Teuthowenia megalops (Prosch 1849)
