= Arturo Issel =

Italian geologist, palaeontologist, malacologist and archaeologist

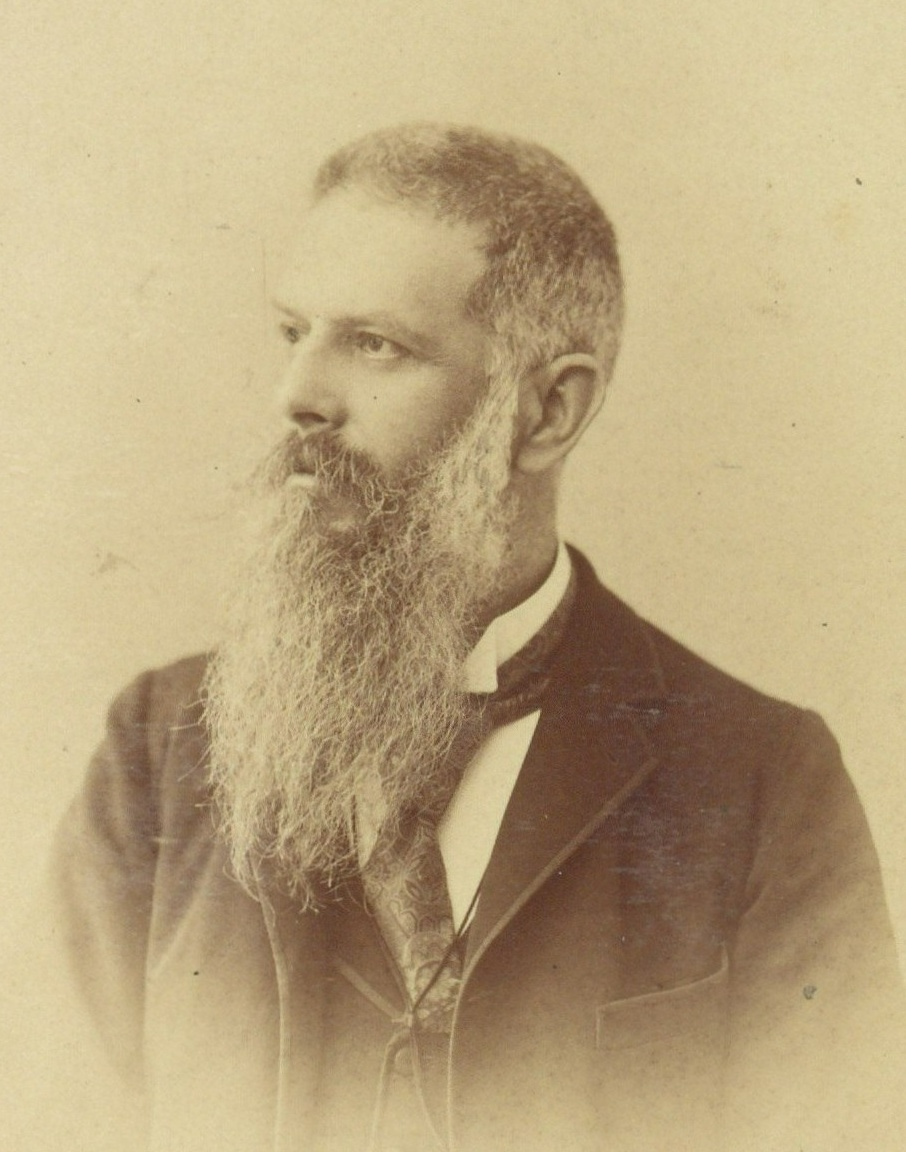
- Born: April 11, 1842; Genoa
- Died: November 27, 1922 (aged 80); Genoa

Arturo Issel (Genoa April 11, 1842 – Genoa November 27, 1922) was an Italian geologist, palaeontologist, malacologist and archaeologist, born in Genoa. He is noted for first defining the Tyrrhenian Stage in 1914. Issel was also renowned at the time for his work on codifying information within anthropology and ethnology, for which he is still remembered.

In 1865, he was searching for the presence of Neanderthal man in Malta. During one of his excursions in Dalam Valley (Wied Dalam), he came across a cave, Għar Dalam, half filled with soil and used as a cattle-pen. Issel thought that an excavation at the site could prove fruitful. He dug a trench in the cave’s loose soil and found prehistoric human remains (from approximately 5000 to 4100 BC), and a burnt hippopotamus bone.

Issel participated in several expeditions to East Africa, including one led by Orazio Antinori and Odoardo Beccari in 1870. He was appointed professor of Geology at the University of Genova in 1866. Issel was a close correspondent with anthropologist Elio Modigliani, and helped promulgate Modigliani's ideas. Issel's son, Raffaele Issel, followed in his footsteps and was appointed professor of zoology at the University of Genova in 1923.

The Issel Bridge, an undersea ridge separating parts of the Tyrrhenian Sea, and the Issel Seamount were named in Arturo Issel's honor. The mineral isselite is also named in his honor.

== Bibliography ==
- Issel A. (1874). Molluschi Borneensi. Genova, Tipografia del R. Instituto Sordo-Muti
- Issel A. (1869). Malacologia del Mar Rosso. Ricerche zoologiche e paleontologiche. Pisa, pp. I-XI, 1-387, Plates I-V
- Giglioli E. H. & Issel A. (1884). Pelagos, saggi sulla vita e sui prodotti del mare. Genova, Tipografia del R. Istituto de' Sordo-Muti
