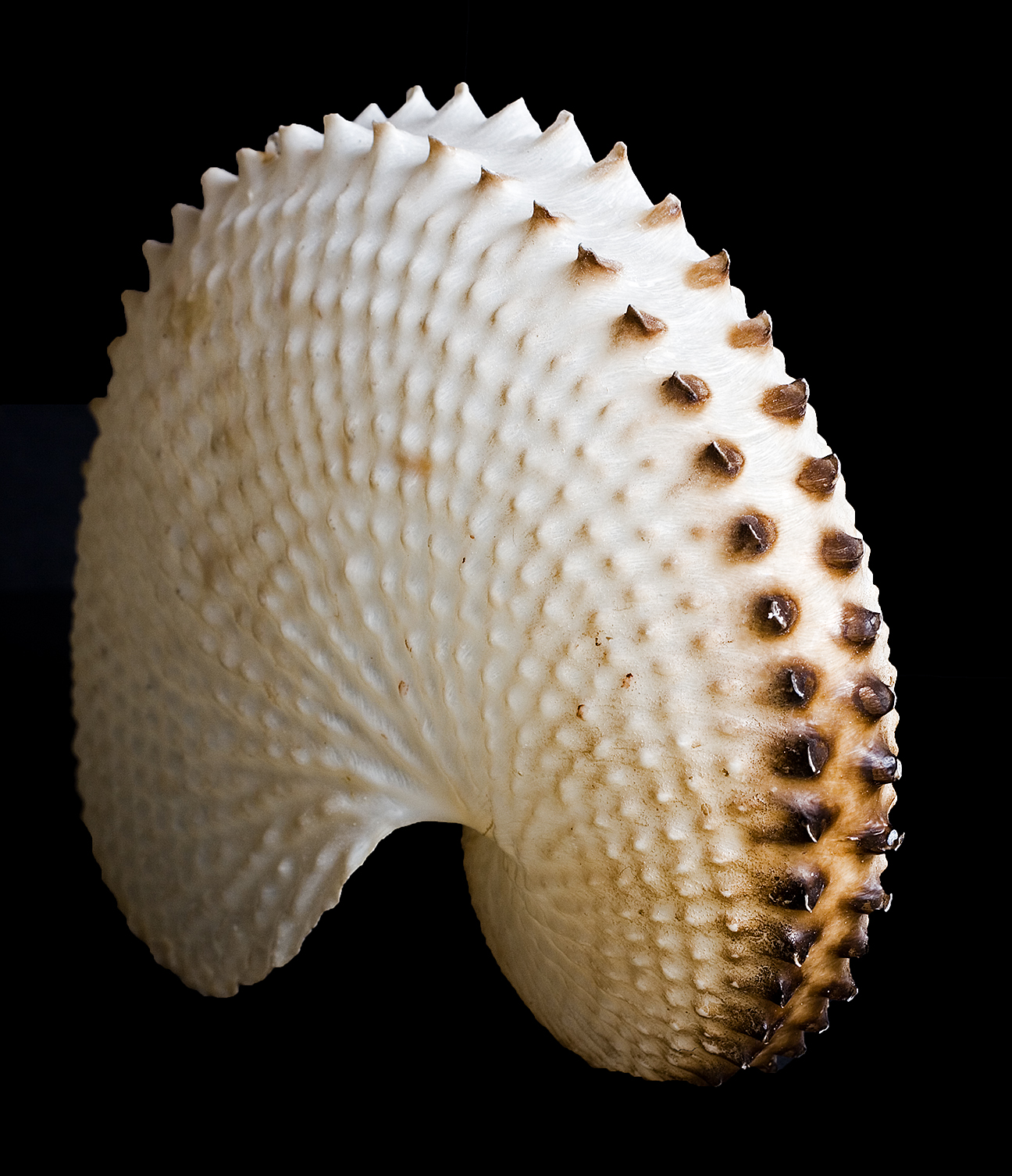
- Eggcase of Argonauta nodosa, showing the derived double keel of the genus

Scientific classification
- Kingdom: Animalia
- Phylum: Mollusca
- Class: Cephalopoda
- Order: Octopoda
- Suborder: Incirrata
- Superfamily: Argonautoidea; Cantraine, 1841

= Argonautoidea =

Superfamily of octopuses

Argonautoidea is a superfamily of the suborder Incirrata containing all known argonautoids.

== Classification ==
Radular teeth of argonautoids

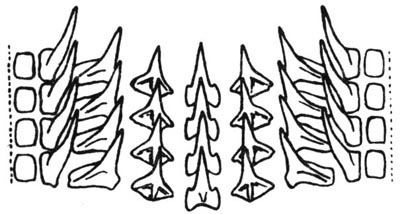
Argonauta argo

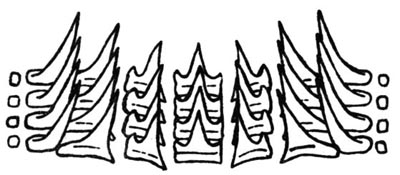
Ocythoe tuberculata

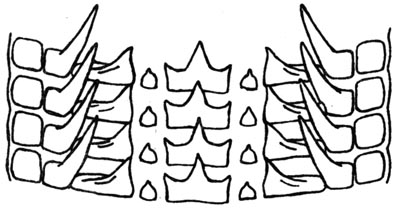
Tremoctopus violaceus

- Class Cephalopoda
  - Subclass Nautiloidea: nautiluses
  - Subclass †Ammonoidea: ammonites
  - Subclass Coleoidea
    - Superorder Decapodiformes: squid, cuttlefish
    - Superorder Octopodiformes
      - Family †Trachyteuthididae (incertae sedis)
      - Order Vampyromorphida: vampire squid
      - Order Octopoda
        - Genus †Keuppia (incertae sedis)
        - Genus †Palaeoctopus (incertae sedis)
        - Genus †Proteroctopus (incertae sedis)
        - Genus †Styletoctopus (incertae sedis)
        - Suborder Cirrina: finned deep-sea octopuses
        - Suborder Incirrata
          - Superfamily Argonautoidea
            - Family Alloposidae: the seven-arm octopus
            - Family Argonautidae: argonauts (paper nautiluses)
            - Family Ocythoidae: the tuberculate pelagic octopus
            - Family Tremoctopodidae: blanket octopuses
          - Superfamily Octopodoidea

== Image gallery of families ==
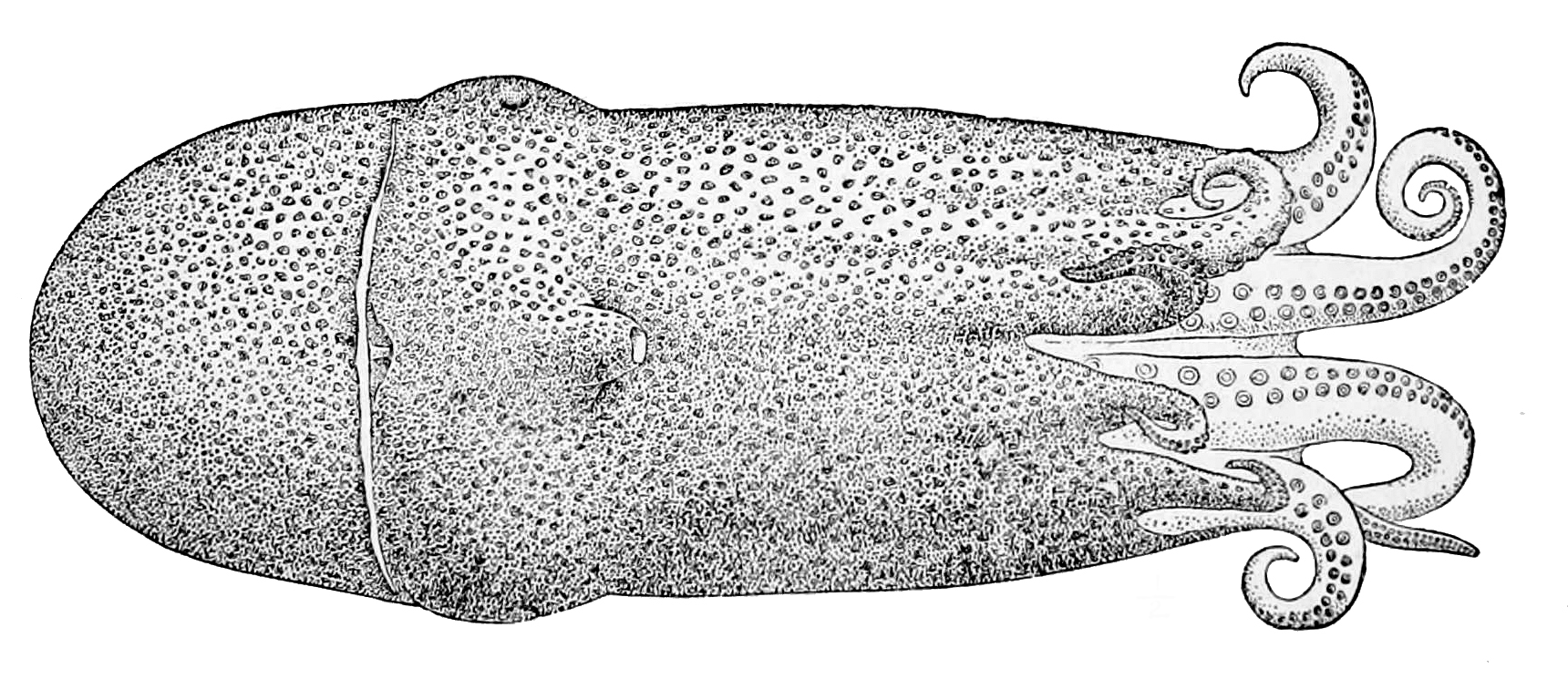
A young female Haliphron atlanticus (Family Alloposidae)

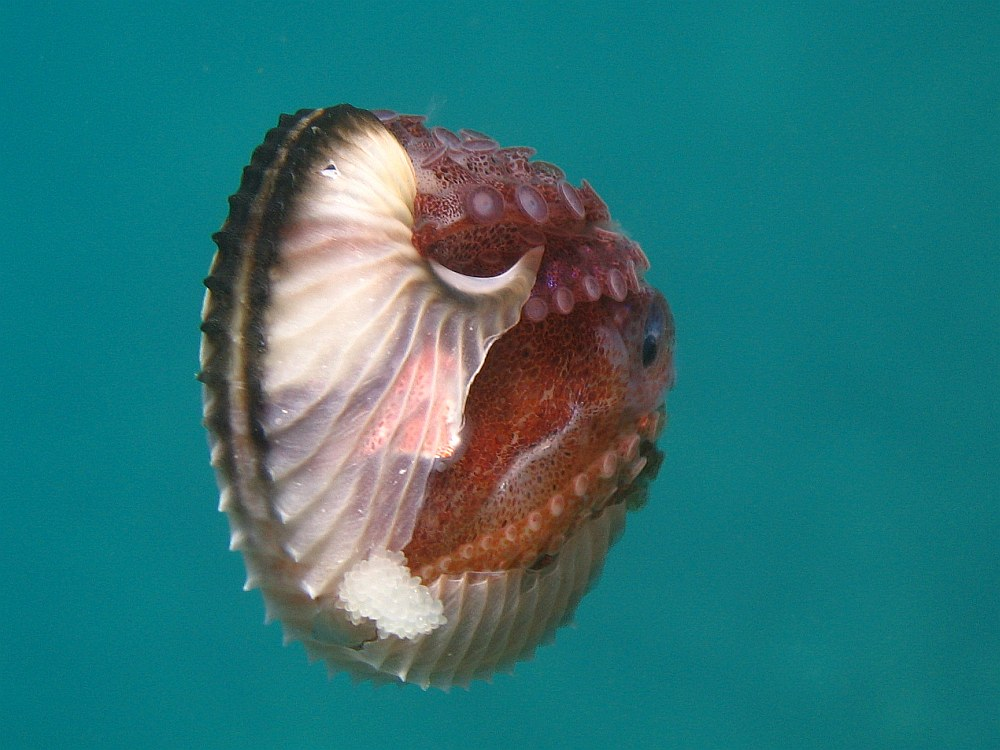
Female Argonauta argo with damaged egg case and eggs (Family Argonautidae)

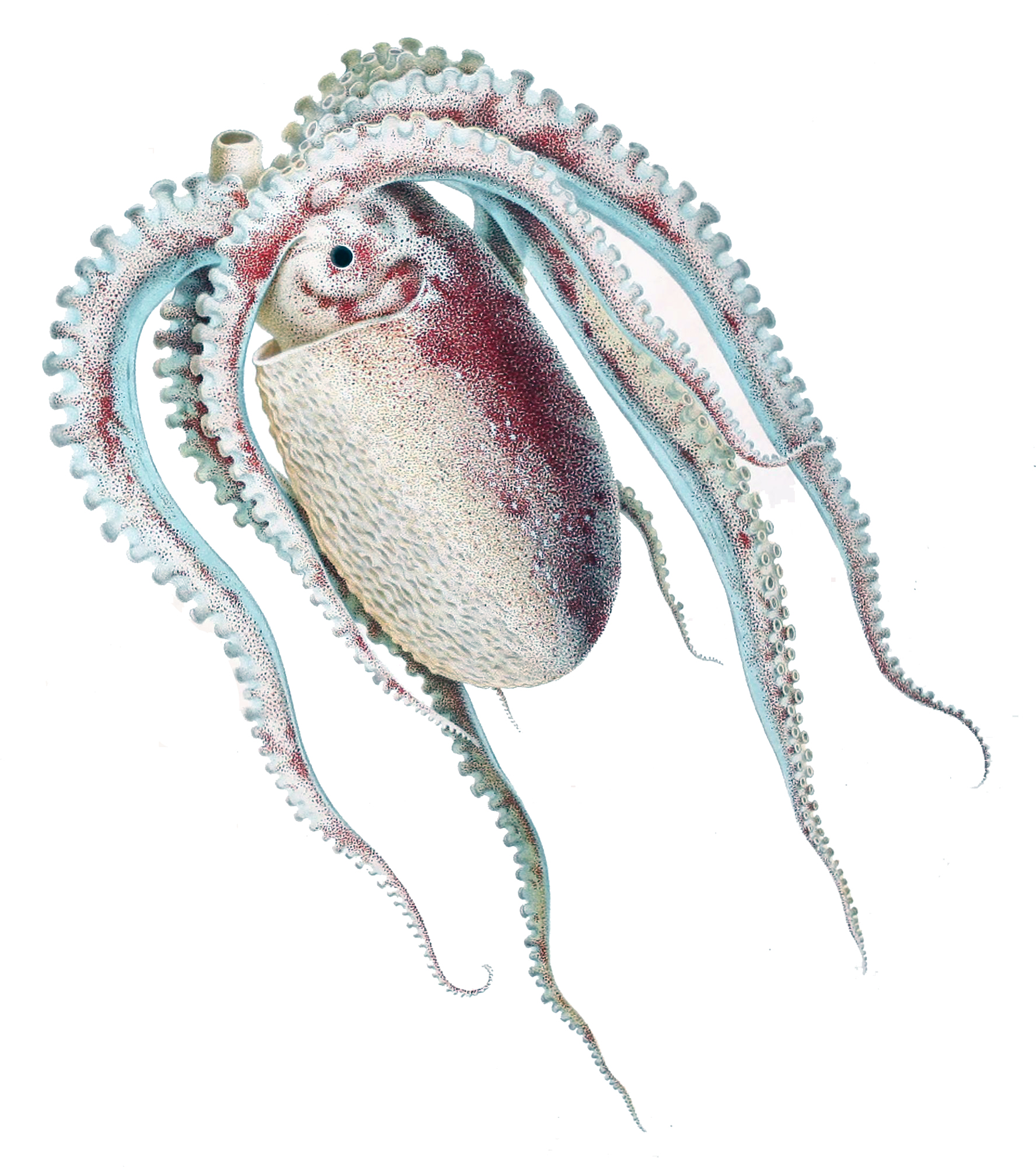
Ocythoe tuberculata (Family Ocythoidae)

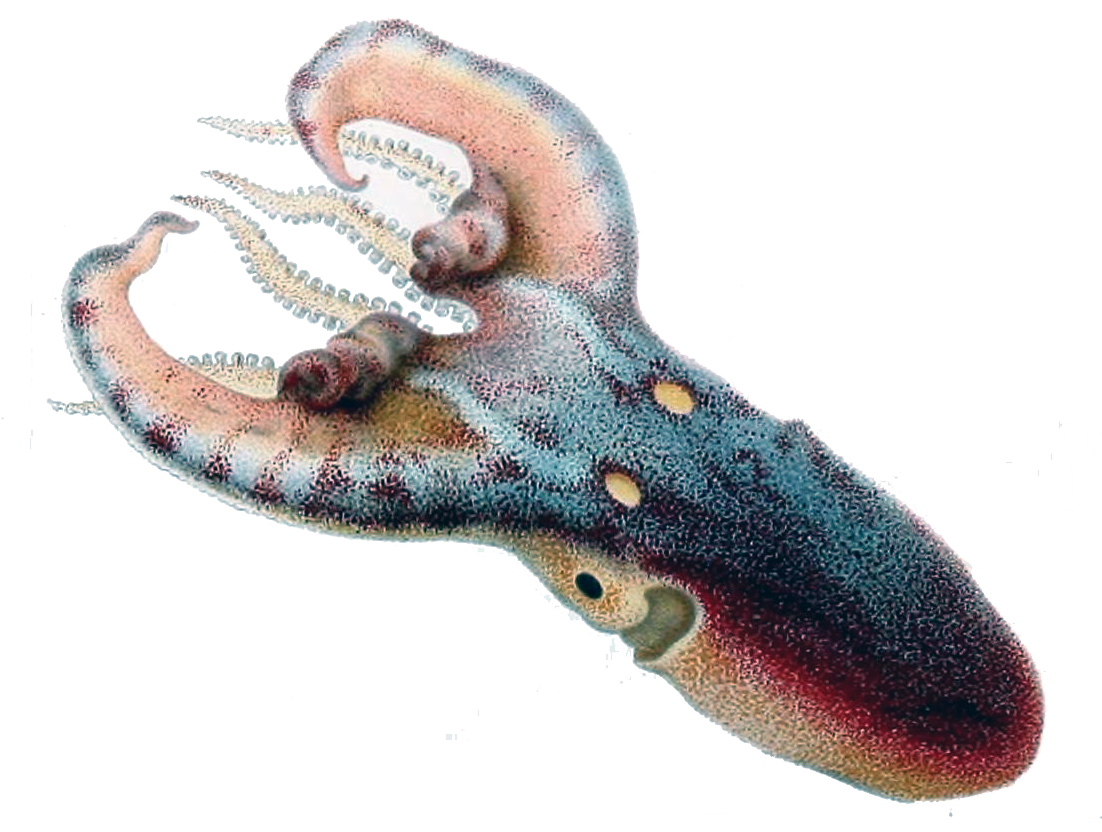
Tremoctopus violaceus (Family Tremoctopodidae)
