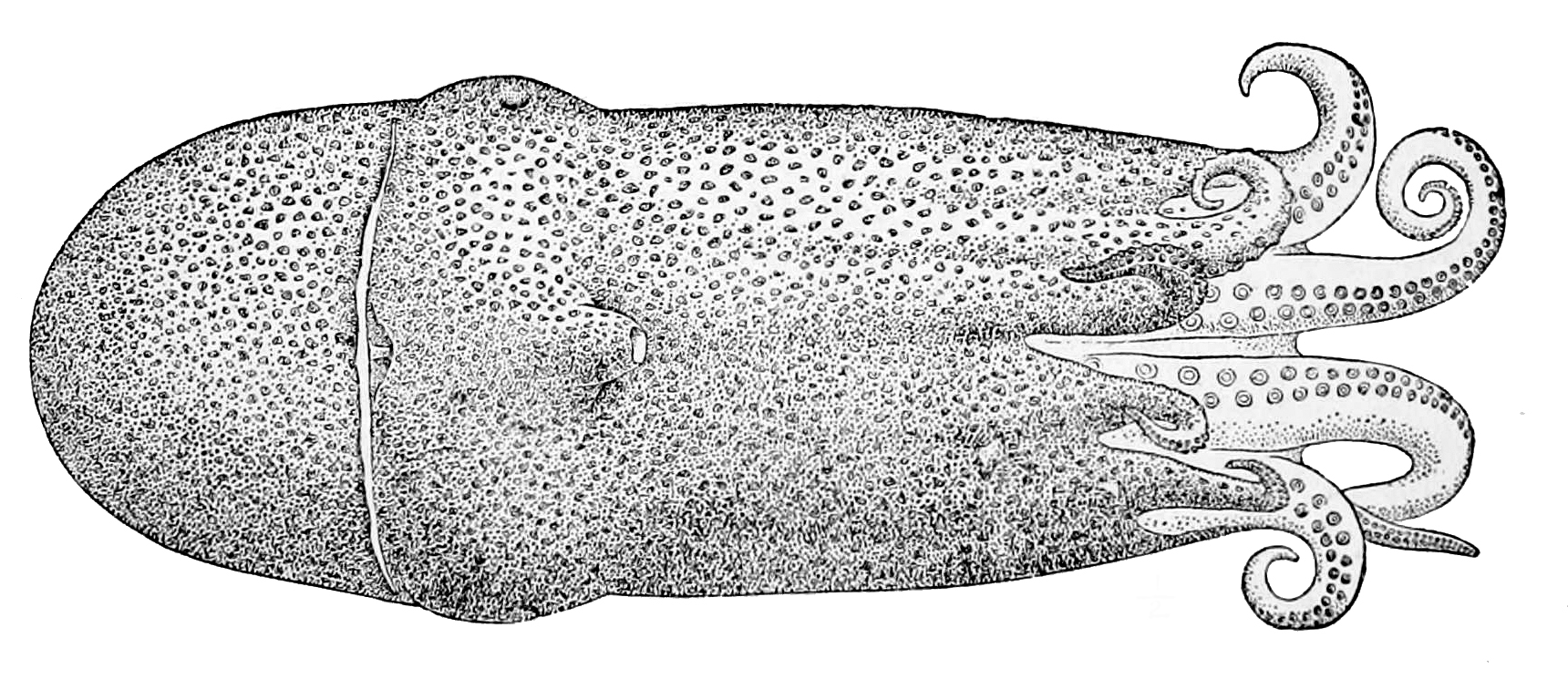
- Ventral view of young female (70 mm ML)
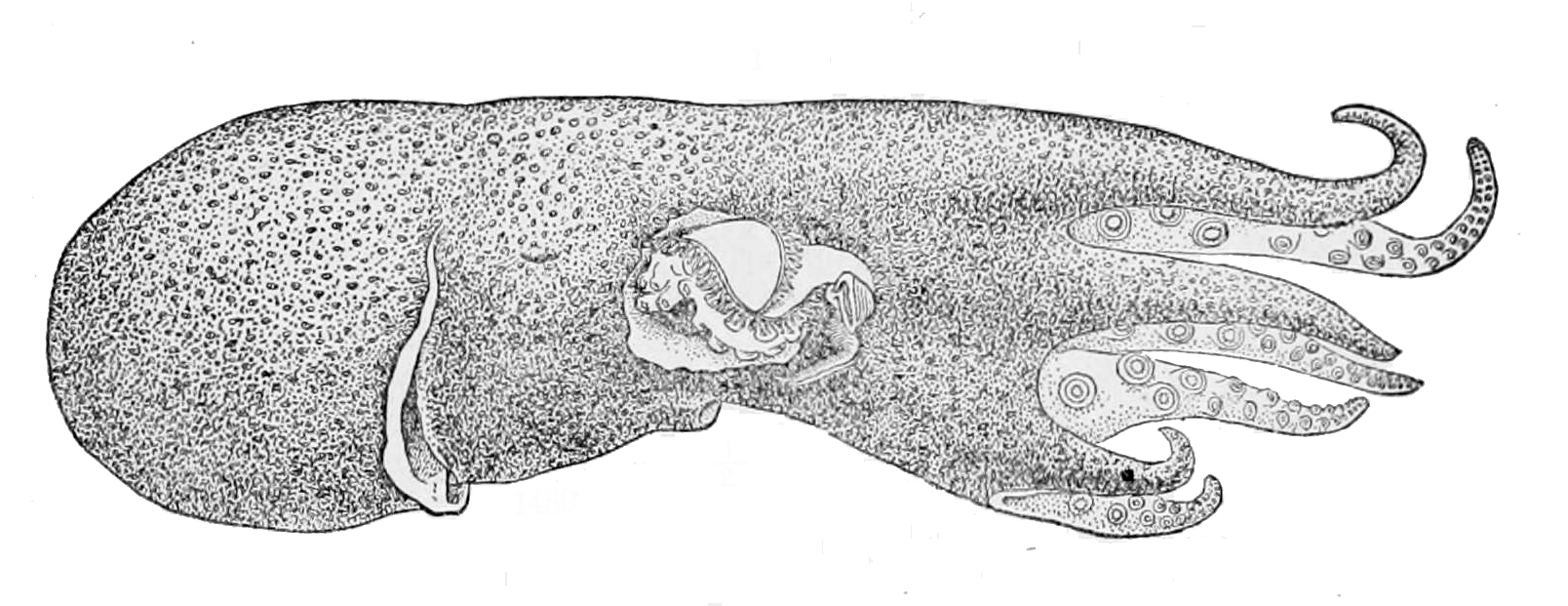
- Lateral view of young male

Conservation status
- Least Concern (IUCN 3.1)

Scientific classification
- Kingdom: Animalia
- Phylum: Mollusca
- Class: Cephalopoda
- Order: Octopoda
- Superfamily: Argonautoidea
- Family: Alloposidae; Verrill, 1881
- Genus: Haliphron; Steenstrup, 1861
- Species: H. atlanticus

Binomial name
- Haliphron atlanticus Steenstrup, 1861

Synonyms
- Alloposus mollis (Verrill, 1880); ?Octopus alberti (Joubin, 1895); Alloposus pacificus (Ijima & Ikeda, 1902); Heptopus danai (Joubin, 1929); Alloposus hardyi (Robson, 1930); ?Alloposina albatrossi (Robson, 1932)

= Seven-arm octopus =

Species of cephalopod

The seven-arm octopus (Haliphron atlanticus), also known as the blob octopus or sometimes called septopus, is one of the two largest known species of octopus; the largest specimen ever discovered had an estimated total length of 3.5 m (11 ft) and mass of 75 kg (165 lb). The only other similarly large extant species is the giant Pacific octopus, Enteroctopus dofleini.

The genera Alloposina (Grimpe, 1922), Alloposus (Verrill, 1880) and Heptopus (Joubin, 1929) are junior synonyms of Haliphron, a monotypic genus in the monotypic family Alloposidae, part of the superfamily Argonautoidea in the suborder Incirrata of the order Octopoda.

== Traits ==
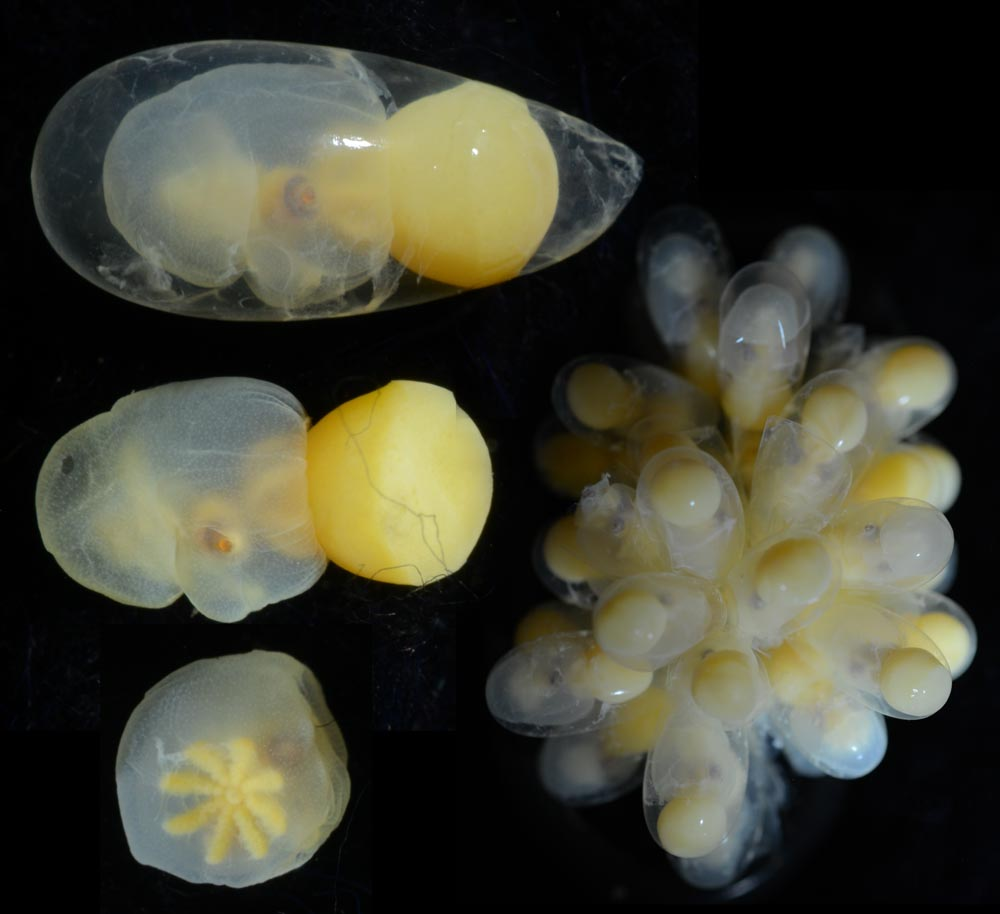
Egg string and embryos of H. atlanticus collected north of the Cape Verde Islands (17°24′N 22°57′W): The eggs measure around 8 mm (0.31 in) at their widest.

The seven-arm octopus is so named because in males, the hectocotylus (a specially modified arm used in egg fertilization) is coiled in a sac beneath the right eye. Due to this species' thick, gelatinous tissue, the arm is easily overlooked, giving the appearance of just seven arms. However, like other octopuses, it actually has eight.

Unlike most octopods, H. atlanticus has a swim bladder, an organ evolved from its digestive system. The swim bladder allows it to maintain neutral buoyancy, neither sinking nor rising in the water column.

Older specimens have been found to have shorter bodies and longer arms than juveniles.

While juveniles tend to be translucent, one study in 1985 in Norway studied the morphology between two female H. Atlanticus specimens, with one being a dark purple and the other a pale blue/white. Video evidence from the Monterey Bay Aquarium Research Institute (MBARI) was released showing a red specimen as well, giving the species a color range of blue to red when adults.

== Distribution ==
H. atlanticus is found worldwide in tropical and temperate waters.

The type specimen was collected in the Atlantic Ocean at 38°N 34°W (west of the Azores). It is deposited at the University of Copenhagen Zoological Museum.

Since then, several specimens have been caught throughout the Atlantic, as far as the Azores archipelago and near South Georgia Island.

In 2002, a single specimen of giant proportions was caught by fishermen trawling at a depth of 920 m (3,020 ft) off the eastern Chatham Rise, New Zealand. This specimen, the largest of this species and of all octopuses, was the first validated record of Haliphron from the South Pacific. It had a mantle length of 0.69 m (2.3 ft), a total length of 2.90 m (9.5 ft), and a weight of 61.0 kg (134.5 lb), although it was incomplete.

Another specimen was reported from Skjørafjorden, Norway, where a female was captured in a trawl net at approximately 100 m (328 ft) depth in November 2000. The individual measured about 96 cm (3.1 ft) in total length, though the arm tips were damaged, and weighed 8.5 kg (18.7 lb) when received by researchers. The specimen had a soft, gelatinous body with a reddish coloration and rows of pale suckers, and was later preserved and deposited at the NTNU Museum of Natural History and Archaeology in Trondheim.

Evidence of the species in northern waters is also supported by dietary studies of sperm whales, which have contained remains of H. atlanticus in their stomach contents. Because these whales are believed to feed in Arctic and northern boreal waters before migrating south, these findings suggest that the octopus occurs more widely in the Norwegian Sea and nearby Arctic regions than the relatively small number of direct captures of indicate.

There have also been multiple sightings of H. atlanticus in Monterey Bay in the Northeast Pacific Ocean.

== Mating and reproduction ==
The mating of H. atlanticus is poorly researched, but it is predicted to occur sporadically on the continental coast.

Dwarf males of H. atlanticus have been discovered. These males have invested energy for growth into reproductive traits such as a spermatophore and a muscular penis. They also possess a detachable hectocotylus which is used to transfer the spermatophore into their mates. These males qualify as dwarf males as they are only 5-15% of the size of a maximum female specimen of H. atlanticus. The organism's swim bladder helps them maintain buoyancy without expending large amounts of energy searching for mates.

== Ecology ==
Isotopic, photographic and video evidence have shown complex interactions between H. atlanticus and jellyfish and other gelatinous zooplankton, from feeding to protection, respectively. H. atlanticus specimen have been observed feeding in mesopelagic areas, particularly at the ridges of seamounts. The ROV Dolphin-3K observed H.atlanticus catching a mid-water jellyfish Periphyllopsis braueri, which was one of the first confirmed captures of a medusae. Stable isotope analyses indicate that H. atlanticus occupies an intermediate trophic level among deep-sea cephalopods, consistent with feeding on gelatinous zooplankton as well as other prey types.

Lower levels of iron and zinc have been found in H. atlanticus muscle tissue compared to other rare cephalopods, indicating a "cleaner" prey such as jellyfish. Additionally, H. atlanticus exhibit selective feeding by specifically target high-nutrient areas such as the stomach and reproductive organs of jellyfish.

Predators of H. atlanticus include the blue shark, sperm whale, Hawaiian monk seal, and swordfish. This may be in part due to the diel vertical migration and diving that some of these species perform. The octopus has also been found in the stomach contents of shorebirds like Cory's shearwater, which predate on the octopus after it is driven to the surface by other organisms. On rare occasion, lancetfish and some species of tuna will predate on H. atlanticus.

== Potential divergence of species ==
Though widely considered monospecific, there is genetic evidence that there are multiple Haliphron species, with at least one in the South Pacific and one in the North Pacific. DNA Analysis of the COI gene from a specimen fragment discovered near the Fernando de Noronha archipelago in Brazil provided further evidence of this divergence. This genetic testing revealed that the specimen from the Brazilian coast shared a closer relationship with North Pacific populations than with those previously documented in the North Atlantic. These findings suggest that the H. atlanticus may actually consist of at least two species, one residing in the North Atlantic and another from the South Atlantic and Pacific Oceans.

== See also ==
- Cephalopod size
