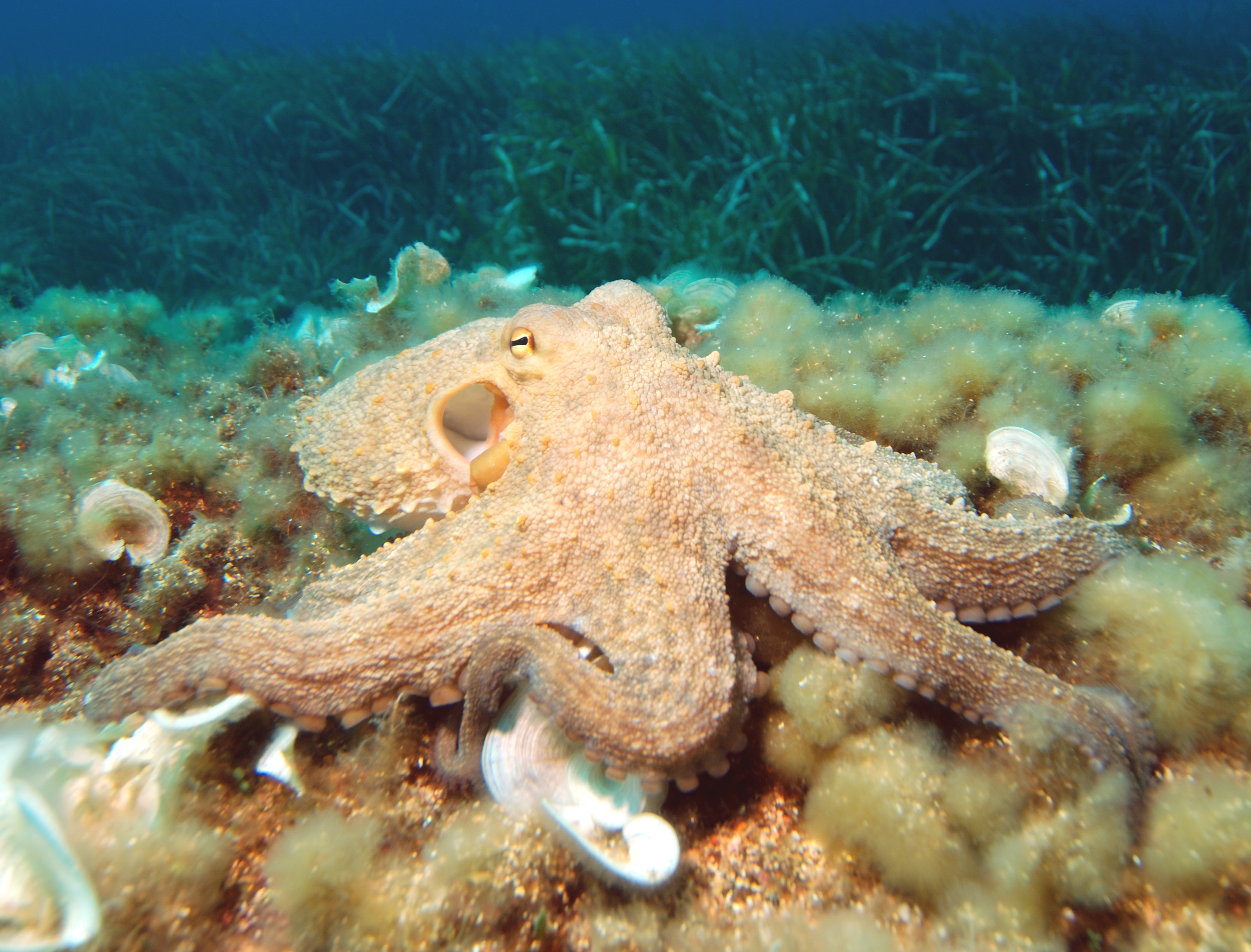
- Common octopus (Octopus vulgaris)

Scientific classification
- Kingdom: Animalia
- Phylum: Mollusca
- Class: Cephalopoda
- Division: Neocoleoidea
- Clade: Vampyropoda
- Superorder: Octopodiformes
- Order: Octopoda; Leach, 1818

Suborders
- (traditional): Cirrina; Incirrina; See § Evolution for families

Synonyms
- Octopoida Leach, 1817

= Octopus =

Octopus Temporal range: Middle Jurassic – recent

Soft-bodied eight-limbed order of molluscs

An octopus (pl.: octopuses or octopodes (Note: See § Etymology and pluralisation for variants.)) is a soft-bodied, eight-limbed mollusc of the order Octopoda (/ɒkˈtɒpədə/, ok-TOP-ə-də). The order consists of some 300 species and is grouped within the class Cephalopoda with squids, cuttlefish, and nautiloids. Like other cephalopods, an octopus is bilaterally symmetric with two eyes and a beaked mouth at the centre point of the eight limbs. (Note: "Tentacle" is a common umbrella term for cephalopod limbs. In teuthological context, octopuses have "arms" with suckers along their entire length while "tentacle" is reserved for appendages with suckers only near the end of the limb, which octopuses lack.) An octopus can radically deform its shape, enabling it to squeeze through small gaps. They trail their appendages behind them as they swim backwards. The siphon is used for respiration and locomotion (by water jet propulsion). Octopuses have a complex nervous system and excellent sight, and are among the most intelligent and behaviourally diverse invertebrates.

Octopuses inhabit various ocean habitats, including coral reefs, pelagic waters, and the seabed; some live in the intertidal zone and others at abyssal depths. Most species grow quickly, mature early, and are short-lived. In most species, the male uses a specially-adapted arm to deliver sperm directly into the female's mantle cavity, after which he becomes senescent and dies, while the female deposits fertilised eggs in a den and cares for them until they hatch, after which she also dies. They are predators and hunt crustaceans, bivalves, gastropods and fish. Strategies to defend themselves against their own predators include expelling ink, camouflage, and threat displays, the ability to jet quickly through the water and hide, and deceit. All octopuses are venomous, but only the blue-ringed octopuses are known to be deadly to humans.

Octopuses appear in mythology as sea monsters such as the kraken of Norway and the Akkorokamui of the Ainu, and possibly the Gorgons of ancient Greece. A battle with an octopus appears in Victor Hugo's book Toilers of the Sea. Octopuses appear in Japanese shunga erotic art. They are eaten and considered a delicacy by humans in many parts of the world, especially the Mediterranean and Asia.

== Etymology and pluralisation ==
The scientific Latin term octopus was derived from Ancient Greek ὀκτώπους (oktōpous), a compound form of ὀκτώ (oktō, 'eight') and πούς (pous, 'foot'), itself a variant form of ὀκτάπους, a word used for example by Alexander of Tralles (c. 525 – c. 605).

The standard pluralised form of octopus in English is octopuses; the Ancient Greek plural ὀκτώποδες, octopodes (/ɒkˈtɒpədiːz/), has also been used historically. The alternative plural octopi is usually considered etymologically incorrect, because it wrongly assumes that octopus is a Latin second-declension -us noun or adjective when, in either Greek or Latin, it is a third-declension noun. Historically, the first plural to commonly appear in English language sources, in the early 19th century, is the Latinate form octopi, followed by the English form octopuses in the latter half of the same century. The Hellenic plural is roughly contemporary in usage, although it is also the rarest.

A Dictionary of Modern English Usage by H. W. Fowler states that the only acceptable plural in English is octopuses, that octopi is misconceived, and octopodes pedantic; the last is nonetheless used frequently enough to be acknowledged by the descriptivist Merriam-Webster 11th Collegiate Dictionary and Webster's New World College Dictionary. The Oxford English Dictionary lists octopuses, octopi, and octopodes, in that order, reflecting frequency of use, calling octopodes rare and noting that octopi is based on a misunderstanding. The New Oxford American Dictionary (3rd Edition, 2010) lists octopuses as the only acceptable pluralisation, and indicates that octopodes is occasionally used, but that octopi is incorrect.

== Anatomy and physiology ==
=== Size ===
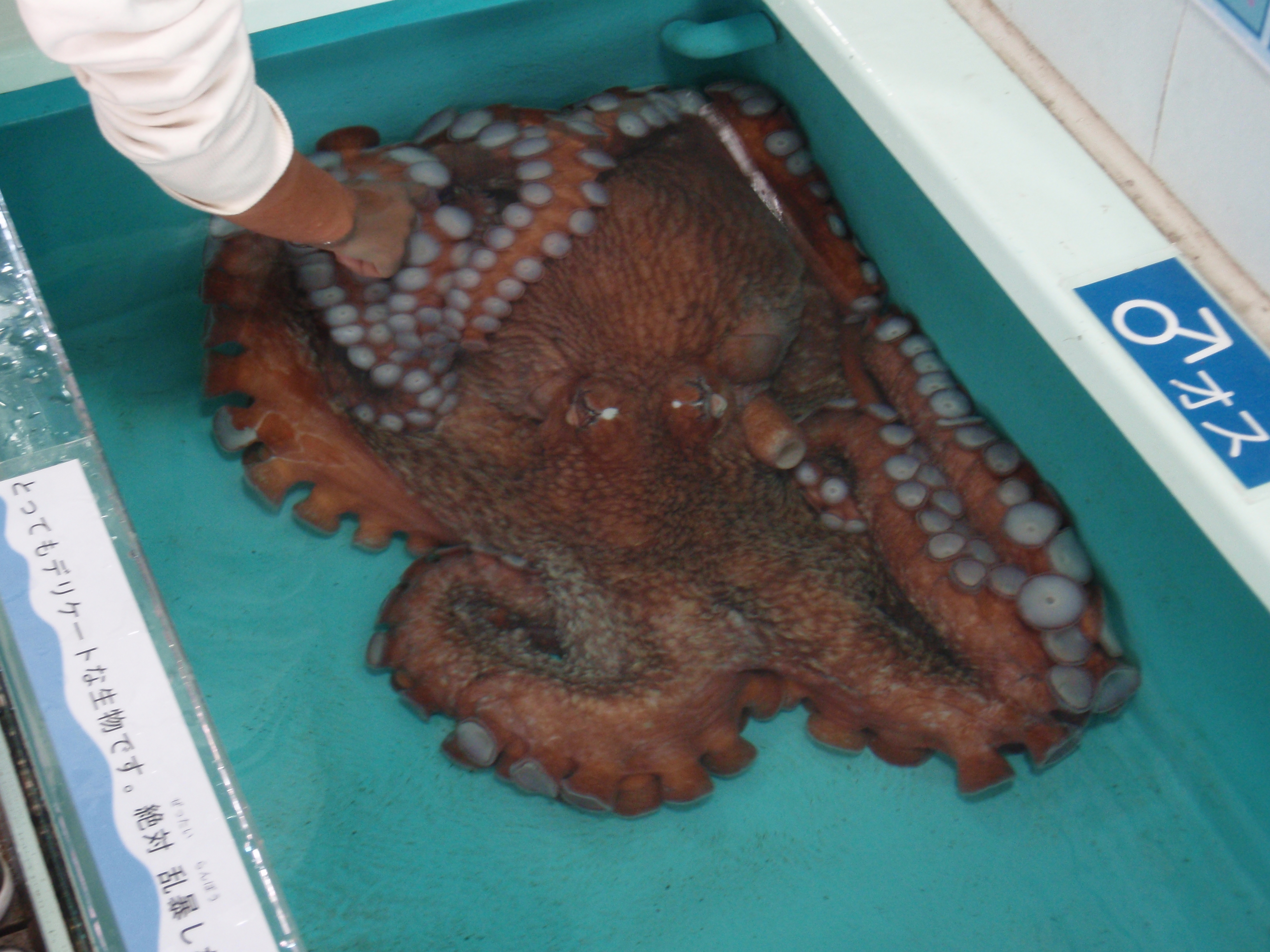
A giant Pacific octopus at Echizen Matsushima Aquarium, Japan

The giant Pacific octopus (Enteroctopus dofleini) is often cited as the largest octopus species. Adults usually weigh 10–50 kg (22–110 lb), with an arm span of up to 4.8 m (16 ft). The largest specimen of this species to be scientifically documented reached a live mass of 71 kg (157 lb). Much larger sizes have been claimed: one specimen was recorded as 600 lb (270 kg) with an arm span of 32 ft (9.8 m). A carcass of the seven-arm octopus, Haliphron atlanticus, weighed 61 kg (134 lb) and was estimated to have had a live mass of 75 kg (165 lb). The smallest species is Octopus wolfi, which is around 2.5 cm (1 in) and weighs less than 1 g (0.035 oz).

=== External characteristics ===
The octopus has an elongated body that is bilaterally symmetrical along its dorso-ventral (back to belly) axis; the head and foot are on the ventral side, but act as the anterior (front). The head contains both the mouth and the brain. The mouth has a sharp chitinous beak and is surrounded by and underneath the foot, which evolved into flexible, prehensile limbs, known as "arms", which are attached to each other near their base by a webbed structure. The arms can be described based on side and sequence position (such as L1, R1, L2, R2) and divide into four pairs. The two rear appendages are generally used to walk on the sea floor, while the other six are used to forage for food. The bulbous and hollow mantle is fused to the back of the head and contains most of the vital organs. The mantle also has a cavity with muscular walls and a pair of gills; it is connected to the exterior by a funnel or siphon.

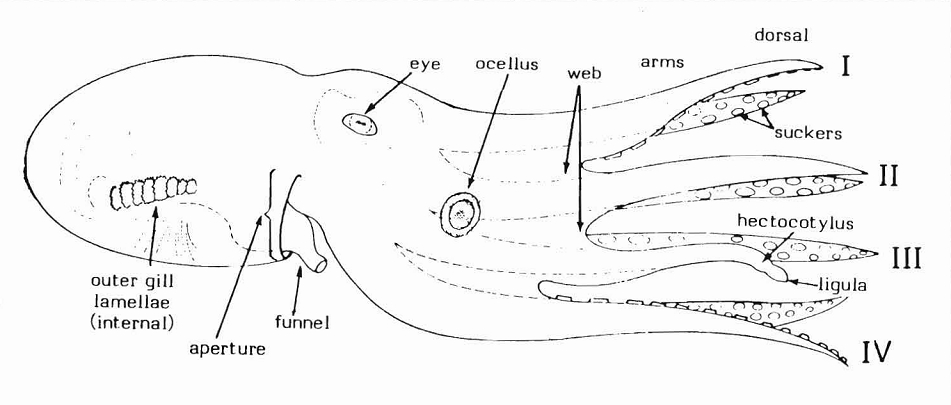
Diagram of octopus from side, with gills, funnel, eye, ocellus (eyespot), web, arms, suckers, hectocotylus and ligula labelled.

The skin consists of a thin epidermis with mucous cells and sensory cells and a fibrous dermis made of collagen and containing various cells that allow colour change. Most of the body is made of soft tissue, allowing it to squeeze through tiny gaps; even the larger species can pass through a gap little more than 2.5 cm (1 in) in diameter. Lacking skeletal support, the arms work as muscular hydrostats and feature longitudinal, transverse, and circular muscles around a central axial nerve. They can squash and stretch, coil at any place in any direction or stiffen.

The interior surfaces of the arms are covered with circular, adhesive suckers. The suckers allow the octopus to secure itself in place or to handle objects. Each sucker is typically circular and bowl-like and has two distinct parts: an outer disc-shaped infundibulum and an inner cup-like acetabulum, both of which are thick muscles covered in connective tissue. A chitinous cuticle lines the outer surface. When a sucker attaches to a surface, the orifice between the two structures is sealed and the infundibulum flattens. Muscle contractions allow for attachment and detachment. Each of the eight arms senses and responds to light, allowing the octopus to control its limbs even if its head is obscured.

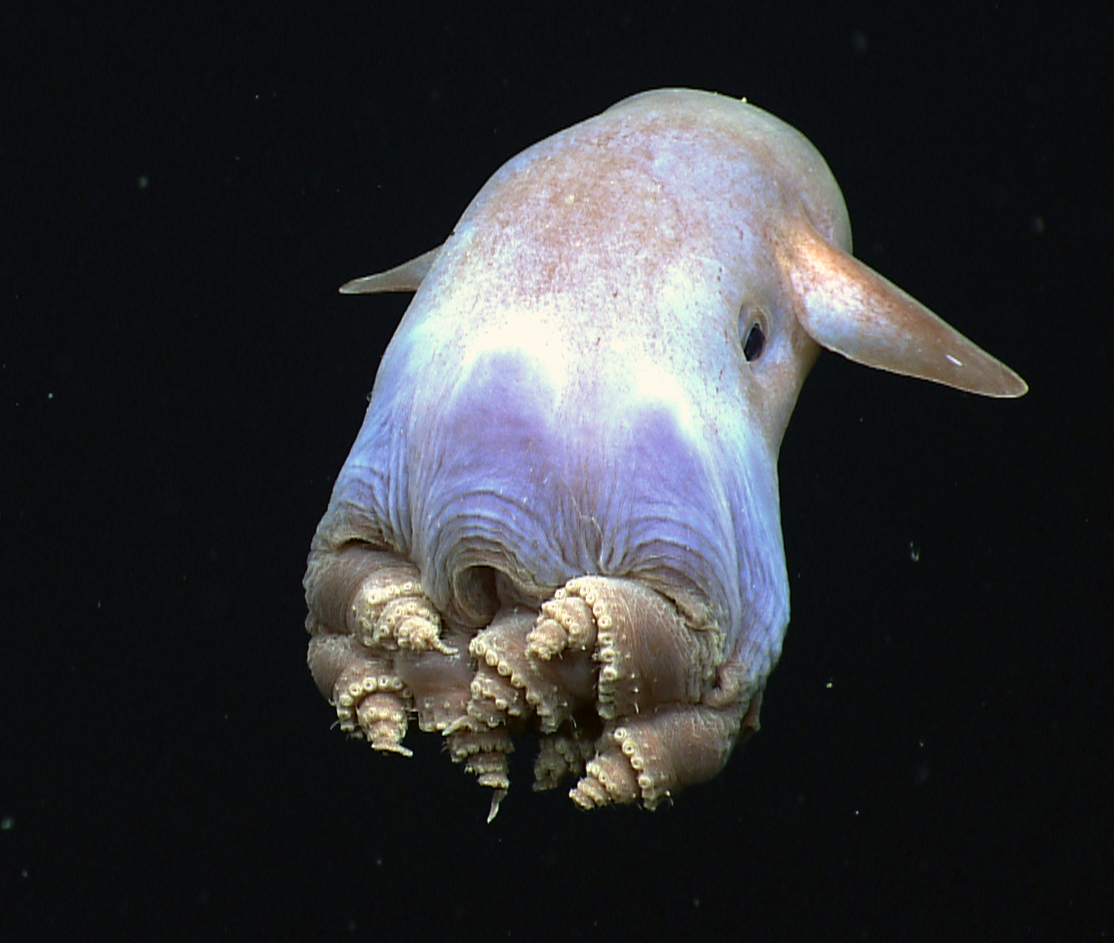
A finned Grimpoteuthis species with its atypical octopus body plan

The cranium has two cartilaginous capsules each containing one large eye, which resembles those of fish. The cornea is formed from a translucent epidermal layer; the slit-shaped pupil forms a hole in the iris just behind the cornea. The lens hangs behind the pupil; photoreceptive retinal cells line the back. The pupil can expand and contract; a retinal pigment screens incident light in bright conditions.

Some species differ in form from the typical body shape. Basal species, the Cirrina, have gelatinous bodies with two fins located above the eyes, an internal shell and mostly webbed arms that are lined with fleshy papillae or cirri underneath.

=== Circulatory system ===
Octopuses have a closed circulatory system, in which the blood remains inside blood vessels. They have three hearts; a systemic or main heart that circulates blood around the body and two branchial or gill hearts that pump it through the two gills. The systemic heart becomes inactive when the animal is swimming. Thus, the octopus loses energy quickly and mostly crawls. Octopus blood contains the copper-rich protein haemocyanin to transport oxygen. This makes the blood viscous and it requires great pressure to pump it around the body; blood pressures can surpass 75 mmHg (10 kPa). In cold conditions with low oxygen levels, haemocyanin transports oxygen more efficiently than haemoglobin. The haemocyanin is dissolved in the blood plasma instead of carried within blood cells and gives the blood a bluish colour.

The systemic heart has muscular contractile walls and consists of a single ventricle and two atria, which attach it to each of the two gills. The blood vessels consist of arteries, capillaries and veins and are lined with a cellular endothelium unlike that of most other invertebrates. The blood circulates through the aorta and capillary system, to the venae cavae, after which the blood is pumped through the gills by the branchial hearts and back to the main heart. Much of the venous system is contractile, which helps circulate the blood.

=== Respiration ===
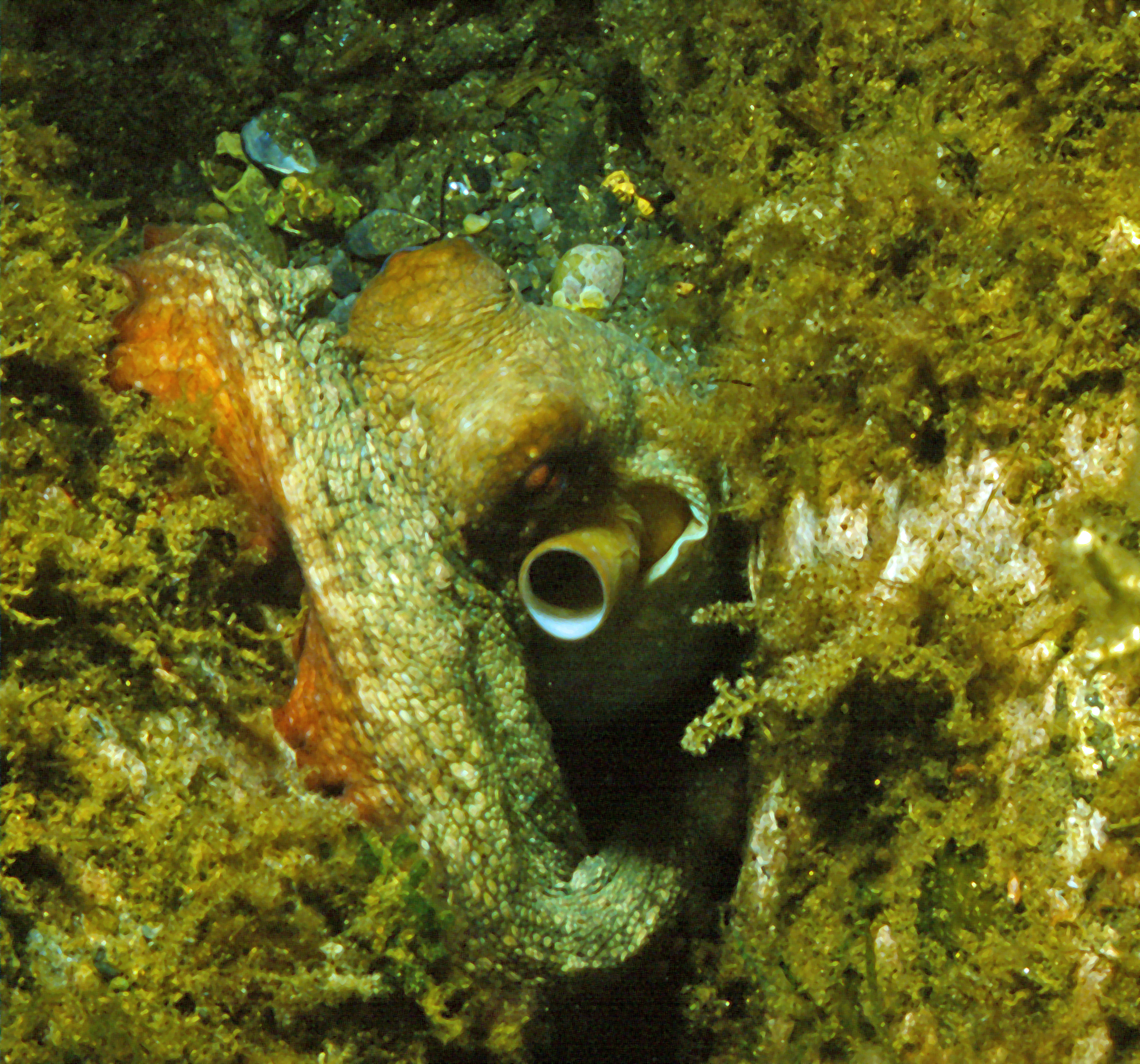
Octopus with open siphon. The siphon is used for respiration, waste disposal and discharging ink.

Respiration involves drawing water into the mantle cavity through an aperture, passing it through the gills, and expelling it through the siphon. Ingress is achieved by contraction of radial muscles in the mantle wall, and flapper valves shut when strong, circular muscles expel the water through the siphon. Extensive connective tissue lattices support the respiratory muscles and allow them to inflate the respiratory chamber. The lamella structure of the gills allows for high oxygen uptake, up to 65% in water at 20 °C (68 °F). Respiration can also play a role in locomotion, as an octopus can propel its body shooting water out of the siphon.

The thin skin absorbs additional oxygen. When resting, around 41% of oxygen absorption is through the skin, reduced to 33% when the octopus swims, despite the amount of oxygen absorption increasing as water flows over the body. When it is resting after a meal, skin absorption can drop to 3%.

=== Digestion and excretion ===
The digestive system begins with the buccal mass which consists of the mouth with the beak, the pharynx, radula and salivary glands. The radula is serrated and made of chitin. Food is broken down and is forced into the esophagus by two lateral extensions of the oesophageal side walls in addition to the radula. From there it is transferred to the gastrointestinal tract, which is mostly suspended from the roof of the mantle cavity. The tract consists of a crop, where the food is stored; a stomach, where it is mixed with other gut material; a caecum where the food is separated into particles and liquids and which absorbs fats; the digestive gland, where liver cells break down and absorb the fluid and become "brown bodies"; and the intestine, where the built-up waste is turned into faecal ropes by secretions and ejected out of the funnel via the rectum.

During osmoregulation, fluid is added to the pericardia of the branchial hearts. The octopus has two nephridia (equivalent to vertebrate kidneys) that are associated with the branchial hearts; these and their associated ducts connect the pericardial cavities with the mantle cavity. Each branch of the vena cava has renal appendages that pass over the thin-walled nephridium before reaching the branchial heart. Urine is created in the pericardial cavity, and is altered by excretion, of mostly ammonia, and absorption from the renal appendages, as it is passed along the associated duct and through the nephridiopore into the mantle cavity.

A common octopus (Octopus vulgaris) moving around. Its nervous system allows the arms to move with some autonomy.

=== Nervous system and senses ===
Octopuses and their relatives have a more expansive and complex nervous system than other invertebrates, containing over 500 million neurons, around the same as a dog. One part is localised in the brain, contained in a cartilaginous capsule. Two-thirds of the neurons are in the nerve cords of its arms. This allows their arms to perform actions with a degree of independence. Learning mainly occurs in the brain, while arms make decisions independently when supplied with information. A severed arm can still move and respond to stimuli. Unlike in many other animals, including other molluscs, the movement of octopuses and their relatives are not organised in their brains via internal somatotopic maps of their bodies. Octopuses have the same jumping genes that are active in the human brain, implying an evolutionary convergence at molecular level.

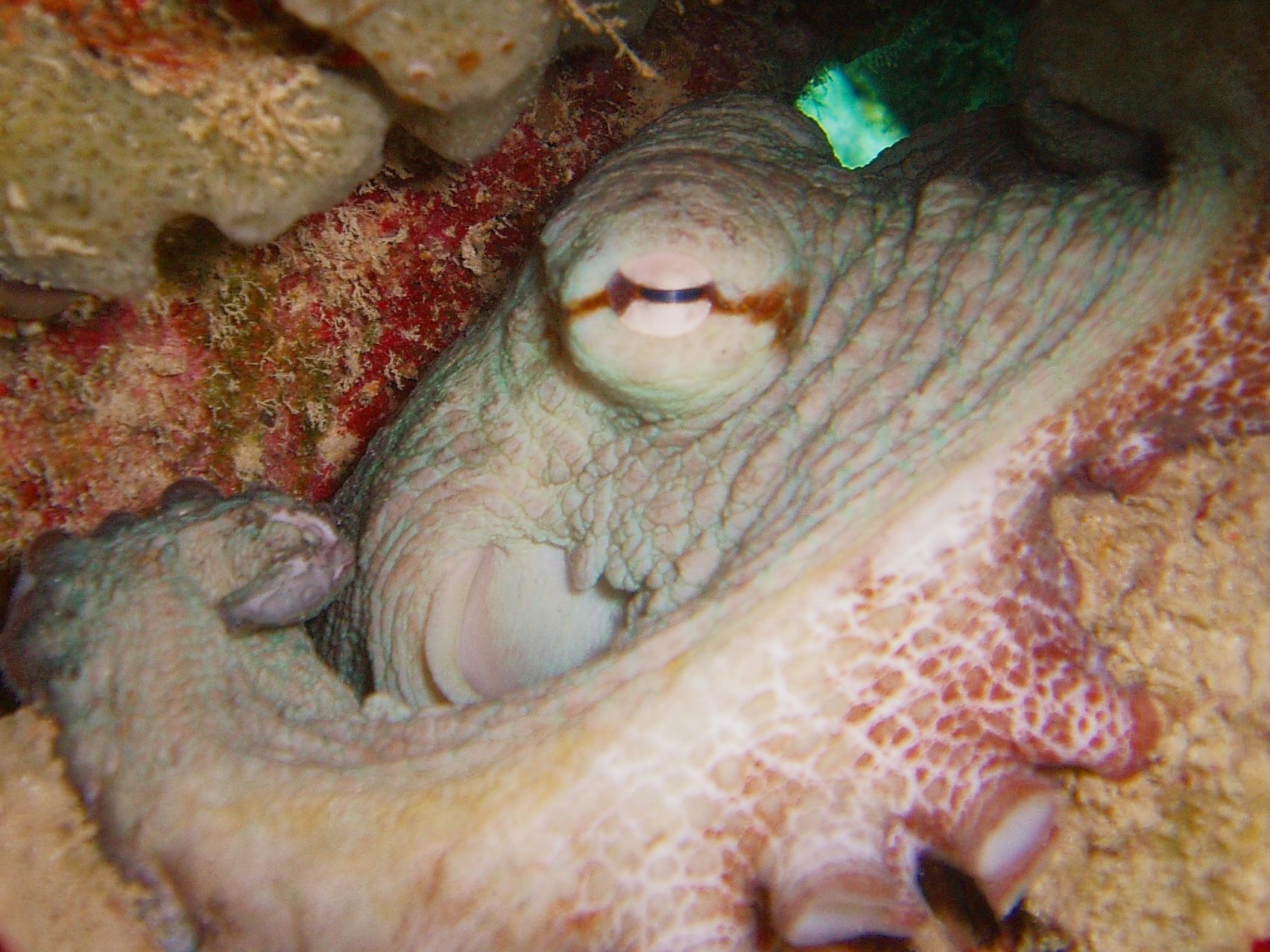
Eye of common octopus

Like other cephalopods, octopuses have camera-like eyes. Colour vision appears to vary from species to species, for example, it is present in A. aegina but absent in O. vulgaris. Opsins in the skin respond to different wavelengths of light and help the animals choose a colouration that matches the surroundings and camouflages them; chromatophores in the skin can respond to light independently of the eyes. An alternative hypothesis is that cephalopod eyes in species that only have a single photoreceptor protein may use chromatic aberration to turn monochromatic vision into colour vision, though this lowers image quality. This would explain pupils shaped like the letter "U", the letter "W", or a dumbbell, as well as the need for colourful mating displays.

Attached to the optic capsules are two organs called statocysts (sac-like structures containing a mineralised mass and sensitive hairs), that allow the octopus to sense the orientation of its body, relative to both gravity and time (angular acceleration). An autonomic response keeps the octopus's eyes oriented so that the pupil is always horizontal. Octopuses may also use the statocyst to hear. The common octopus can hear sounds between 400 Hz and 1000 Hz, and hears best at 600 Hz.

Octopuses have an excellent somatosensory system. Their suction cups are equipped with chemoreceptors so they can taste what they touch. Octopus arms move easily because the sensors recognise octopus skin and prevent self-attachment. Octopuses appear to have poor proprioceptive sense and must see their arms to keep track of their position.

=== Ink sac ===
The ink sac is located under the digestive gland. A gland attached to the sac produces the ink, and the sac holds it. The sac is close enough to the funnel for the octopus to shoot out the ink with a water jet. As the animal begins to shoot, the ink passes through glands which mix it with mucus and it leaves the funnel as a thick, dark blob, which helps the animal to escape from a predator. The main pigment in the ink is melanin, which gives it its black colour. Cirrate octopuses usually lack the ink sac.

== Life cycle ==
=== Reproduction ===
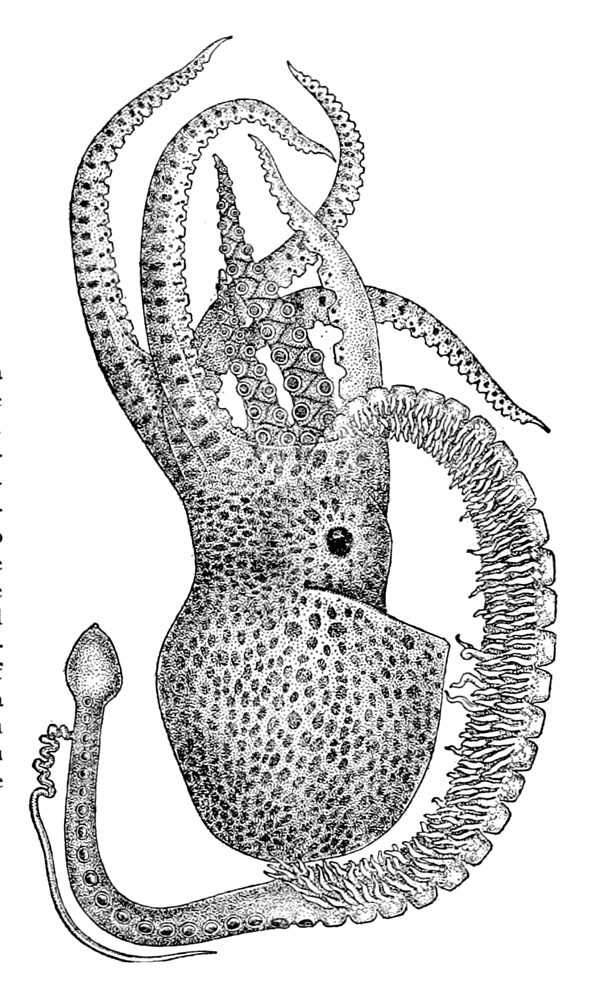
Adult male Tremoctopus violaceus with hectocotylus

Octopuses have two sexes and have only one gonad (testis in males and ovary in females) located posteriorly. The gonad deposits gametes into an adjacent cavity called the gonocoel. A gonoduct bridges the gonocoel with the mantle cavity. An optic gland creates hormones that cause the octopus to mature and age and stimulate gamete production. The timing of reproduction and lifespan depends on environmental conditions such as temperature, light and nutrition, which trigger the gland. The male has a specialised arm called a hectocotylus which it uses to transfer spermatophores (packets of sperm) into the female's mantle cavity. The hectocotylus in Octopus is usually the R3 arm, which has a spoon-shaped depression and a suckerless tip. Fertilisation may occur in the mantle cavity or in the surrounding water.

Reproduction has been studied in some species. In the giant Pacific octopus, courtship includes changes in skin texture and colour, mostly in the male. The male may cling to the top or side of the female or position himself beside her. There is some speculation that he may first use his hectocotylus to remove any spermatophore or sperm already present in the female. He picks up a spermatophore from his spermatophoric sac with the hectocotylus, inserts it into the female's mantle cavity, and deposits it in the correct location in the opening of the oviduct. Two spermatophores are transferred in this way; these are about one metre (yard) long, and the empty ends may protrude from the female's mantle. A complex hydraulic mechanism releases the sperm from the spermatophore.

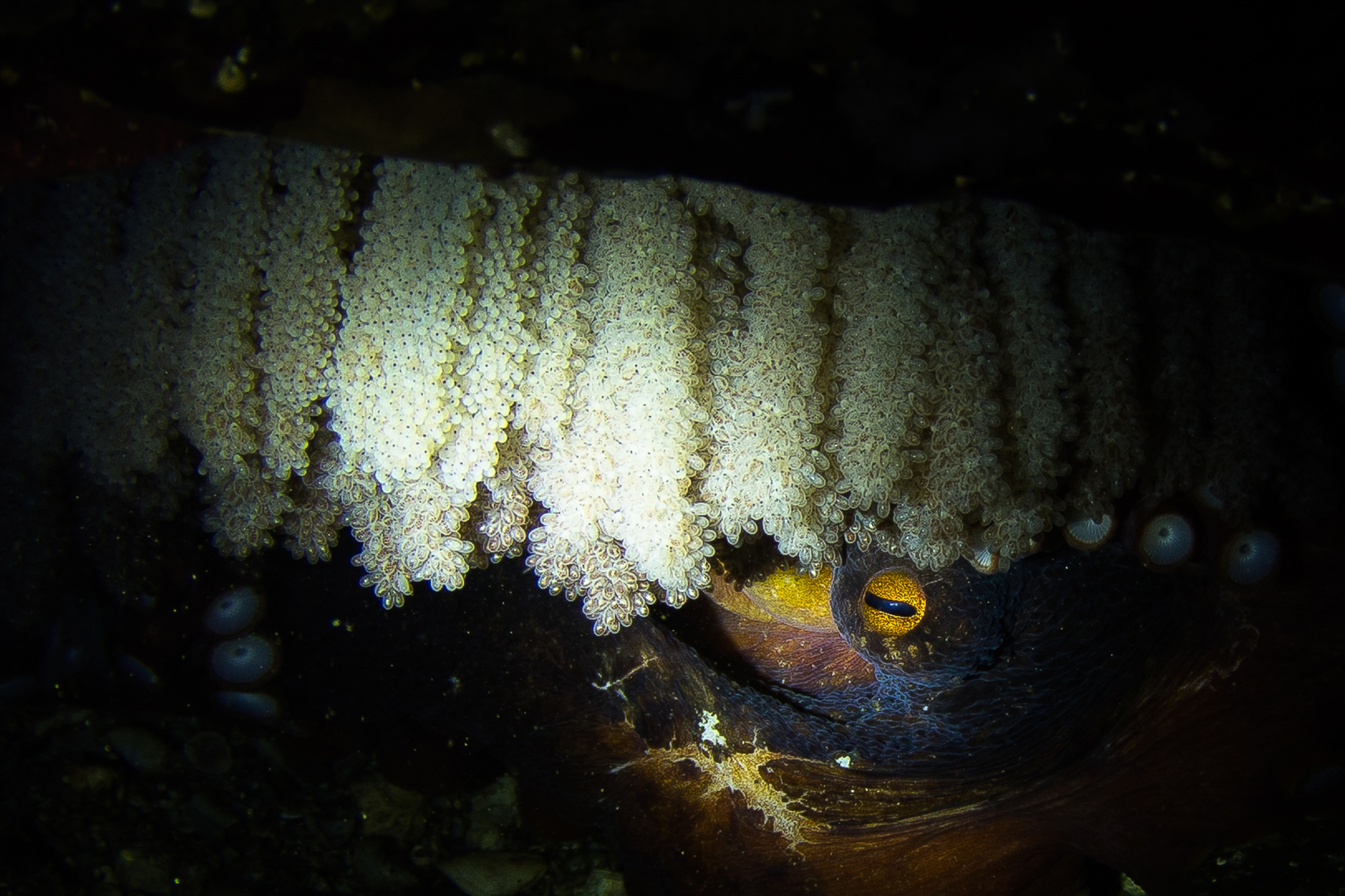
Female giant Pacific octopus guarding strings of eggs

The eggs have large yolks; cleavage (division) is relatively shallow and a germinal disc develops at the pole. During gastrulation, the disc surrounds the yolk, forming a yolk sac, which eventually forms part of the gut. The embryo forms as the dorsal side of the disc grows upward, with a shell gland, gills, mantle and eyes on its dorsal side. The arms and funnel form on the ventral side of the disc, with the former moving upward to surround the mouth. The embryo consumes the yolk during development.

Over a month after mating, giant Pacific octopuses lay eggs. The species can lay 180,000 eggs in a single clutch, while O. rubescens clutches host up to 45,000 eggs while O. vulgaris clutches can include 500,000 eggs. Fertilised octopus eggs are laid as strings within a shelter. Female giant Pacific octopuses nurture and protect their eggs for five months (160 days) until they hatch. In colder waters, such as those off Alaska, it may take up to ten months for the eggs to completely develop. In the argonaut (paper nautilus), the female is much larger than the male. She secretes a thin shell shaped like a cornucopia, in which the eggs are deposited and in which she also resides and broods the young while swimming.

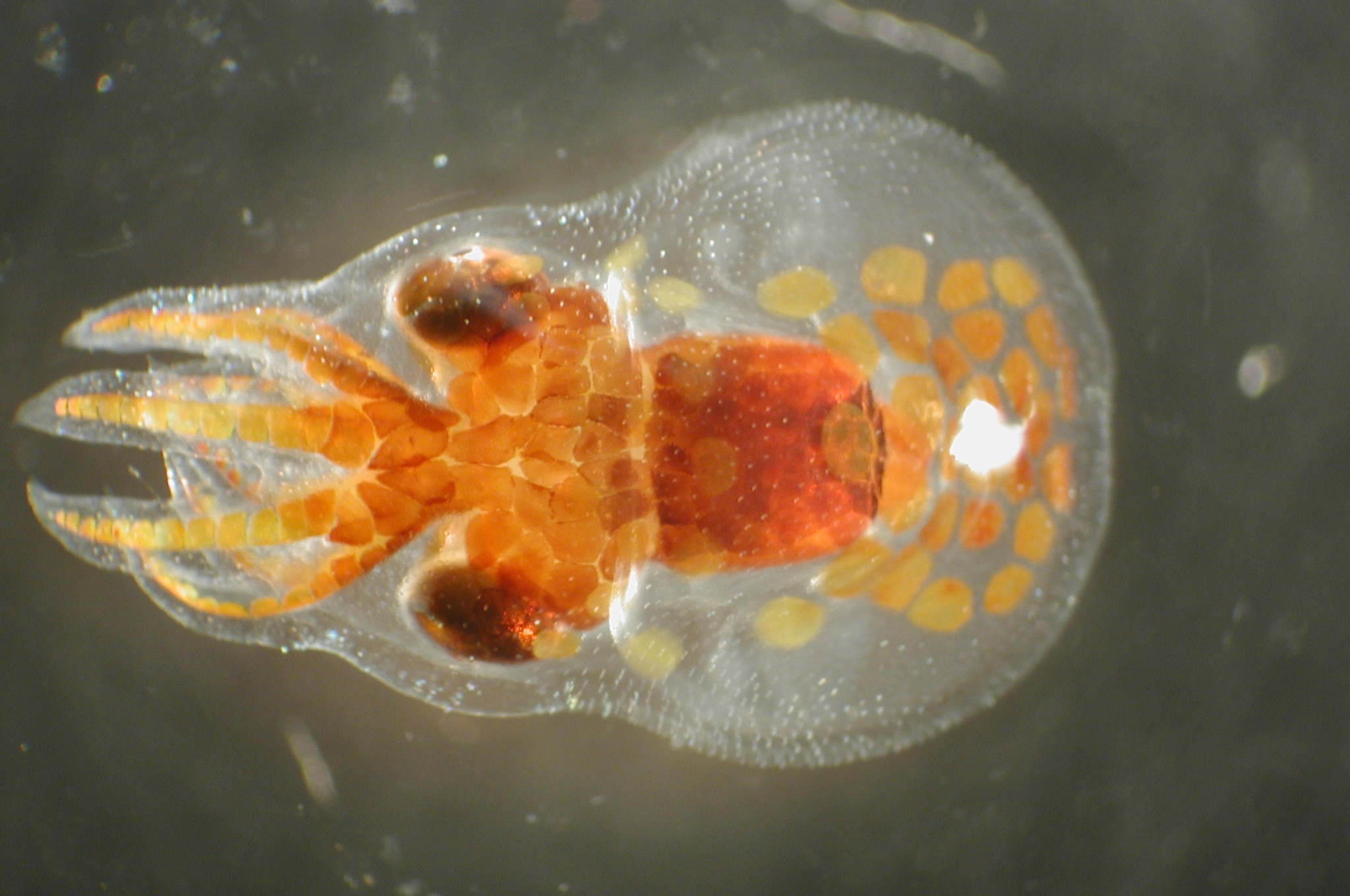
Octopus paralarva, a planktonic hatchling

Most young octopuses hatch as paralarvae, Octopus larvae in particular are planktonic for weeks or months. Larvae feed on shrimp, isopods and amphipods, eventually settling on the ocean floor to mature. Species that produce larger eggs instead hatch as benthic animals similar to the adults. These include the southern blue-ringed, Caribbean reef, California two-spot and Eledone moschata.

=== Lifespan ===
Octopuses have short lifespans, living up to four years. The lifecycles of some species finish in less than half a year. For most octopuses, the ultimate life stage is senescence. It is the breakdown of cellular function without repair or replacement. It may last from weeks to a few months at most. Males senesce after mating, while for females, it comes after they lay an egg clutch. During senescence, an octopus does not feed, quickly weakens, and becomes sluggish. Lesions begin to form and the octopus literally degenerates. They may die of starvation or get picked off by predators. Senescence is triggered by the optic glands and experimental removal of them after spawning was found to extend their lifecycle and activity.

== Distribution and habitat ==
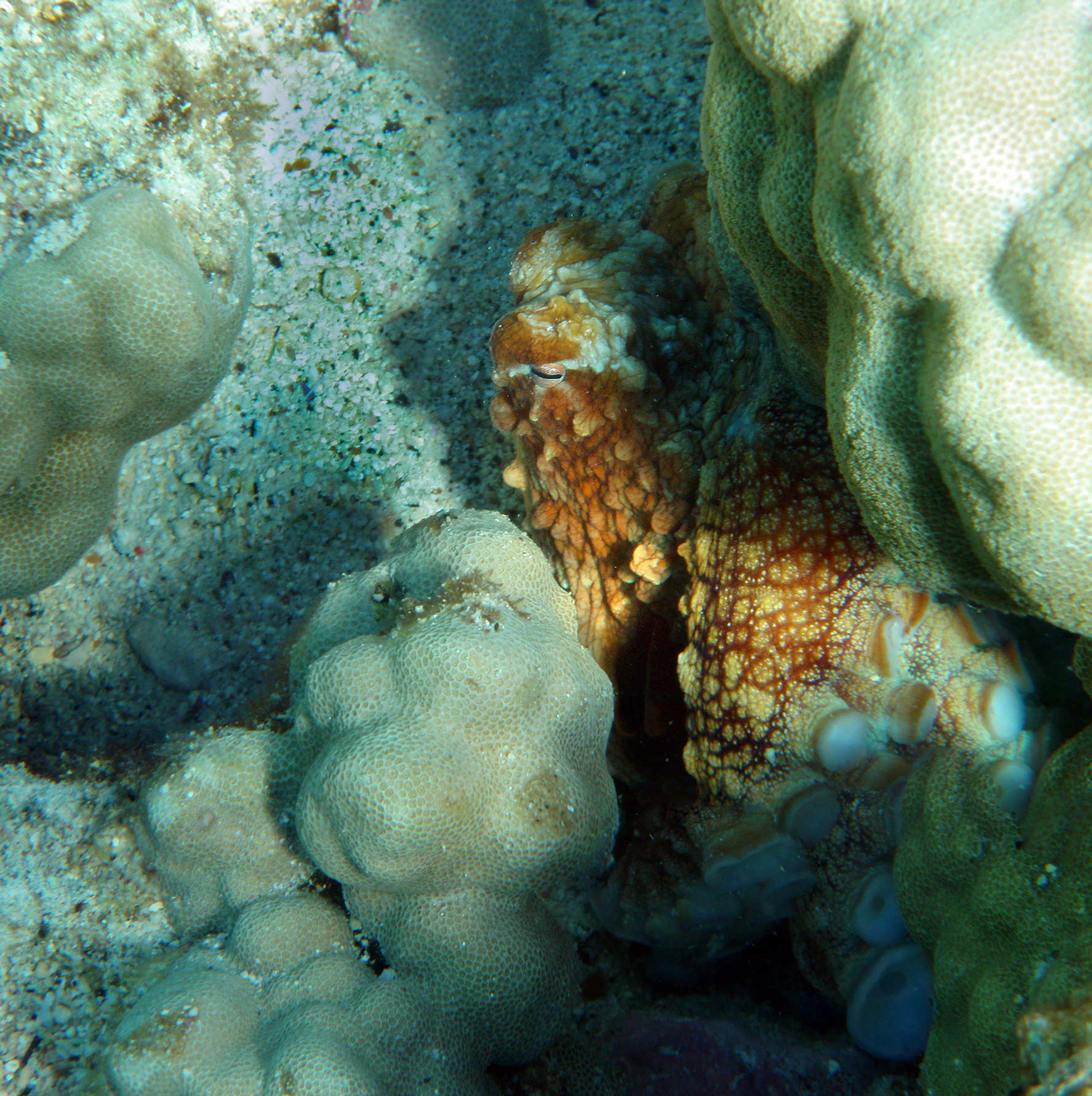
Octopus cyanea in Kona, Hawaii

Octopuses inhabit every ocean, with species adapted to many habitats. As juveniles, common octopuses inhabit shallow tide pools. The Hawaiian day octopus (Octopus cyanea) lives on coral reefs, while argonauts float in pelagic waters. Abdopus aculeatus is a near-shore species and can be found in seagrass beds. Some species can survive in deeper environments. The spoon-armed octopus (Bathypolypus arcticus) can live 1,000 m (3,300 ft) deep, and Vulcanoctopus hydrothermalis lives in depths of 2,000 m (6,600 ft) around hydrothermal vents. Species such as Megaleledone setebos and Pareledone charcoti, can survive in the waters of the Antarctic, which reach −1.8 °C (29 °F). No species are known to live in fresh water.

The cirrate species are often free-swimming and live in deep-water habitats. Although several species live at bathyal and abyssal depths, only a single indisputable record documents their presence in the hadal zone; a species of Grimpoteuthis (dumbo octopus) photographed at 6,957 m (22,825 ft).

== Behaviour and ecology ==
Octopuses are mostly solitary though a few are known to live in groups and interact regularly, usually in the context of dominance and reproductive competition. This is likely the result of abundant food supplies combined with fewer den sites. The Larger Pacific striped octopus has been described as particularly social, living in groups of up to 40. Octopuses hide in dens, which are typically crevices in rocky or other hard structures, including man-made ones. Small species may use abandoned shells and bottles. They can navigate to a den without having to retrace their outward route. They are not migratory.

Octopuses bring captured prey to the den to eat. Dens are often surrounded by a midden of dead and uneaten food items. These middens may attract scavengers such as fish, molluscs, and echinoderms. On rare occasions, octopuses hunt cooperatively with other species, with fish as their partners. They regulate the species composition of the hunting group – and the behaviour of their partners – by punching them.

=== Feeding ===
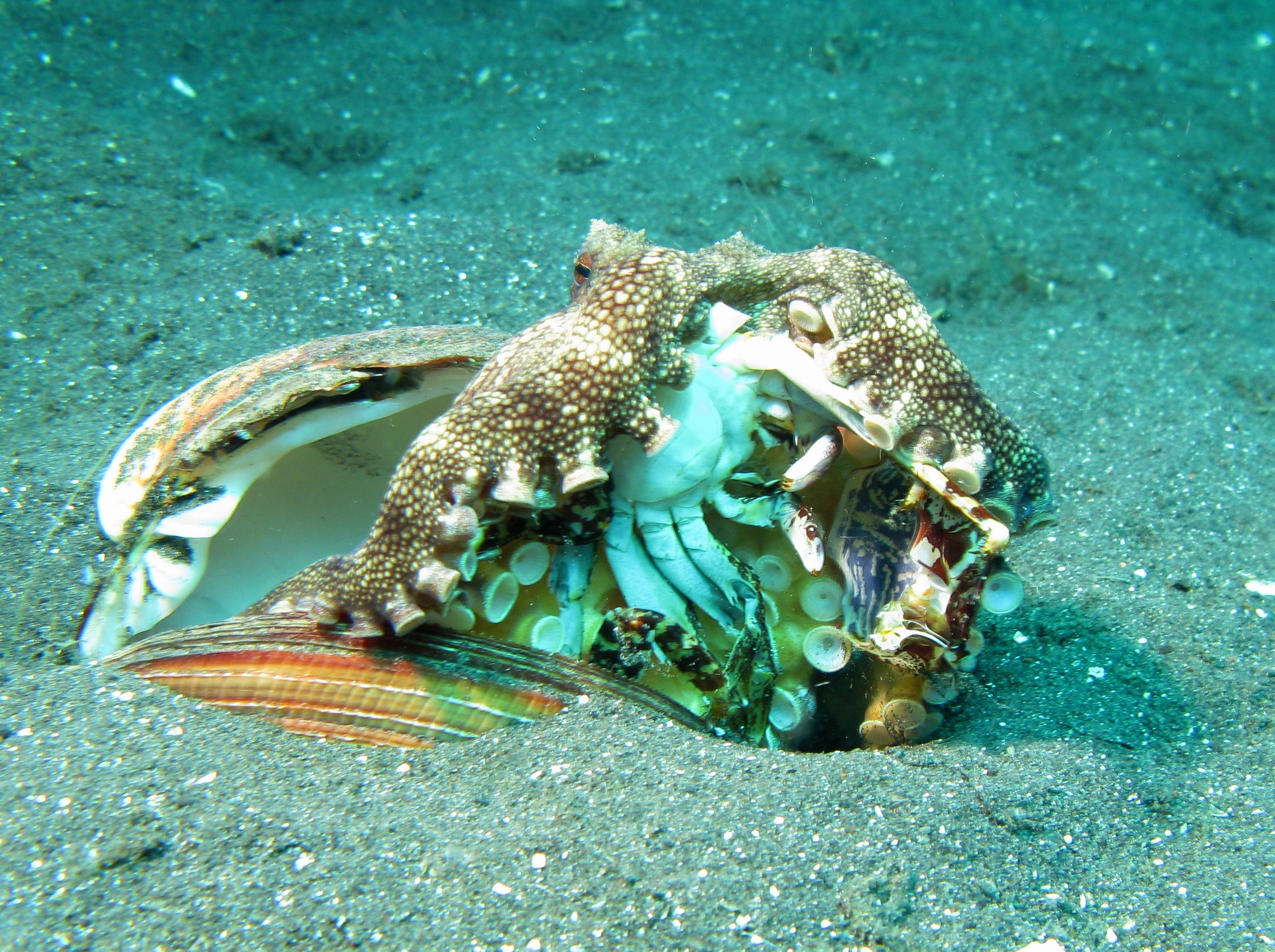
Veined octopus eating a crab

Octopuses are generally predatory and feed on prey such as crustaceans, bivalves, gastropods, fish, and other cephalopods, including members of the same species. Major items in the diet of the giant Pacific octopus include bivalves such as the cockle Clinocardium nuttallii, clams and scallops and crustaceans such as crabs. It typically rejects moon snails because they are too large; limpets, rock scallops, chitons and abalone, because they are too securely fixed to the rock. Small cirrate octopuses such as those of the genera Grimpoteuthis and Opisthoteuthis typically prey on polychaetes, copepods, amphipods and isopods.

Octopuses typically locate prey by feeling through their environment; some species hide and ambush their target. When prey tries to escape, the octopus jets after it. Octopuses may drill into the shells of crustaceans, bivalves and gastropods. It used to be thought that drilling was done by the radula, but it has now been shown that minute teeth at the tip of the salivary papilla are involved, and an enzyme in the toxic saliva is used to dissolve the calcium carbonate of the shell. This can take hours and once the shell is penetrated, the prey dies almost instantaneously. With crabs, tough-shelled species are more likely to be drilled, and soft-shelled crabs are torn apart.

Some species have other modes of feeding. Grimpoteuthis either lacks or has a small radula and swallows prey whole. In the deep-sea genus Stauroteuthis, the suckers in most species have been altered into photophores which are believed to fool prey by directing them to the mouth, making them one of the few bioluminescent octopuses.

=== Locomotion ===
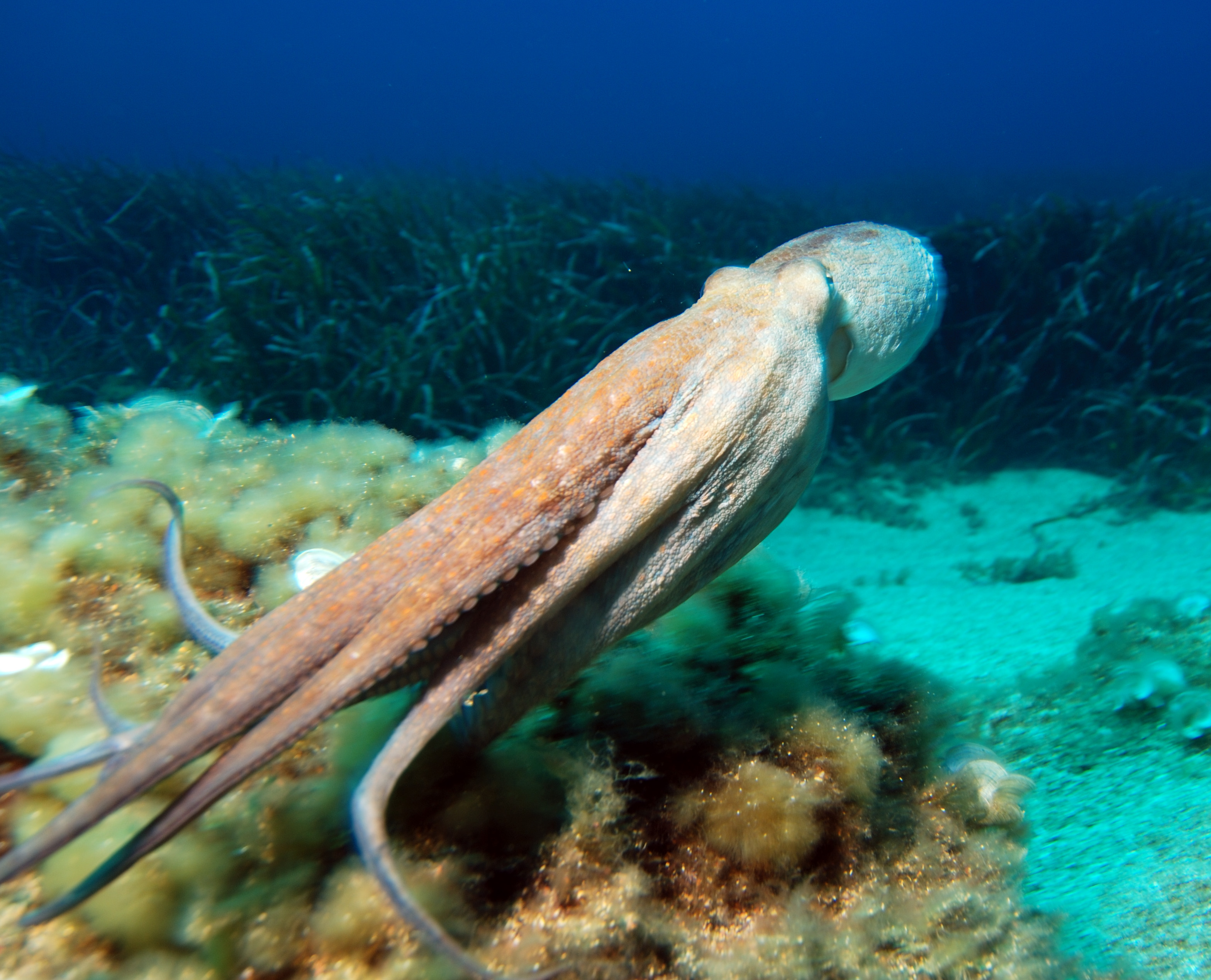
Octopuses swim with their arms trailing behind.

Octopuses mainly move about by relatively slow crawling with some swimming in a head-first position. Jet propulsion or backward swimming, is their fastest means of locomotion, while crawling is slowest. While crawling, the suckers adhere and detach from the substrate as the animal hauls itself forward with its powerful arm muscles. In 2005, Adopus aculeatus and veined octopus (Amphioctopus marginatus) were found to walk on two arms, while at the same time mimicking plant matter. This form of locomotion allows these octopuses to move quickly away from a potential predator without being recognised. Some species of octopus can crawl out of the water briefly, which they may do between tide pools. "Stilt walking" is used by the veined octopus when carrying stacked coconut shells. The octopus carries the shells underneath it with two arms, and progresses with an awkward gait supported by its remaining arms, which are stiffened.

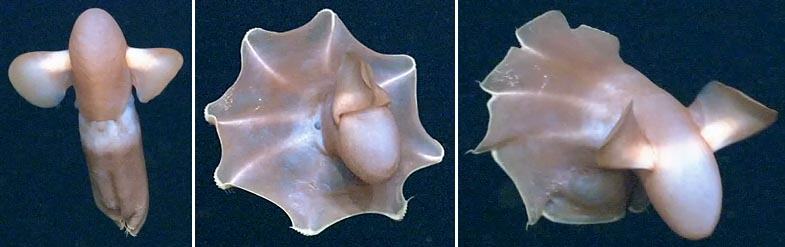
Movements of the finned species Cirroteuthis muelleri

Most octopuses swim by expelling a jet of water from the mantle through the siphon into the sea. The direction of travel depends on the orientation of the siphon. When swimming, the head is at the front and the siphon is pointed backward but, when jetting, the visceral hump leads, the siphon points at the head and the arms trail behind, with the animal presenting a fusiform appearance. In an alternative method of swimming, some species flatten themselves dorso-ventrally, and swim with the arms splayed; this may provide lift and be faster than normal swimming. Jetting is used to escape from danger, but is physiologically inefficient, requiring a mantle pressure so high as to stop the heart from beating, resulting in a progressive oxygen deficit.

Cirrate octopuses cannot produce jet propulsion and swim using their fins. Their neutrally buoyant bodies float along while the fins are spread. They can also contract their arms and surrounding web to make sudden moves known as "take-offs". Another form of locomotion is "pumping", which involves symmetrical contractions of muscles in their webs producing peristaltic waves, moving them slowly.

=== Intelligence ===
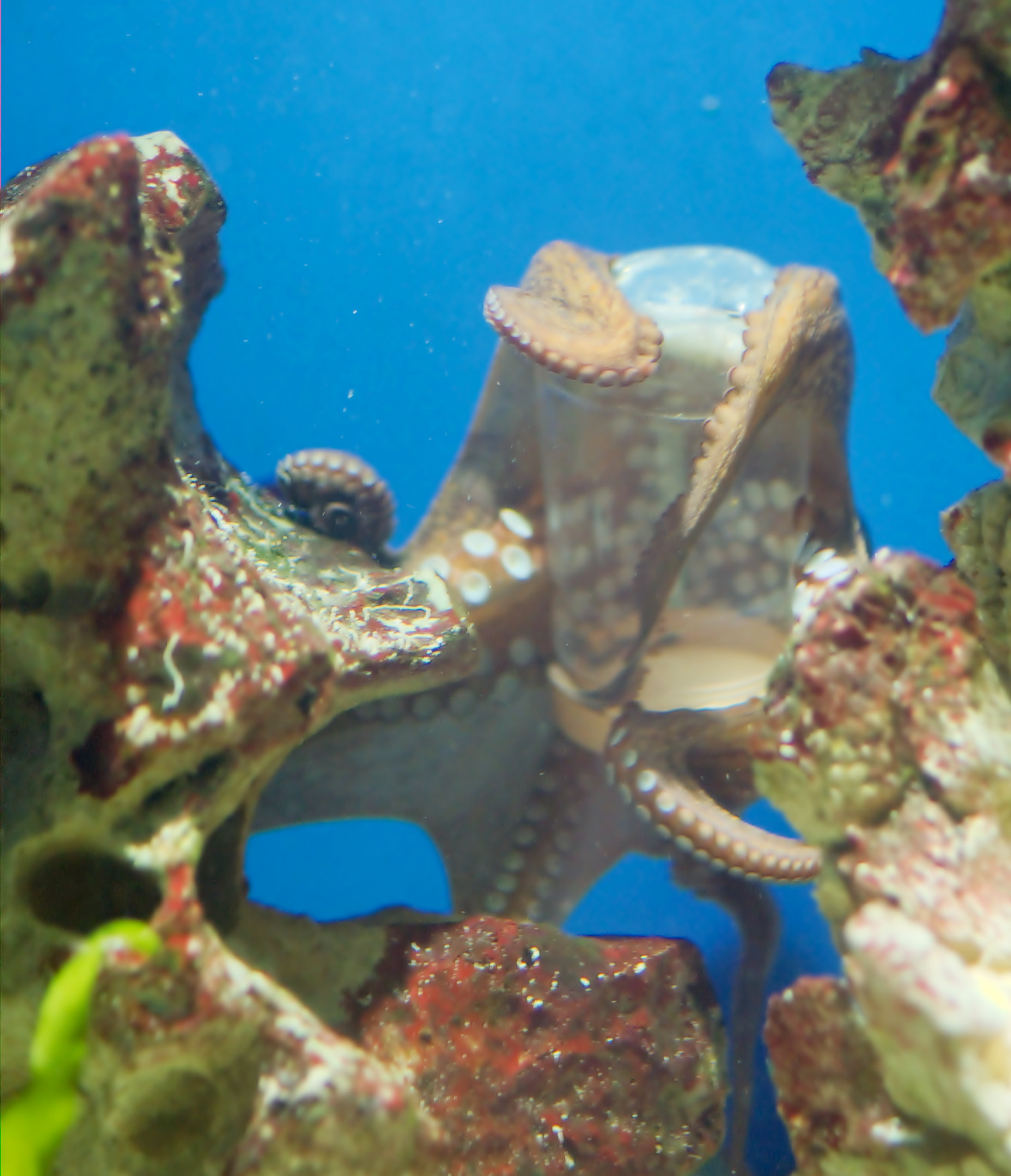
Octopus opening a container by unscrewing its cap

Octopuses are highly intelligent. Maze and problem-solving experiments have shown evidence of a memory system that can store both short- and long-term memory. In laboratory experiments, octopuses can readily be trained to distinguish between different shapes and patterns. They have been reported to practise observational learning, although the validity of these findings is contested. The veined octopus collects discarded coconut shells, then uses them to build a shelter, an example of tool use. Octopuses have also been observed in what has been described as play: including moving around a bottle by jetting water at it. Octopuses often break out of aquariums and sometimes into others in search of food. Interpretation of evidence has been used to suggest that octopuses have sentience and can feel pain.

=== Camouflage and colour change ===
Video of Octopus cyanea moving and changing its colour, shape, and texture

Octopuses use camouflage to hunt and to avoid predators. To do this, they use specialised skin cells that change colour. Chromatophores contain yellow, orange, red, brown, or black pigments; most species have three of these colours, while some have two or four. Other colour-changing cells are reflective iridophores and white leucophores. This colour-changing ability is also used to communicate with or warn other octopuses. The energy cost of the complete activation of the chromatophore system is high, nearly matching the energy used at rest.

Octopuses can create distracting patterns with waves of dark colouration across the body, a display known as the "passing cloud". Muscles in the skin change the texture of the mantle to achieve greater camouflage. In some species, the mantle can take on the bumpy appearance of algae-covered rocks. Diurnal, shallow water octopuses have more complex skin than their nocturnal and deep-sea counterparts. In the latter species, skin anatomy is limited to one colour or pattern.

Octopus' "moving rock" trick involves mimicking a rock and then inching across the open space with a speed matching that of the surrounding water.

=== Defence ===
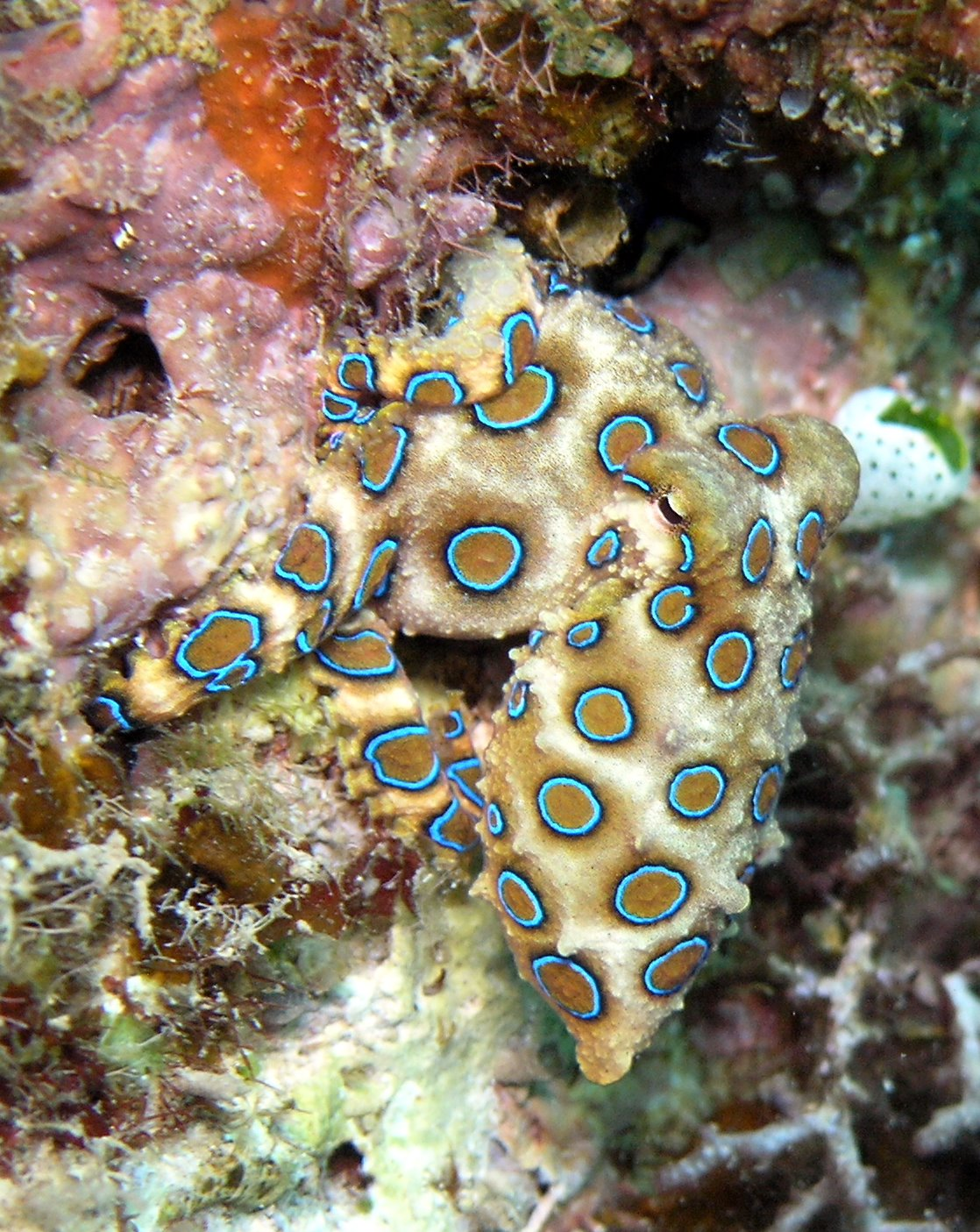
Warning display of greater blue-ringed octopus (Hapalochlaena lunulata)

Aside from humans, octopuses are prey for fishes, seabirds, sea otters, pinnipeds, cetaceans, and other cephalopods. Octopuses typically hide or disguise themselves by camouflage and mimicry; some have conspicuous warning coloration (aposematism) or deimatic behaviour ("bluffing" a threatening appearance). An octopus may hide in their dens for as much as 40% of the day. When the octopus is approached, it may reach out an arm to investigate. 66% of E. dofleini in one study had scars, with 50% missing arms. The blue rings of the venomous blue-ringed octopus are hidden in muscular skin folds which contract when the animal is threatened, revealing the iridescent warning. The Atlantic white-spotted octopus (Callistoctopus macropus) becomes redder with bright white spots in a deimatic display. Displays are often reinforced by stretching out the animal's arms, fins or web to make it look as big and threatening as possible.

Octopus try to escape from a predator by ejecting an ink cloud, which acts as a "smoke-screen" or a decoy, as well as to interfere with the attacker's sense of smell. When severed by a predator, some octopuses can detach their arm, which can grow back. Some octopuses, such as the mimic octopus, can combine their flexible bodies with their colour-changing ability to mimic other, more dangerous animals, such as lionfish, sea snakes, and eels.

=== Pathogens and parasites ===
Cephalopods are known to be the intermediate or final hosts of various parasitic cestodes, nematodes and copepods; 150 species of protistan and metazoan parasites are recognised. The Dicyemidae are a family of tiny worms found in the renal appendages of many species; it is unclear whether they are parasitic or endosymbionts. Coccidians in the genus Aggregata living in the gut cause serious illness in the host. Octopuses have an innate immune system; their haemocytes locate the foreign invader and attack it via phagocytosis, encapsulation, infiltration, or cytotoxicity. The haemocytes also contribute to healing injures. A gram-negative bacterium, Vibrio lentus, can cause skin lesions, exposure of muscle and sometimes death.

== Evolution ==
The scientific name Octopoda was first given as the order of octopuses in 1818 by English biologist William Elford Leach, who classified them as Octopoida the previous year. Octopoda consists of around 300 known species and were historically divided into two suborders, the Incirrina and the Cirrina. More recent evidence suggests cirrates are the most basal species, not a unique clade. The incirrate octopuses (the majority of species) lack the cirri and paired swimming fins of the cirrates. In addition, the internal shell of incirrates is either present as a pair of stylets or absent altogether.

=== Fossil history and phylogeny ===
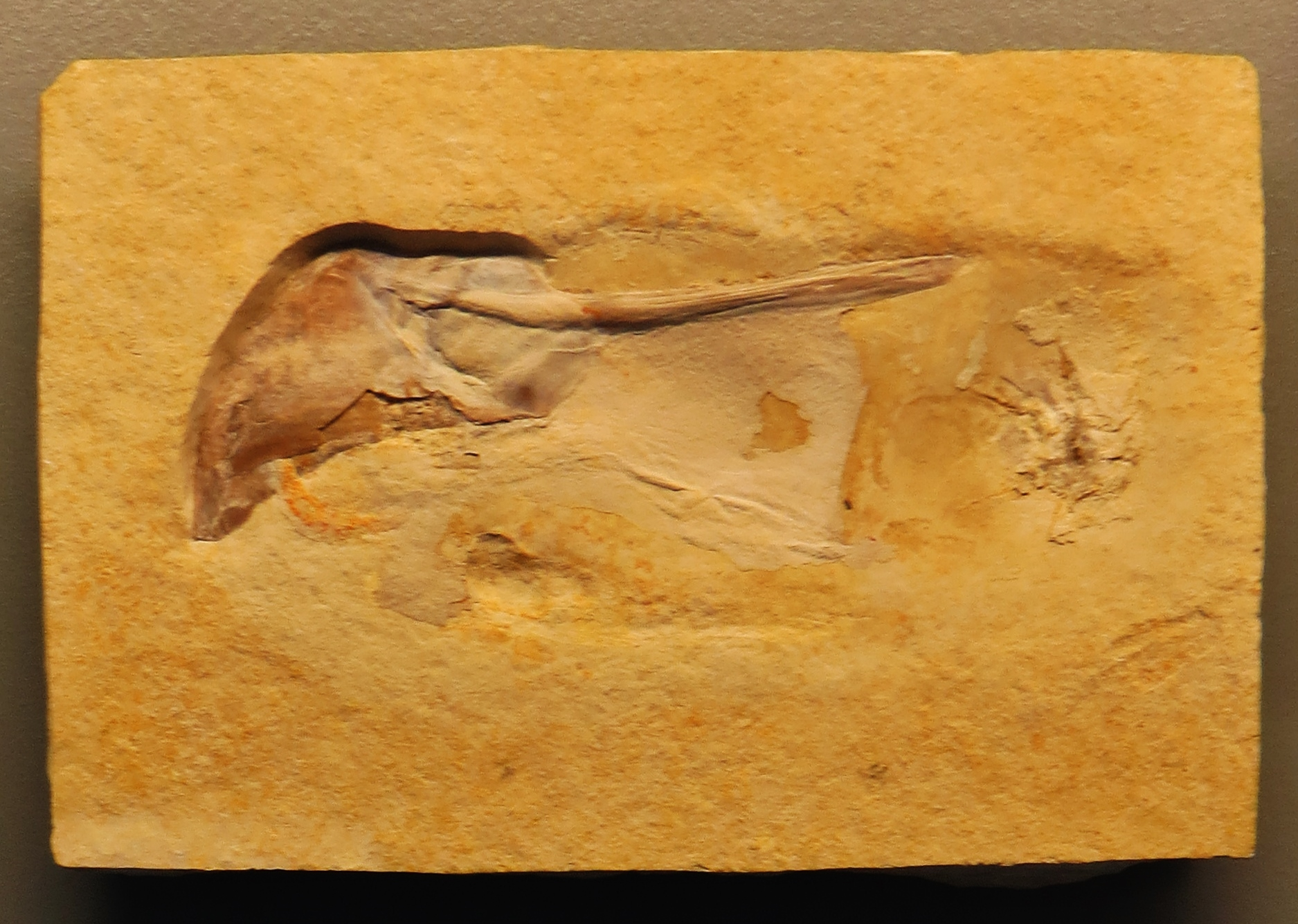
The octopuses evolved from the Muensterelloidea (fossil pictured) in the Jurassic period.

The Cephalopoda descended from a mollusc resembling the Monoplacophora in the Cambrian some 530 million years ago. The Coleoidea, which brought their shells inside the body, diverged from the nautiloids in the Devonian some 416 million years ago. Around 276 million years ago, during the Permian, the coleoids split into two groups, the Vampyropoda and the Decabrachia. The octopuses arose from the Muensterelloidea within the Vampyropoda in the Jurassic. The earliest octopus likely lived near the sea floor (benthic to demersal) in shallow marine environments. Octopuses consist mostly of soft tissue, and so fossils are relatively rare. As soft-bodied cephalopods, they lack the external shell of most molluscs, including other cephalopods like the nautiloids and the (extinct) Ammonoidea. They have eight limbs like other Coleoidea, but lack the extra specialised feeding appendages known as tentacles which are longer and thinner with suckers only at their club-like ends. The vampire squid (Vampyroteuthis) also lacks tentacles but has sensory filaments.

The cladograms are based on Sanchez et al., 2018, who created a molecular phylogeny based on mitochondrial and nuclear DNA marker sequences. The position of the Eledonidae is from Ibáñez et al., 2020, with a similar methodology. Divergence dates are from Kröger et al., 2011 and Fuchs et al., 2019.

- Cephalopods 530 mya
  - Nautiloids
    Nautilus
  - Coleoids 416 mya
    - Decabrachia
      Squids and cuttlefish
    - Vampyropoda 276 mya
      - Vampyromorphida
      - Octopods 155 mya

The molecular analysis of the octopods shows that the suborder Cirrina (Cirromorphida) and the superfamily Argonautoidea are paraphyletic and are broken up; these names are shown in quotation marks and italics on the cladogram.

- Octopoda
  - "Cirromorphida" part
    - Cirroteuthidae
    - Stauroteuthidae
  - - "Cirromorphida" part
      - Opisthoteuthidae
      - Cirroctopodidae
    - Octopodida
      - "Argonautoidea" part
        - Tremoctopodidae
        - Alloposidae
      - - - "Argonautoidea" part
            - Argonautidae
            - Ocythoidae
          - Octopodoidea
            - Eledonidae
            - - Bathypolypodidae
              - - Enteroctopodidae
                - - Octopodidae
                  - Megaleledonidae
        - - Bolitaenidae
          - - Amphitretidae
            - Vitreledonellidae

=== RNA editing and the genome ===
Octopuses, like other coleoid cephalopods but unlike more basal cephalopods or other molluscs, are capable of greater RNA editing, changing the nucleic acid sequence of the primary transcript of RNA molecules, than any other organisms. Much editing is done in the nervous system, particularly for excitability and neuronal morphology. Coleoids rely mostly on ADAR enzymes for RNA editing, which requires large, double-stranded RNA structures. The many editing sites are conserved in the coleoid genome and the mutation rates for the sites are hampered. Hence, greater transcriptome plasticity has come at the cost of slower genome evolution.

The genome of octopuses has also gone through several chromosomal fusions and rearrangements, unlike that of their closest relative the vampire squid, whose chromosomal structure is more basal and squid-like. The octopus genome is unremarkably bilaterian except for large developments of two gene families: protocadherins, which regulate the development of neurons; and the C2H2 zinc-finger transcription factors. Many novel genes in both cephalopods generally and octopus specifically manifest in the animals' skin, suckers, and nervous system.

== Relationship to humans ==
=== Cultural significance ===
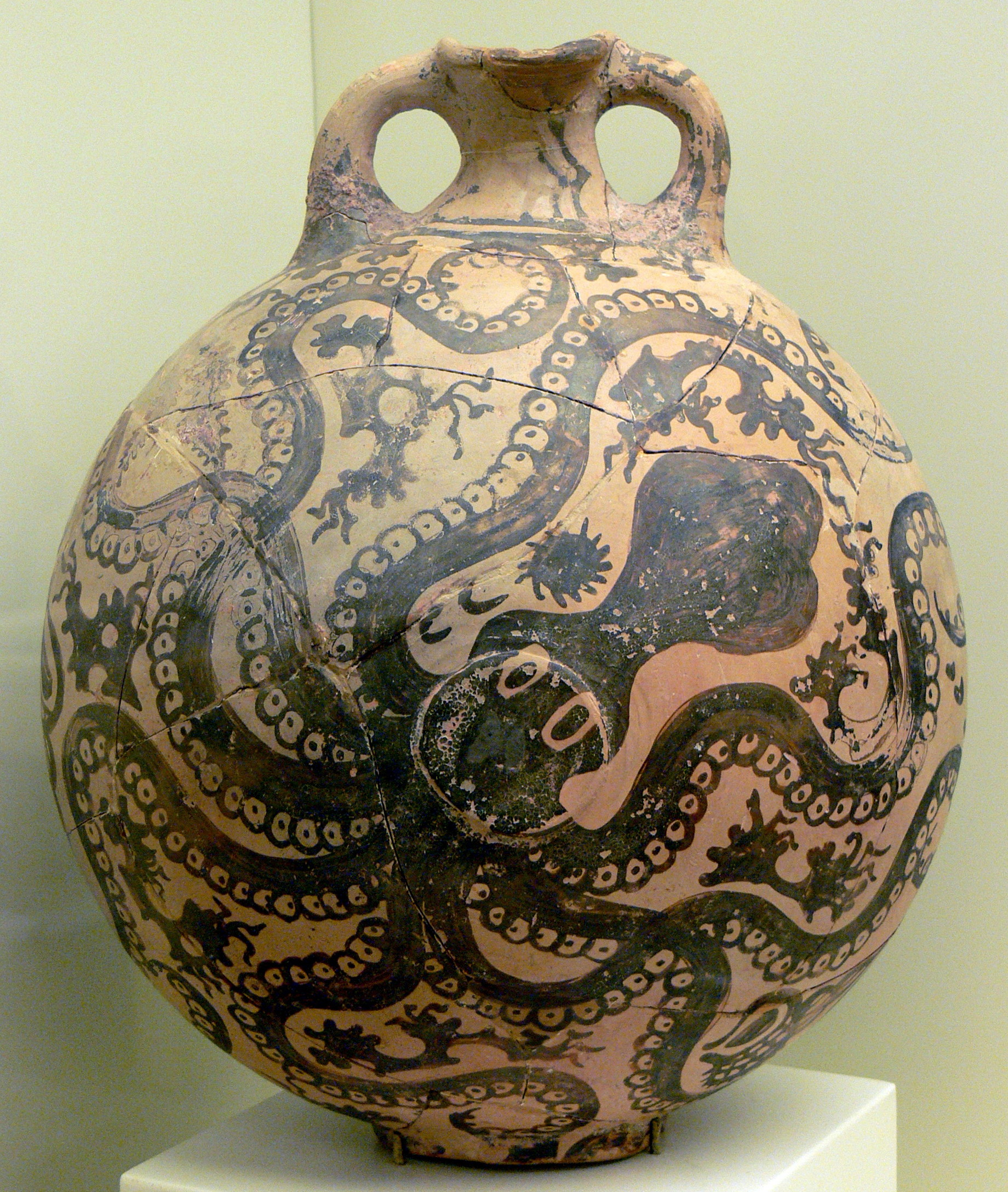
Minoan clay vase with octopus decoration, c. 1500 BC

Ancient seafaring people were aware of the octopus, as evidenced by artworks and designs. It was depicted on coins during the Minoan civilization possibly as early as 1650 BCE and on pottery in Mycenaean Greece around between 1200 and 1100 BCE. A Hawaiian creation myth suggests that the octopus is the lone survivor of a previous age. The legendary sea monster, the kraken is conceived as octopus-like. Similarly, Medusa was compared to an octopus, with her snake-hair resembling the creature's arms. The Akkorokamui is a gigantic octopus-like monster from Ainu folklore, worshipped in Shinto.

In the Asuka-era Japanese legend Taishokan, a female diver battles an octopus to recover a stolen jewel, which became the inspiration for woodblock printings. Similarly, in the 1973 novel Gravity's Rainbow an octopus named Grigori attacks a woman on the beach. A battle with an octopus plays a significant role in Victor Hugo's 1866 book Travailleurs de la mer (Toilers of the Sea). The octopus continues to be depicted as antagonistic in films such as Wake of the Red Witch (1948).

In political cartoons, octopuses have been used to symbolise empires and large organisations, the arms representing long reach. Octopuses also have an erotic appeal. Japanese erotic art, shunga, includes ukiyo-e woodblock prints such as Katsushika Hokusai's 1814 print Tako to ama (The Dream of the Fisherman's Wife), in which a woman is sexually intertwined with a large and a small octopus. This art style would inspire Pablo Picasso's 1903 drawing An Erotic Drawing: Woman and Octopus. Some individual octopuses gained celebrity status, notably Paul the Octopus who predicted the winners of the 2010 FIFA World Cup.

=== Danger to humans ===
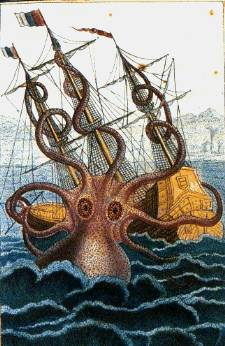
Pen and wash drawing of an imagined colossal octopus attacking a ship, by the malacologist Pierre de Montfort, 1801

Octopuses generally avoid humans, but some conflictual incidents have been verified. For example, a 2.4-metre (8 ft) Pacific octopus, said to be nearly perfectly camouflaged, "lunged" at a diver and "wrangled" over his camera before it let go. Another diver recorded the encounter on video. All species are venomous, but only blue-ringed octopuses have venom that is lethal to humans. Blue-ringed octopuses rank amongst the most dangerous marine animals; their bites are reported each year across the animals' range from Australia to the eastern Indo-Pacific Ocean. They bite only when provoked or accidentally touched; bites are small and usually painless. The venom appears to be able to penetrate the skin without a puncture, given prolonged contact. It contains tetrodotoxin, which causes paralysis by blocking the transmission of nerve impulses to the muscles. This causes death by respiratory failure leading to cerebral anoxia. No antidote is known, but if breathing can be kept going artificially, patients recover within 24 hours. Bites have been recorded from captive octopuses of other species; they leave temporary swellings.

=== As a food source ===
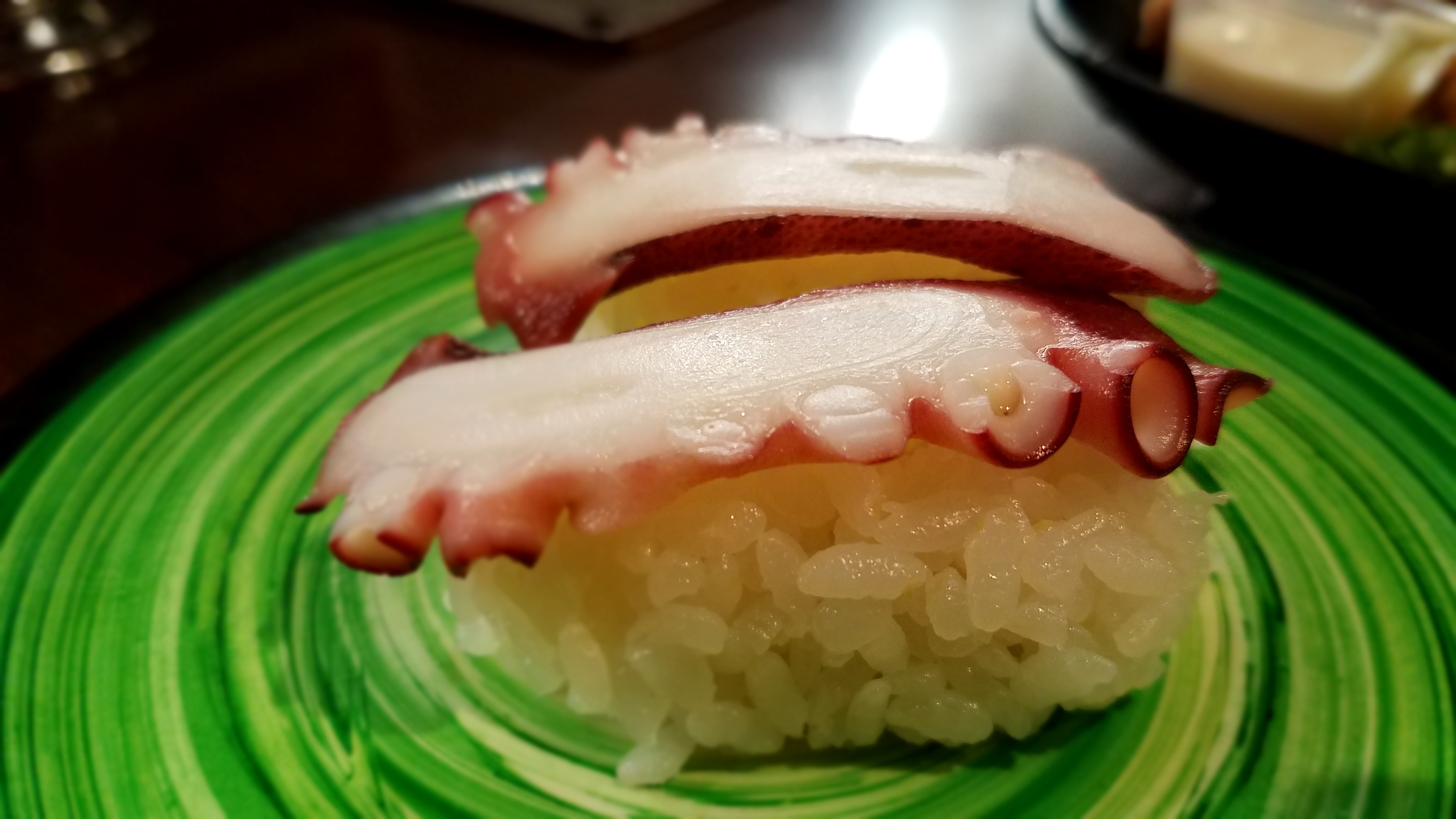
Octopus sushi

Octopuses are fished around the world and between 1988 and 1995, catches varied between 245,320 and 322,999 metric tons. The world catch peaked in 2007 at 380,000 tons, and had fallen by a tenth by 2012. Methods to capture octopuses include pots, trapping, trawling, snaring, drift fishing, spearing, hooking and catching by hands. Octopuses are also bycatch. Attempts to farm octopuses commercially are controversial.

Octopus is eaten in many cultures, such as those on the Mediterranean and Asian coasts. The arms and other body parts are prepared in ways that vary by species and geography. Live octopuses or their wriggling pieces are consumed as san-nakji in Korean cuisine. If not prepared properly, however, the severed arms can choke the diner with their suction cups, causing at least one death in 2010. Animal welfare groups have objected to the live consumption of octopuses on the basis that they can experience pain.

=== Science and technology ===
In classical Greece, Aristotle (384–322 BC) commented on their colour-changing abilities, both for camouflage and for signalling, in his Historia animalium: "The octopus ... seeks its prey by so changing its colour as to render it like the colour of the stones adjacent to it; it does so also when alarmed." Aristotle noted that the octopus had a hectocotyl arm and suggested it might be used in reproduction. This claim was widely ignored until the 19th century. It was described in 1829 by the French zoologist Georges Cuvier, who supposed it to be a parasitic worm, naming it as a new species, Hectocotylus octopodis. Other zoologists thought it a spermatophore; the German zoologist Heinrich Müller believed it was "designed" to detach during copulation. In 1856, the Danish zoologist Japetus Steenstrup demonstrated that it is used to transfer sperm, and only rarely detaches.

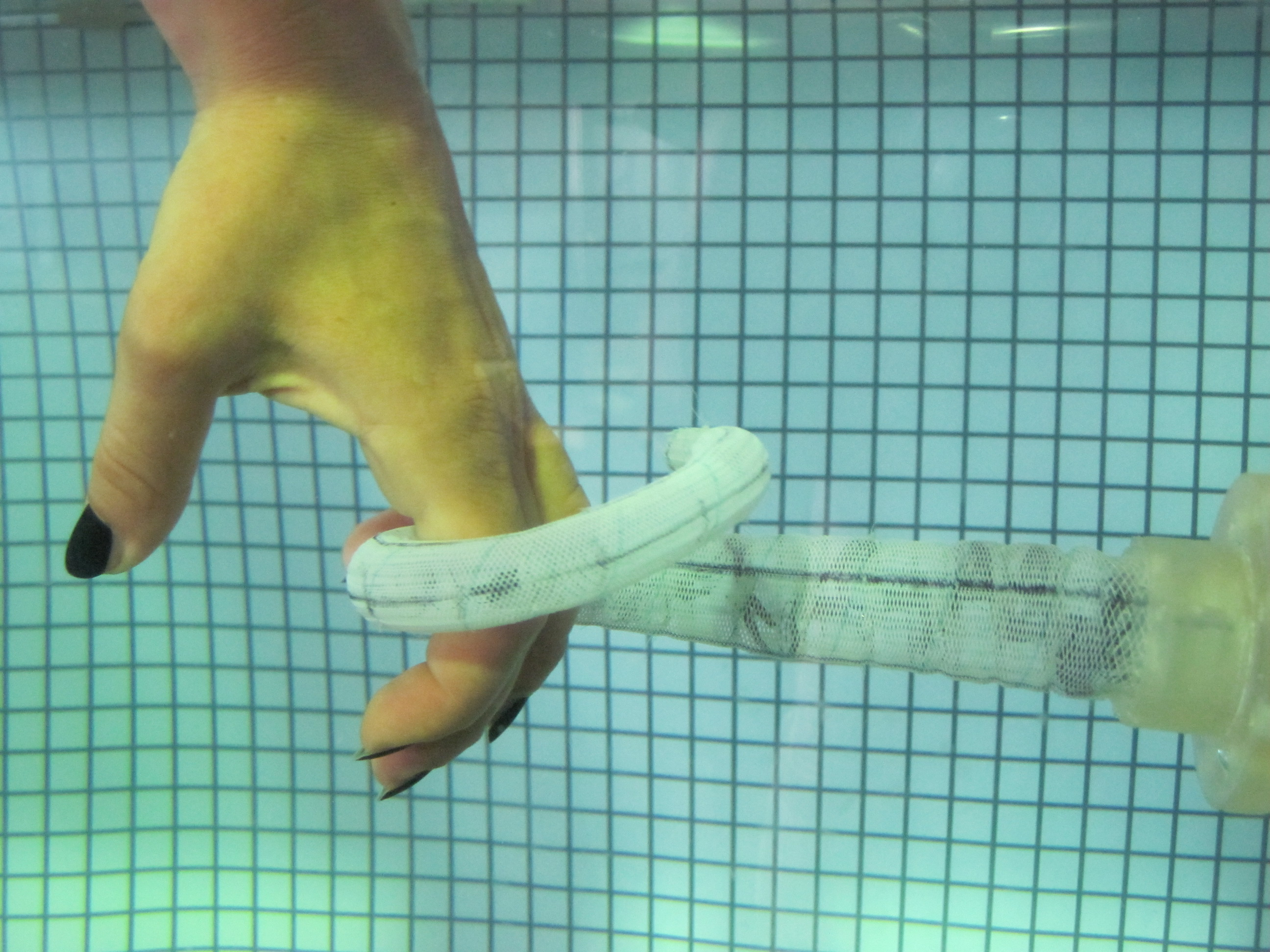
Flexible biomimetic 'Octopus' robotics arm. The BioRobotics Institute, Scuola Superiore Sant'Anna, Pisa, 2011

Octopuses offer many possibilities in biological research; the California two-spot octopus had its genome sequenced, allowing exploration of its molecular adaptations. Having independently evolved mammal-like intelligence, octopuses were compared by the philosopher Peter Godfrey-Smith, who studied the nature of intelligence, to hypothetical intelligent extraterrestrials. Their intelligence and flexible bodies enable them to escape from supposedly secure tanks in public aquariums.

Due to their intelligence, many argue that octopuses should be given protections when used for experiments. In the UK from 1993 to 2012, the common octopus (Octopus vulgaris) was the only invertebrate protected under the Animals (Scientific Procedures) Act 1986. In 2012, this legislation was extended to include all cephalopods in accordance with a general EU directive.

Some robotics research is exploring biomimicry of octopus features. Octopus arms can move and sense largely autonomously without intervention from the animal's central nervous system. In 2015 a team in Italy built soft-bodied robots able to crawl and swim, requiring only minimal computation. In 2017, a German company made an arm with a soft pneumatically controlled silicone gripper fitted with two rows of suckers. It was able to grasp objects such as a metal tube, a magazine, or a ball, and to fill a glass by pouring water from a bottle.

== See also ==
- My Octopus Teacher – 2020 documentary film by Pippa Ehrlich and James Reed
