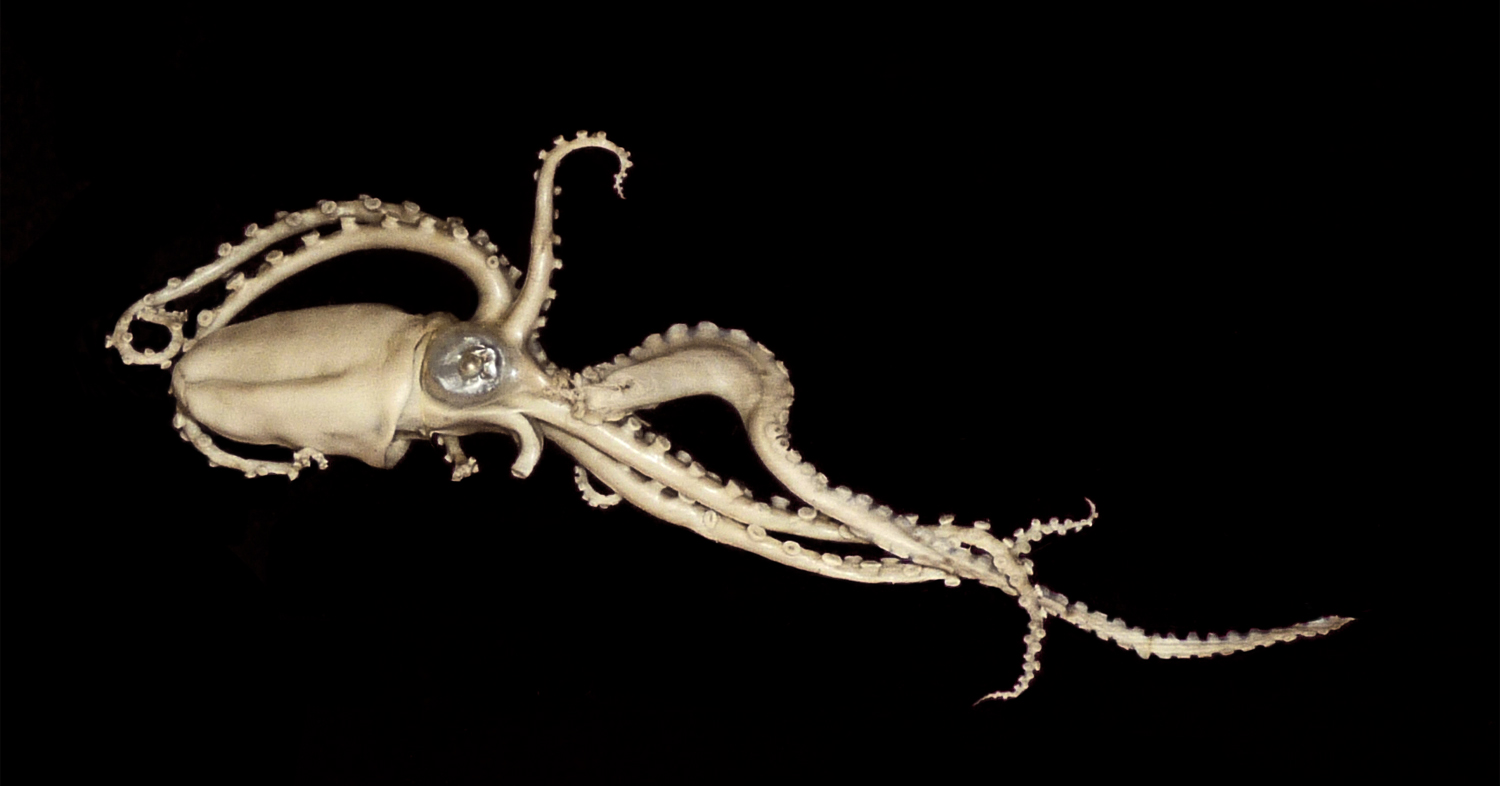
- Specimen preserved in formaldehyde
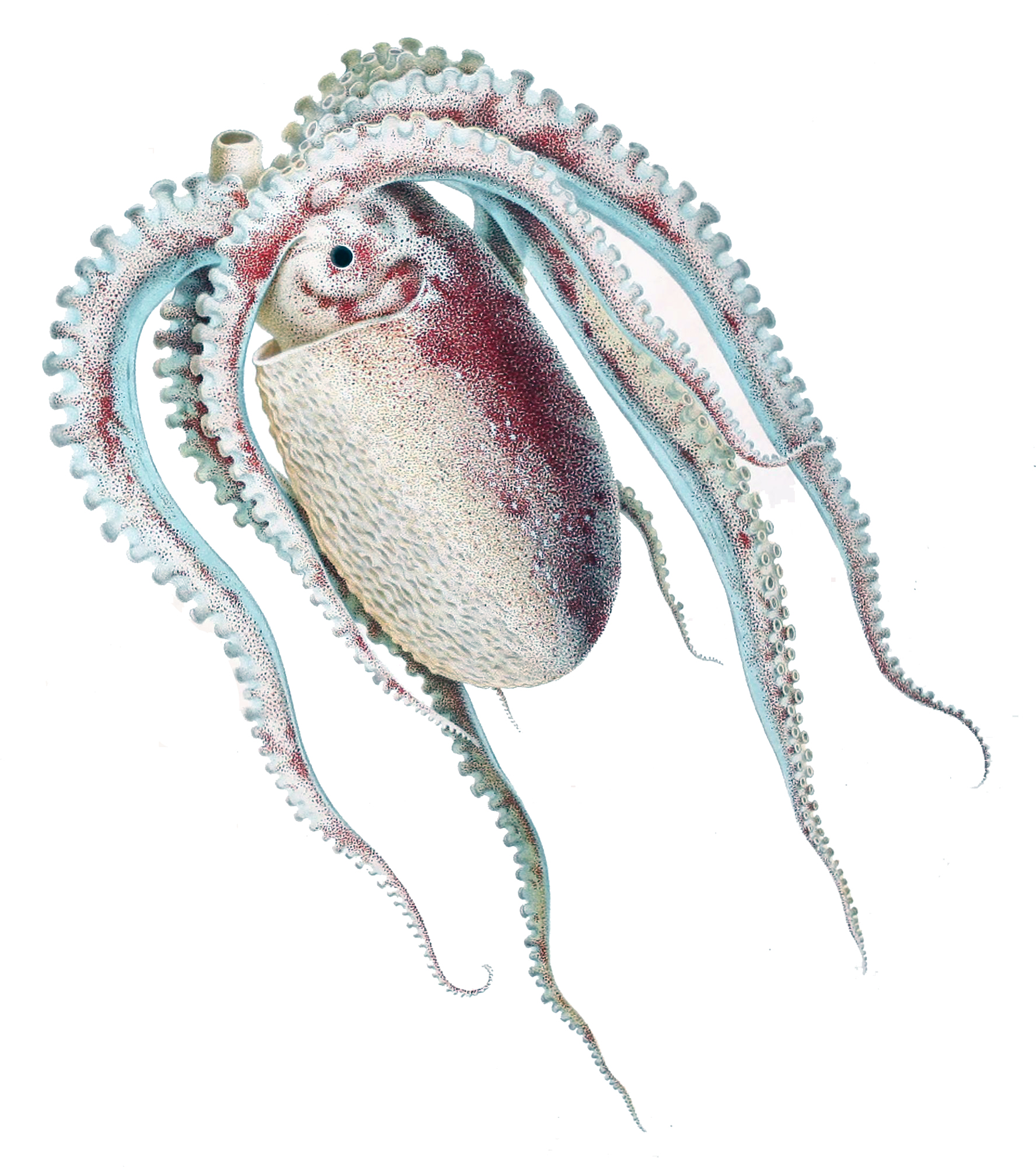

Conservation status
- Least Concern (IUCN 3.1)

Scientific classification
- Kingdom: Animalia
- Phylum: Mollusca
- Class: Cephalopoda
- Order: Octopoda
- Superfamily: Argonautoidea
- Family: Ocythoidae; Gray, 1849
- Genus: Ocythoe; Rafinesque, 1814
- Species: O. tuberculata

Binomial name
- Ocythoe tuberculata Rafinesque, 1814

Synonyms
- Octopus carenae Vérany, 1839; Octopus catenulatus Philippi, 1844; Octopus reticularis Petangna, 1828; Octopus tuberculatus Risso, 1854; Octopus veranyi Wagner, 1829; Octopus violaceus Risso, 1854; Tremoctopus doderleini Ortmann, 1888

= Ocythoe =

Tuberculate pelagic octopus

Species of cephalopods

Ocythoe tuberculata, also known as the tuberculate pelagic octopus or football octopus, is a pelagic octopus. It is the only known species in the family Ocythoidae.

Ocythoe tuberculata is found in warm and temperate seas, especially in the Northern Hemisphere, such as the North Pacific Ocean off California.

== Description ==
=== Morphology ===
Ocythoe are one of the few cephalopods to have a swimbladder. In captivity, two specimens were observed controlling their buoyancy and shooting water "forwards, upwards, sideways, and backwards" from the upper channel of the mantle cavity. Ocythoe achieves this by altering the dorso-lateral corners of the mantle opening. The entire swimbladder structure rests on the "visceral mass" and connects to the mantle cavity. It is also innervated and vascular. Juvenile and adult swimbladders exhibit key differences. Juveniles tend to have thicker and "gelatinous" walls with more spherical cells. Adults on the other hand have a less gelatinous appearance and a constitutively open lumen. Dwarf males do not possess swimbladders. Ocythoe is the only cephalopod to possess a proper gas bladder, based on specimens kept in captivity, although the origins of the gas is still an area of research.

=== Sexual dimorphism ===
Female and male tuberculate pelagic octopuses have distinct morphological differences. Females exhibit a larger dorsal mantle length upon maturity around 300 millimeters, while males only reach a dorsal mantle length of around 30 millimeters. The females are around 1 m (3.3 ft) long when full-grown. The males are considerably smaller, around 10 cm (3.9 in). Males also have a well-developed hectocotylus on the third arm. This structure contains the spermatophores and is dislodged and detached in the mantle of the female during mating and remains for an extended period of time for fertilization.

Young females and mature males have been observed residing inside salps, although little is known about this relationship.

=== Distribution ===
O. tuberculata have been well known for inhabiting mainly northern hemisphere waters, typically in the Mediterranean Sea, as well as the eastern and western parts of the North Atlantic. O. tuberculata has also been found in the northern Pacific waters, with very few individuals found in the southern hemisphere, either in the Indian or Pacific oceans. O. tuberculata has typically been found in warmer waters. There is some speculation that warm ocean currents moving eastward from the Indian Ocean are responsible for the small sample of specimens found in northern pacific waters, but this has yet to be confirmed or denied.

O. tuberculata is a near-surface dwelling pelagic octopus, living between depths of 100 and 200 meters.

== Lifespan and reproduction ==
Female tuberculate pelagic octopuses are known to have a high fecundity, producing nearly 100,000 eggs. One female specimen caught in May 2003 had a record-breaking 1 million eggs, the most of any Octopoda. Egg size is typically very small, measuring 1.75 mm long and 1.00 mm wide. This has been seen as a trend in other pelagic octopus species. Tuberculate pelagic octopuses is said to be viviparous, meaning their offspring develop with in the body of the parent. However, several different authors dispute exactly how and where this development occurs. The general consensus is the eggs develop in expanded oviducts. Fertilization occurs when the hectocotylus is deposited from the male in the female's mantle cavity.

== Diet ==
The diet of Ocythoe is undocumented, however most octopuses are predatory. It is known that open ocean octopuses typically feed on prawns, fish, or other cephalopods.

== Predators ==
There are a number of known predators that prey on Ocythoe. These are lancet fishes (Alepisaurus borealis and A. ferox), tunas (Thunnus alalunga, T. thunnus, and Germon germon), and Risso's dolphin (Grampus griseus). These predators have a large vertical range, and typically prey on O. tuberculata between 100 and 200 meters.

== Gallery ==
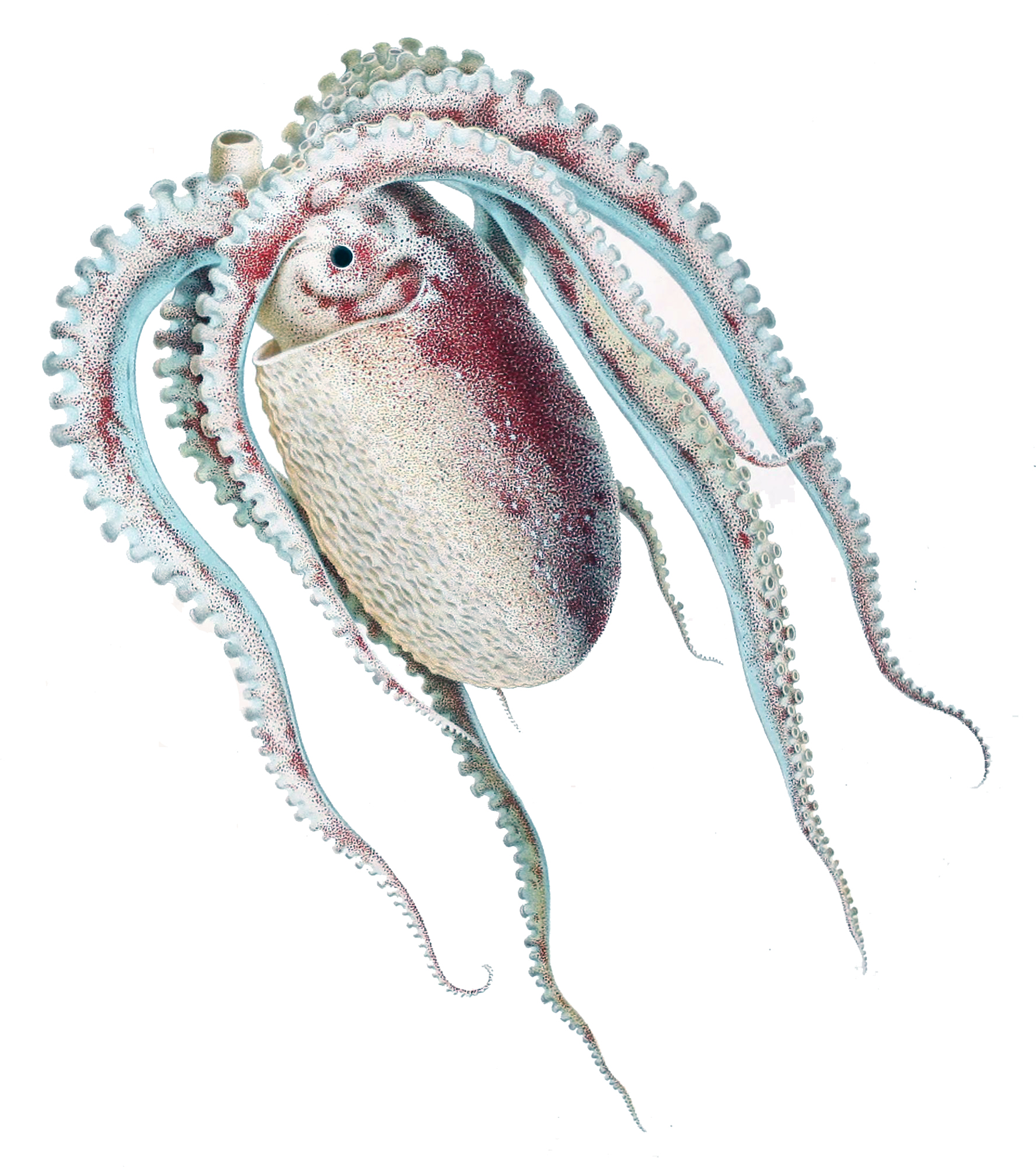
Male with attached hectocotylus that has broken free from its sac

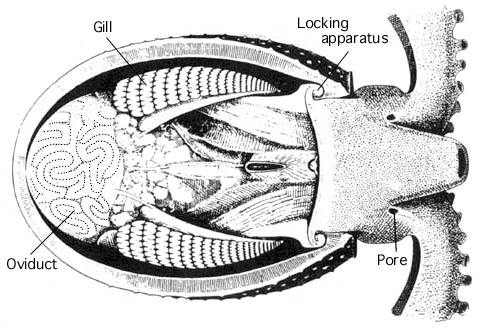
Cut-away drawing of the viscera

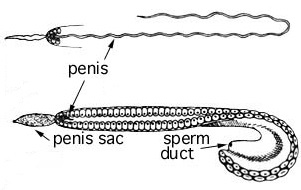
Details of the hectocotylus

O. tuberculata paralarva
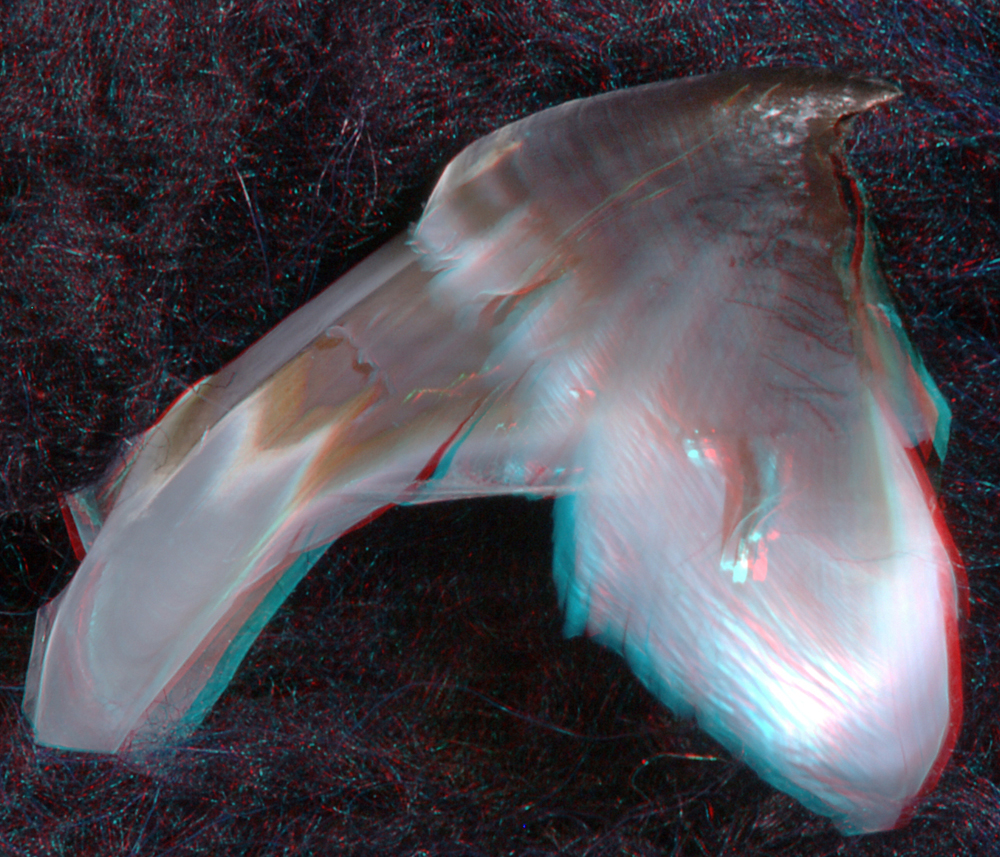
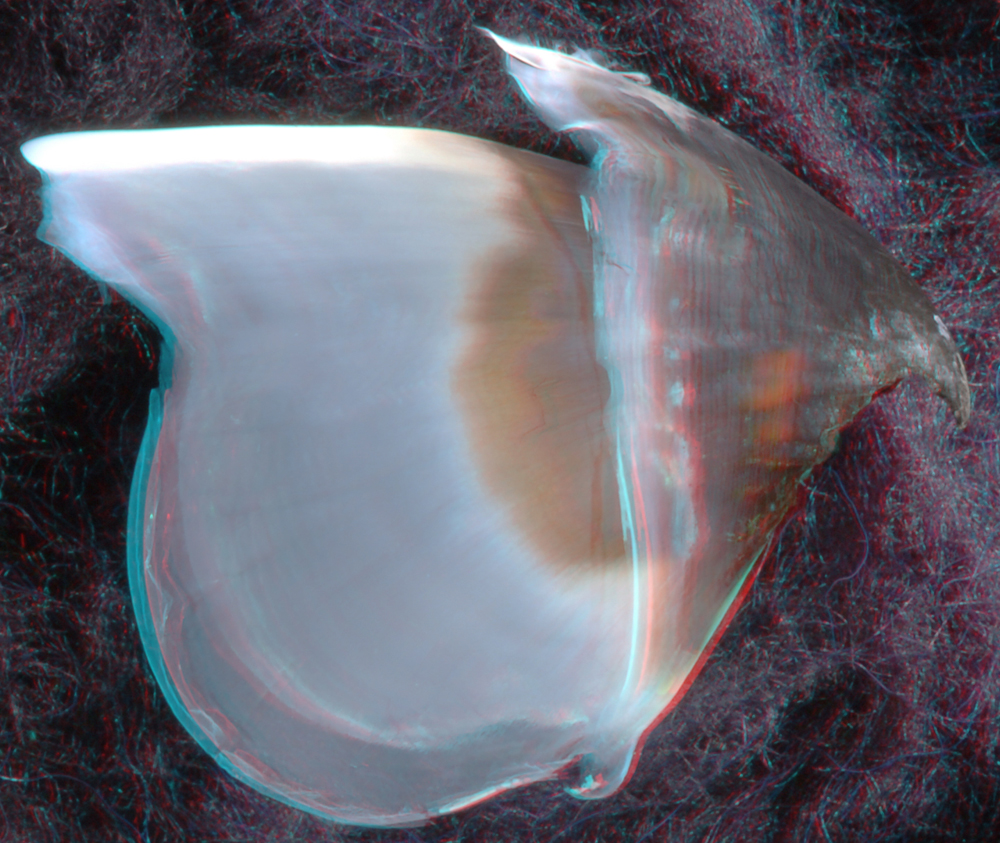
Lower (left) and upper beaks of female Ocythoe tuberculata in lateral view
3D red cyan glasses are recommended to view this image correctly.
