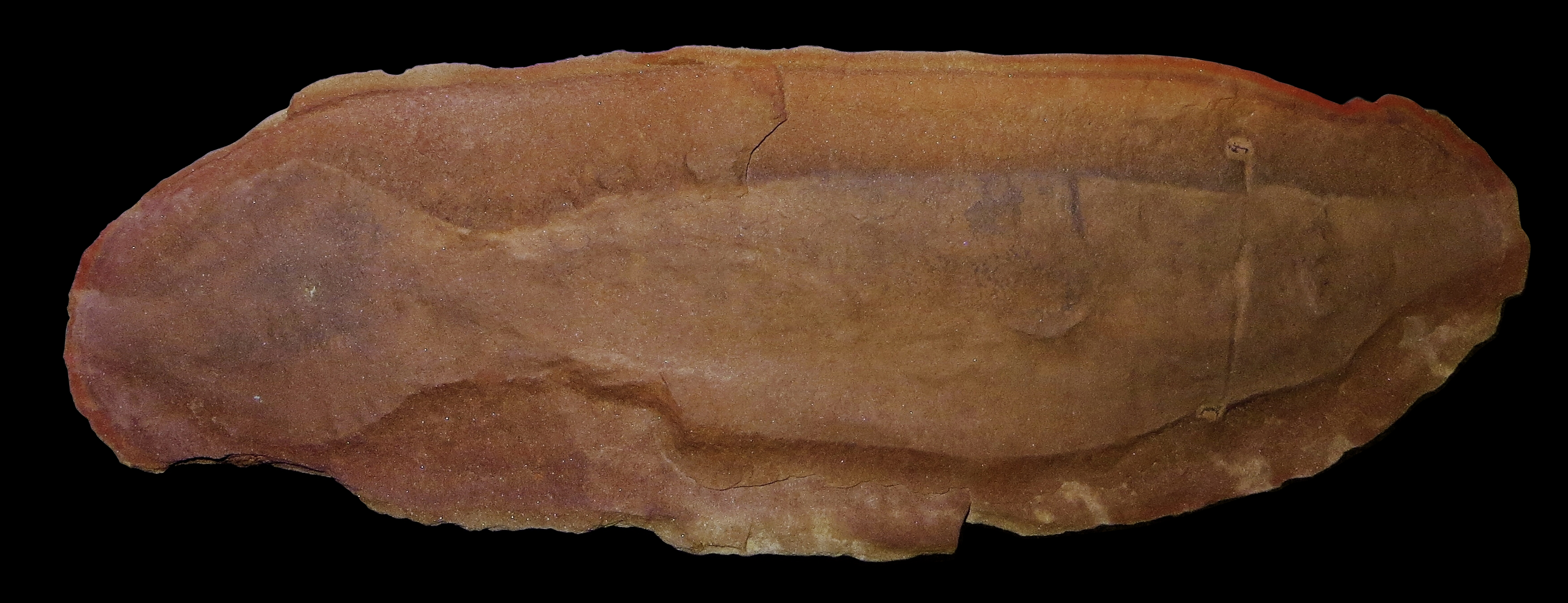
- Specimen of Tullimonstrum gregarium showing stalked structures

Scientific classification
- Kingdom: Animalia
- Subkingdom: Eumetazoa
- Clade: ParaHoxozoa
- Clade: Bilateria
- Phylum: incertae sedis
- Genus: †Tullimonstrum; Richardson, 1966

Type species
- †Tullimonstrum gregarium Richardson, 1966

Synonyms
- Nemavermes mackeei Schram, 1973

= Tullimonstrum =

Tullimonstrum Temporal range: Pennsylvanian (Moscovian to Kasimovian), 311–306 Ma

Extinct genus of soft-bodied sea animals

Tullimonstrum, colloquially known as the Tully monster or sometimes Tully's monster, is an extinct genus of soft-bodied bilaterian marine animal that lived in shallow tropical coastal waters of muddy estuaries during the Pennsylvanian, about 310 million years ago. A single species, T. gregarium, is known. Examples of Tullimonstrum have been found only in sediments deposited far from the palaeocoast (formally termed the Essex biota), in the Mazon Creek fossil beds of Illinois, United States. Its classification has been the subject of controversy, and interpretations of the fossil have likened it to molluscs, arthropods, conodonts, worms, tunicates, and vertebrates. This creature had a mostly cigar-shaped body, with a triangular tail fin, two long stalked eyes, and a proboscis tipped with a mouth-like appendage. Based on the fossils, it seems this creature was a nektonic carnivore that hunted in the ocean's water column. When Tullimonstrum was alive, Illinois was a mixture of ecosystems like muddy estuaries, marine environments, rivers and lakes.

== Description ==
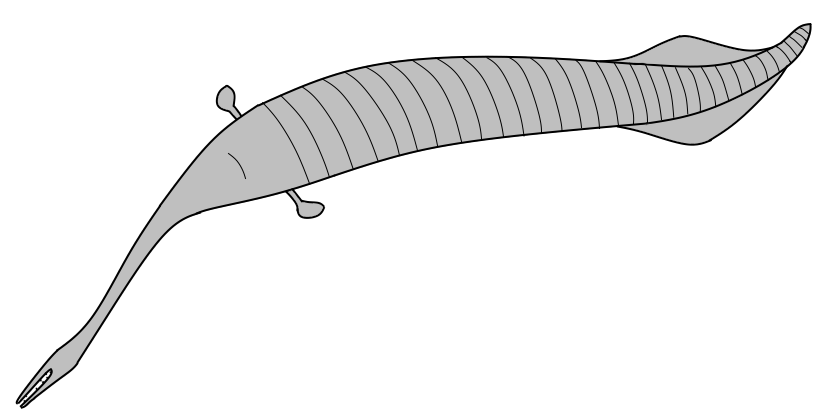
Reconstruction of Tullimonstrum according to Johnson et al. (1969)

Tullimonstrum probably reached lengths of up to 35 centimeters (14 in); the smallest individuals are about 8 cm (3.1 in) long.

Tullimonstrum had a pair of vertical, ventral fins (though the fidelity of preservation of fossils of its soft body makes this difficult to determine) situated at the tail end of its body, and typically featured a long proboscis with up to eight small sharp teeth on each "jaw", with which it may have actively probed for small creatures and edible detritus in the muddy bottom. It was part of the ecological community represented in the unusually rich group of soft-bodied organisms found among the assemblage called the Mazon Creek fossils from their site in Grundy County, Illinois.

The absence of hard parts in the fossil implies that the animal did not possess organs composed of bone, chitin or calcium carbonate. There is evidence of serially repeated internal structures. Its head is poorly differentiated. A transverse bar-shaped structure, which was either dorsal or ventral, terminates in two round organs which are associated with dark material which have been identified as melanosomes (containing the pigment melanin). Their form and structure is suggestive of a camera-type eye. Tullimonstrum possessed structures which have been interpreted as gills, and a possible notochord or rudimentary spinal cord.

== History of discovery ==
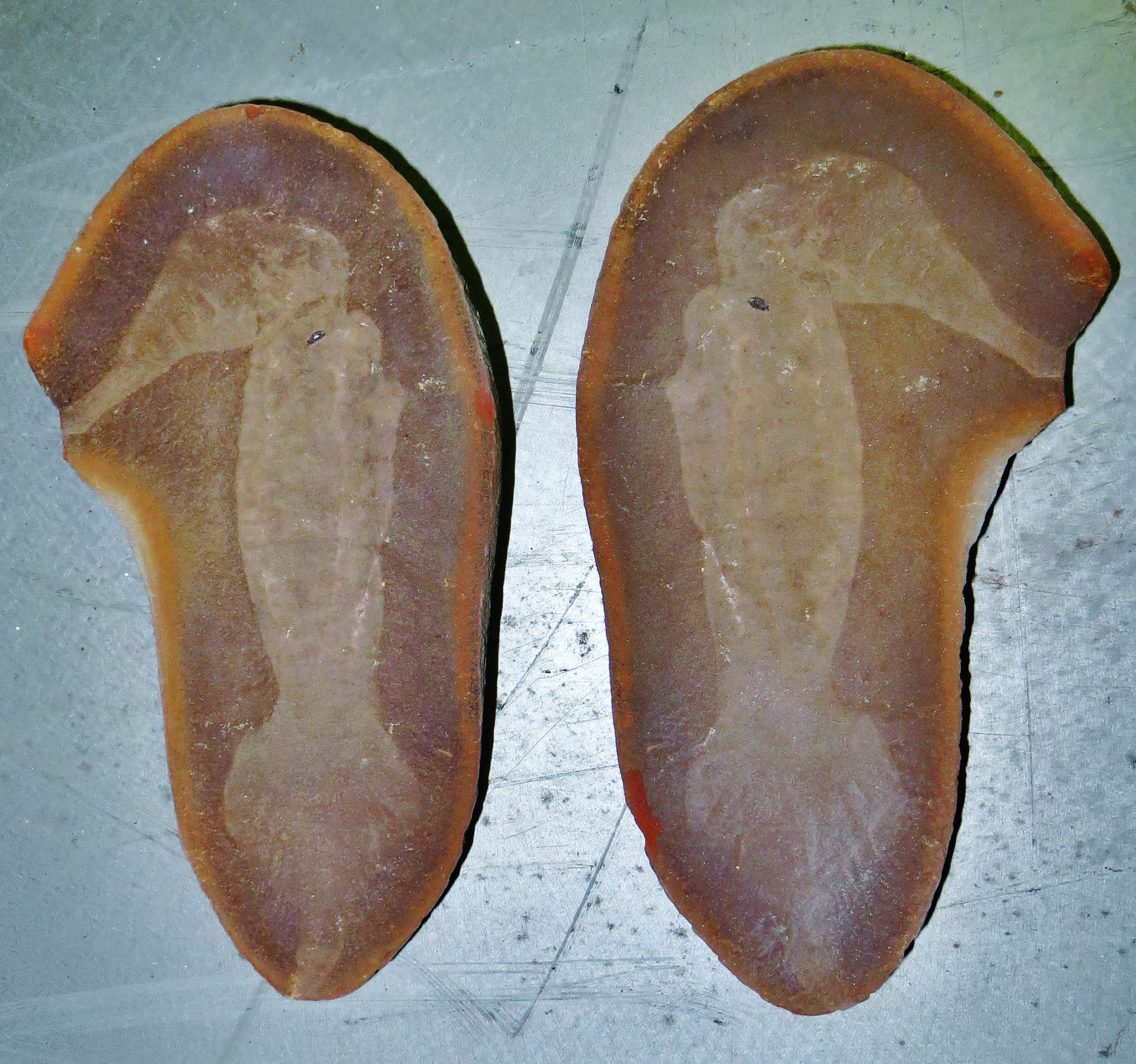
T. gregarium fossil (part and counterpart)

Amateur collector Francis Tully found the first of these fossils in 1955 in a fossil bed known as the Mazon Creek formation. He took the strange creature to the Field Museum of Natural History, but paleontologists were stumped as to which phylum Tullimonstrum belonged to. The species Tullimonstrum gregarium ("Tully's common monster"), as these fossils later were named, takes its genus name from Tully, whereas the species name, gregarium, means "common", and reflects its abundance within the formation. The term monstrum ("monster") relates to the creature's outlandish appearance and strange body plan.

The fossil remains "a puzzle", and interpretations liken it to a worm, a mollusc, an arthropod, a conodont, or a vertebrate. Since it appears to lack characteristics of the well-known modern phyla, some speculate that it was representative of a stem group to one of the many phyla of worms that are poorly represented today. Similarities with Cambrian fossil organisms were noted. Chen et al. suggested similarities to Nectocaris pteryx. Others pointed to a general resemblance between Tullimonstrum and Opabinia regalis, although Cave et al. notes that they were too morphologically dissimilar to be related.

== Classification ==
The classification of Tullimonstrum has been an ongoing debate since the creature was first described, with many scientists presenting evidence of a vertebrate affinity, and others of an invertebrate affinity.

=== Arguments in favor of vertebrate affinities ===
In 2016 two studies were released simultaneously suggesting that Tullimonstrum may have been a basal vertebrate, thus a member of the phylum Chordata.

==== McCoy et al. (2016) ====
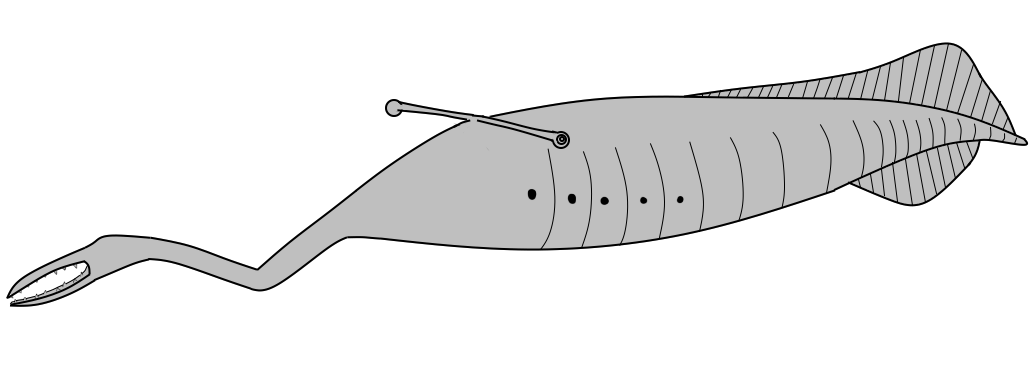
Reconstruction of Tullimonstrum as vertebrate, according to McCoy et al. (2016)

McCoy et al. undertook a morphological study of several specimens; their analysis indicated that Tullimonstrum may be closely related to modern lampreys. This affinity was attributed based on pronounced cartilaginous vertebral structures known as arcualia, a dorsal fin and asymmetric caudal fin, keratinous teeth, a single nostril, and tectal cartilages like in lampreys. While McCoy et al. raised the possibility that Tullimonstrum belong to the ancestral group of lamprey, it also has many features not found in Cyclostomes (lampreys and hagfishes).

==== Clements et al. (2016) ====
Clements et al. (2016) examined the eye anatomy of Tullimonstrum, concluding that the camera-like eye, with preserved lenses and the presence of cylindrical and spheroid melanosomes arranged in distinct layers, was indicative of a stem-vertebrate affinity. These ocular pigments and their unique structure was interpreted to be a retinal pigmented epithelium (RPE), offering strong support that the bar organs were indeed eyes. The dark pigments in the eye were chemically tested and found to be fossilized melanin, as opposed to ommochromes or pterins (which are ocular pigments used by many invertebrate groups). While the authors admitted that the ocular pigments of many invertebrate groups have been poorly investigated, at the time of publication the presence of RPE and two distinct melanosome morphology is a uniquely vertebrate trait.

==== McCoy et al. (2020); Wiemann et al. (2022) ====
In 2020, McCoy, Wiemann and colleagues used Raman spectroscopy to identify the molecular bonds present in the organic material preserved with Tullimonstrum. Based on samples from multiple points in the body, they identified the organic material as representing the decay products of chordate tissues as opposed to the polysaccharide-based chitin (as is seen in arthropods), offering independent and rather unambiguous evidence for the interpretation that Tullimonstrum is a chordate or vertebrate. In 2022, Wiemann and colleagues replicated these spectral signals in collaboration with independent laboratories using Fourier-Transform Infrared spectroscopy. Comparable tissue signatures have been detected in preserved carbonaceous remains of a diversity of other animals.

=== Arguments in favour of non-vertebrate affinities ===
==== Sallan et al. (2017) ====
In 2017 Sallan et al. rejected the identification of the Tully monster as a vertebrate. Firstly, they noted that even the presence of the two melanosome types is variable among vertebrates; hagfish lack them altogether, and extant sharks as well as extinct forms found in the Mazon Creek area, such as Bandringa, only have spheroid melanosomes. Additionally, the supposed notochord extends in front of the level of the eyes, which is not the case in any other vertebrate, although is seen in lancelets. Even if the structure was a notochord, the presence of notochords is not limited to vertebrates either.

Further criticism was drawn towards the identification of the blocks of the body variously as gill pouches and muscle blocks (myomeres), despite the lack of differentiation in the structure of these blocks. In vertebrates, myomeres are also thinner, and extend along the whole length of the body rather than stopping short of the head. Meanwhile, the gill pouches of lampreys are paired extensions rather than segmented structures, and are usually embedded in a complex gill skeleton, neither of which is the case in Tullimonstrum.

Other identifications of soft-tissue structures were considered as being equally problematic. The supposed brain has no associated nervous tissue and is not connected to the eyes, and the purported liver was located under the gills as opposed to being further back as in other vertebrates. The "mouth" at the front of the proboscis was described as possessing gnathostome-like distinct tooth rows, despite lampreys having "tooth fields" on the interior of the mouth. This would necessitate the convergent re-evolution of grasping jaws.

An additional difficulty is that the thin and jointed proboscis is inconsistent with the feeding methods typically used for open-water vertebrates: either ram or suction feeding. The gill pouches would have obstructed the flow of water even further.

Sallan et al. note that stalked eyes, tail fins, and brains are also present in anomalocaridids, and that Opabinia also has a similar proboscis. Previously arthropod affinities were rejected under the presumption that other Mazon Creek arthropods are preserved in three-dimensions, with carbonization of the exoskeleton, but the arthropods are not actually preserved in that manner. They also suggested that molluscs convergently evolved complex camera-like eyes containing melanosomes, but proponents of the vertebrate interpretation argue that no molluscs are known that have or had melanosomes in two distinct forms. Further similarities (such as the lobed brain, muscle bands, tail fin, proboscis, and "teeth") could support possible molluscan affinities.

==== Rogers et al. (2019) ====
Regardless, Rogers et al. (2019) demonstrated that certain squid (Loligo vulgaris) and cuttlefish (Sepia officinalis) species do in fact have two different melanosome forms, which could collapse during decay to look like an RPE-like layer, similar to that observed in vertebrates and Tullimonstrum fossils. On a plot of trace metal signatures in the eyes of Mazon Creek fossils, Tullimonstrum is clearly distinct from both vertebrates (which have a higher concentration of zinc) and the eyespots of the putative cephalopod Pohlsepia (however, no evidence of melanosomes were found in Pohlsepia) – although these signals are influenced by the fossilisation process. The authors state that Tullimonstrum was not a cephalopod (in the absence of other supporting traits), but argue that eye structure and chemistry alone cannot disprove invertebrate affinities.

Even if the eye of Tullimonstrum is homologous with vertebrates, it is not necessarily a member of Vertebrata. Many vertebrate-like traits are also observed in tunicates (the larvae of which have pigmented eyes and tail fins), lancelets, and acorn worms (both of which have gill openings and axial support structures), and the extinct vetulicolians.

==== Mikami et al. (2023) ====
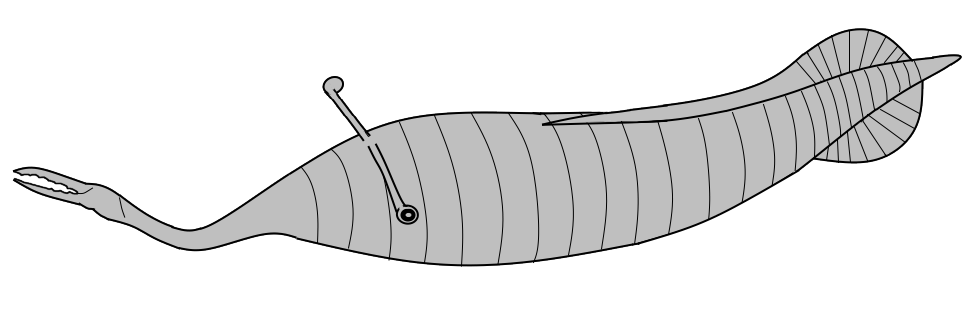
Reconstruction of Tullimonstrum as invertebrate according to Mikami et al. (2023)

Mikami et al. (2023) scanned 153 specimens of Tullimonstrum by 3‑D scanner, as well as other taxa from Mazon Creek. They concluded that some of the characters used by McCoy et al. (2016) to justify a vertebrate identity (tri-lobed brain, tectal cartilages, fin rays) are not comparable to those of vertebrates. The authors also determined that Tullimonstrum has segmentation extending to the preoptic region, which is clearly different from vertebrates. Alternative classifications were discussed in detail, but Tullimonstrum could be a non-vertebrate chordate (due to its segmentation resembling the myomeres of Esconichthys apopyris, an enigmatic jawed vertebrate from Mazon Creek), or from a protostome.

== Paleoecology ==
Tullimonstrum was probably a free-swimming carnivore that dwelt in open marine water, and was occasionally washed to the near-shore setting in which it was preserved. This means it swam freely in the water and not clamped to a hard surface or benthic environment.

=== Taphonomy ===
The formation of the Mazon Creek fossils is unusual. When the creatures died, they were rapidly buried in silty outwash. The bacteria that began to decompose the plant and animal remains in the mud produced carbon dioxide in the sediments around the remains. The carbonate combined with iron from the groundwater around the remains, forming encrusting nodules of siderite. The organism was entombed, retarding decay and allowing an impression or carbonaceous remains of the organism to be preserved. The first insights into the mechanisms of carbonaceous preservation in the Mazon Creek are provided as part of a large fossil data set; however, the details are still subject of ongoing research.

The combination of rapid burial and rapid formation of siderite resulted in excellent preservation of the many animals and plants that were entombed in the mud. As a result, the Mazon Creek fossils are one of the world's major Lagerstätten, or concentrated fossil assemblages. The rapid burial and compression often caused Tullimonstrum carcasses to fold and bend like other Mazon Creek animals.

The proboscis is rarely preserved in its entirety; it is complete in around 3% of specimens. However, some part of the organ is preserved in about 50% of cases.

Many unique fossils have been found alongside Tullimonstrum like the sea anemone Essexella, the malacostracan Belotelson, the eurypterid Adelophthalmus mazonensis, horseshoe crabs, the elasmobranch fish Bandringa, and the coleoid cephalopod Jeletzkya.

== The dancing worms of Turkana ==
A 1966–1968 prank promulgated by paleontologist Bryan Patterson suggested that modern representatives could possibly be found in remote lakes of Kenya, known under the local name "Ekurut Loedonkakini". These "dancing worms of Turkana" could supposedly kill a man with a bite, produced some sort of milk, and were known even to school-age children.

Patterson had several letters sent from Kenya under various aliases to Eugene Richardson, the Field Museum's curator of fossil invertebrates. Patterson had previously been the museum's curator of vertebrate paleontology and retained an accomplice there who was aware of the prank (and prevented it from going too far). A planned expedition was cancelled after the hoax was disclosed in a good-natured Christmas letter.

Richardson later recounted the story and published the original letters, poems, and doctored photos in a book under the pseudonym E. Scumas Rory.

== In culture ==
In 1989, Tullimonstrum gregarium was officially designated the state fossil of Illinois. Artwork of it is featured on U-Haul rental vehicles from the state.

== See also ==
- Paleontology in Illinois
