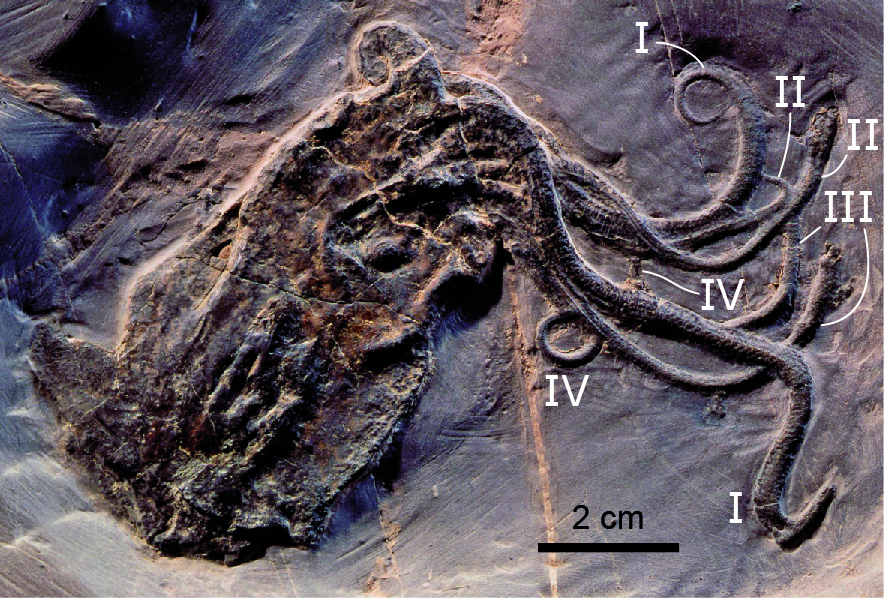
- Proteroctopus ribeti holotype.

Scientific classification
- Kingdom: Animalia
- Phylum: Mollusca
- Class: Cephalopoda
- Clade: Vampyropoda
- Genus: †Proteroctopus
- Species: †P. ribeti

Binomial name
- †Proteroctopus ribeti Fischer & Riou, 1982

= Proteroctopus =

Proteroctopus Temporal range: Lower Callovian

Genus of octopuses

Proteroctopus, from Ancient Greek πρότερος (próteros), meaning "anterior", ὀκτώ (októ), meaning "eight", and πούς (poús), meaning "foot", is an extinct genus of cephalopod that lived in the Middle Jurassic, approximately 164 million years ago. It is only known from a single species P. ribeti. The single fossil specimen assigned to this species originates from the Lower Callovian of Voulte-sur-Rhône in France. It is currently on display at the Musée de Paléontologie de La Voulte-sur-Rhône. While originally interpreted as an early octopus, a 2016 restudy of the specimen considered it to be a basal member of the Vampyropoda, less closely related to octopus or vampire squid than either of the two groups are to each other. A phylogenetic analysis by Kruta et al. indicates that Proteroctopus may be more closely related to the Vampyromorpha based on its unique morphology: two fins, head fused to the body, eight arms, two rows of oblique sucker, a gladius and absence of an ink sac. A 2022 phylogenetic analysis also found it to be more closely related to vampire squid than to octopuses. The morphology of P. ribeti suggests a necto-epipelagic mode of life.

== See also ==
- Jeletzkya douglassae
- Palaeoctopus newboldi
- Vampyronassa rhodanica
