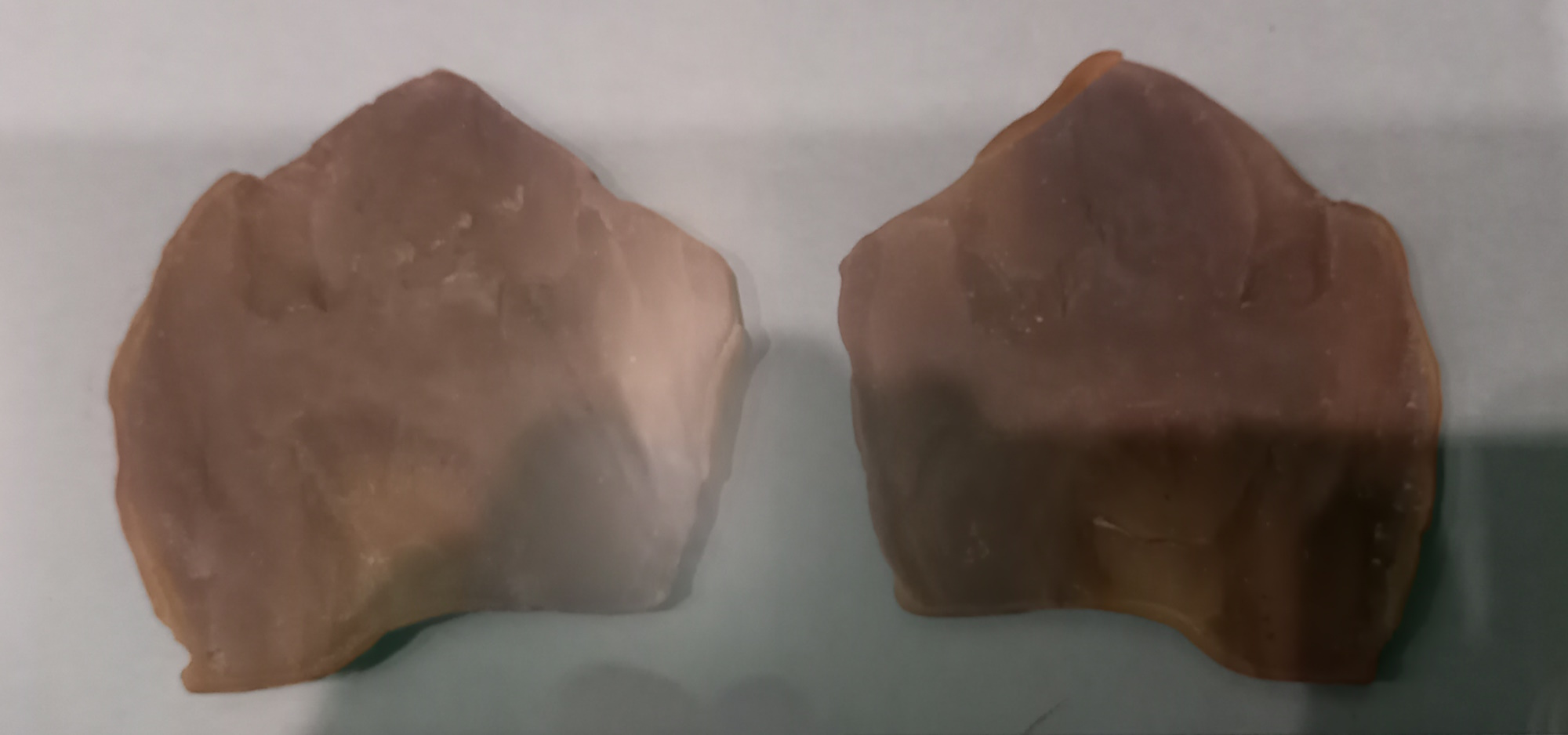
- Fossil specimens of Etacystis communis

Scientific classification
- Kingdom: Animalia
- Phylum: Hemichordata
- Class: Pterobranchia
- Subclass: Graptolithina
- Genus: †Etacystis; Nitecki & Schram, 1976
- Species: †E. communis

Binomial name
- †Etacystis communis Nitecki & Schram, 1976

= Etacystis =

Etacystis communis Temporal range: Middle Pennsylvanian

Carboniferous invertebrate of unclear classification

Etacystis communis, colloquially known as the H-animal or aitch, was a soft-bodied invertebrate that lived in shallow tropical coastal waters of muddy estuaries during the Pennsylvanian geological period, about 300 million years ago. The classification is uncertain: the animal was likely colored red and had a unique H-shaped body ranging from 2 to 11 cm long, and researchers have suggested a hemichordate or hydrozoan affinity. However, the animal did not possess a stomochord. Examples of Etacystis have been only found in the Mazon Creek fossil beds of the Midwestern United States.

== Etymology ==
Named in 1976, Etacystis communis takes its genus name from its shape, being roughly similar in shape to the letter "H". Eta is the Greek letter "H" while cystis, from the Greek kystis, means sac or bladder, referring to the organism's sac-like body plan. The specific name refers to the relatively common occurrence of the animal in the Mazon Creek fossil beds. Only a single species has been described.

== Description ==
Etacystis is an unusual animal of uncertain affinities, found among the Essex fauna of the Mazon Creek beds. It displays, as described above, a roughly H-shaped body plan. It has a stolon-like structure from which a peduncle arises at approximate right angles. The distal end of the peduncle has two arm-like extensions of unequal length, and a sac/worm-like structure is attached to the peduncle by a short stalk, in the direction of the shorter of the two arms.

Relatively large for the animals of its time, Etacystis fossils of up to 11 cm have been known, with incomplete specimens considered to have been up to 15 cm in life. The holotype is 5 cm across from tip of sac to tip of arm, and the smallest specimens have measured as little as 2 cm. The H-animal is most likely a colonial organism that continued to grow throughout its lifetime, explaining the wide variation in specimen sizes found. The exact shape of the main sac varies significantly from specimen to specimen, from lobe-shaped to heart-shaped and others.

== Affinity ==
There is insufficient evidence to align Etacystis to any phylum with certainty. However, it is considered by Nitecki and Schram that there are similarities with the Hemichordata which includes the acorn worms, and an affinity to this group is considered likely. The organism may have a close affinity to the Pterobranchia class, which likely includes the graptolite organisms, however it is not certain if it belongs within the class or is a sister clade. The modern pterobranchs usually only grow to about a centimetre, unlike the relatively large H-animals. An alternate opinion considers Etacystis to be a hydrozoan, provisionally in the Siphonophorae.

== See also ==
- Burgess Shale
- Paleontology in Illinois
- Escumasia – another enigmatic organism commonly nicknamed as the "y-animal"
