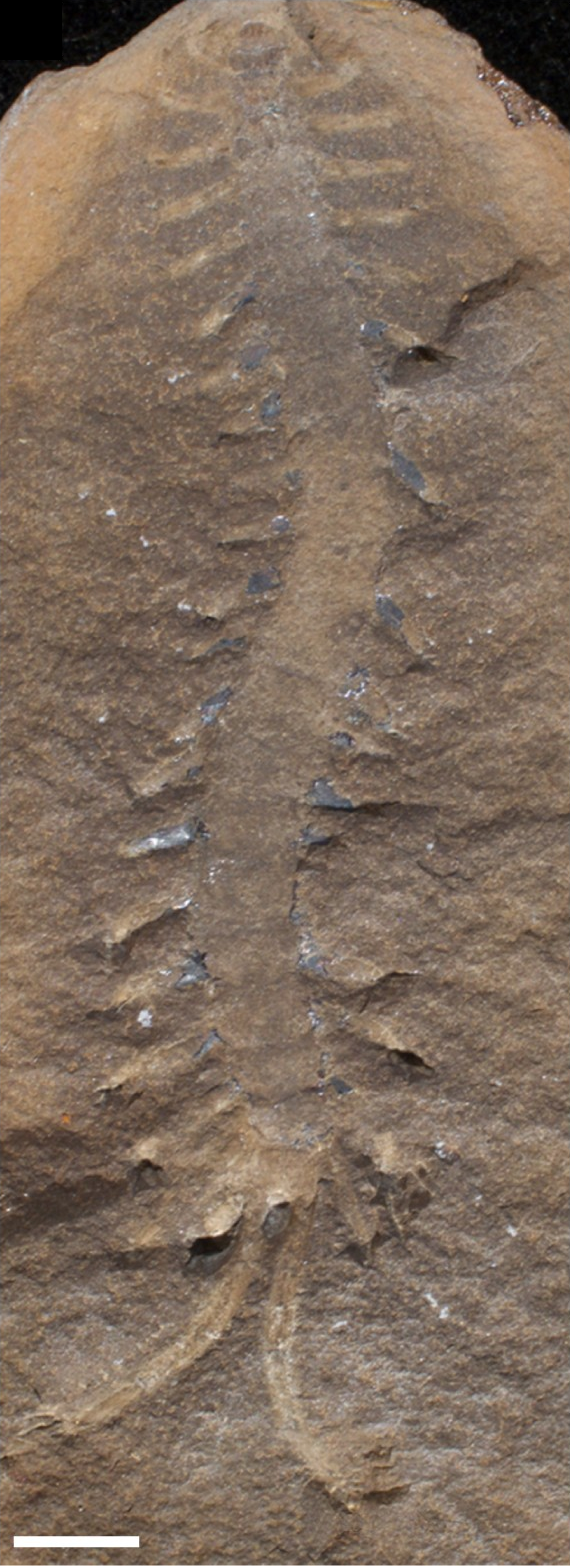
- Fossil specimen

Scientific classification
- Kingdom: Animalia
- Phylum: Arthropoda
- Subphylum: Myriapoda
- Class: Chilopoda
- Order: Scolopendromorpha
- Genus: †Mazoscolopendra; Mundel, 1979

Type species
- Mazoscolopendra richardsoni Mundel, 1979

= Mazoscolopendra =

Extinct genus of centipedes

Mazoscolopendra is an extinct genus of scolopendromorph centipedes, and the oldest known member of that order. It existed during the Carboniferous in what is now Illinois (found in Mazon Creek fossil beds).

With length up to 53 millimetres (2.1 in), this centipede had 21 pedal segments. Although family it belongs to is uncertain, in the original description it is suggested that is close to Cryptopidae than to Scolopendridae.
