= Hydrostatic skeleton =

Flexible skeleton supported by fluid pressure

A hydrostatic skeleton or hydroskeleton is a type of skeleton supported by hydrostatic fluid pressure or liquid, common among soft-bodied invertebrate animals colloquially referred to as "worms". While more advanced organisms can be considered hydrostatic, they are sometimes referred to as hydrostatic for their possession of a hydrostatic organ instead of a hydrostatic skeleton, where the two may have the same capabilities but are not the same. As the prefix hydro- meaning "water", being hydrostatic means being fluid-filled.

As a skeletal structure, a hydroskeleton possesses the ability to affect shape and movement, and involves two mechanical units: the muscle layers and the body wall. The muscular layers are longitudinal and circular, and part of the fluid-filled coelom within. Contractions of the circular muscles lengthen the organism's body, while contractions of the longitudinal muscles shorten the organism's body. Fluid within the organism is evenly concentrated so the forces of the muscle are spread throughout the whole organism and shape changes can persist. These structural factors also persist in a hydrostatic organ.

A non-helical hydrostatic skeleton structure is the functional basis of the mammalian penis, which fills the corpora cavernosa with blood to maintain physical rigidity during coitus. Helically reinforced hydrostatic skeleton structure is typical for flexible structures as in soft-bodied animals.

== Structure ==
Many animals with a wormlike cylindrical body have a hydrostatic skeleton with a flexible skin and a water-filled body cavity (coelom or pseudocoelom). They move by peristalsis, using opposed circular and longitudinal muscles, which act on the hydrostatic skeleton to change the body's shape.

Hydrostatic skeletons are typically arranged in a cylinder. Hydrostatic skeletons can be controlled by several different muscle types. Length can be adjusted by longitudinal muscle fibers parallel to the longitudinal axis. The muscle fibers may be found in continuous sheets or isolated bundles, and the diameter can be manipulated by three different muscle types: circular, radial, and transverse. Circular musculature wraps around the circumference of the cylinder, radial musculature extends from the center of the cylinder towards the surface, and transverse musculature arrange in parallel and perpendicular sheets crossing the diameter of the cylinder.

Within the cylinder lies fluid, most often water. The fluid is resistant to changes in volume. Contraction of circular, radial or transverse muscles increases the pressure within the cylinder, and results in an increase in length. Contraction of longitudinal muscles can shorten the cylinder.

Change in shape is limited by connective tissue fibers. Connective fibers, often collagenous, are arranged in a helical shape within the wall of the hydrostatic skeleton. The helical shape formed by these fibers allows for elongation and shortening of the skeleton, while still remaining rigid to prevent torsion. As the shape of the cylinder changes, the pitch of the helix will change. The angle relative to the long axis will decrease during elongation and increase during shortening.

== Advantages and disadvantages ==
Organisms containing a hydrostatic skeleton have advantages and disadvantages. Their fluid shape allows them to move around easily while swimming and burrowing. They can fit through oddly shaped passages and hide themselves more effectively from predators. They are able to create a force when squeezing through rocks and create a “prying open” gesture. There is a lightweight, flexible component to them that allows this movement with very little muscle mass.

These organisms are also able to heal faster than organisms that contain hard skeletons. Healing in these organisms varies from creature to creature. However, if the cavity needs to be refilled, the “fluid” can easily be refilled if it is water or blood. If the fluid is some other type of liquid, it can take longer, but it is still faster than healing a bone. The common earthworm is also able to regrow damaged parts of its body.

These organisms have some relatively simple pathways for circulation and respiration. Also, these organisms have a cushion to allow protection for internal organs from shock. However, it does not protect internal organs from external damage very effectively.

Because the hydrostatic skeletons have limited ability for attachment of limbs, the organisms are relatively simple and do not have many abilities to grab or latch onto things. Organisms with complete hydrostatic skeletons need to be in an environment that allows them to re-fill themselves with their fluid that is necessary for survival. This is why hydrostatic skeletons are common in marine life. They have a large amount of access to the necessary elements for survival. Terrestrial organisms that have hydrostatic skeletons generally have a lack of strength because they are not in a fluid environment. If one were to expand its body too much, it would collapse under its own weight.

== Organisms ==
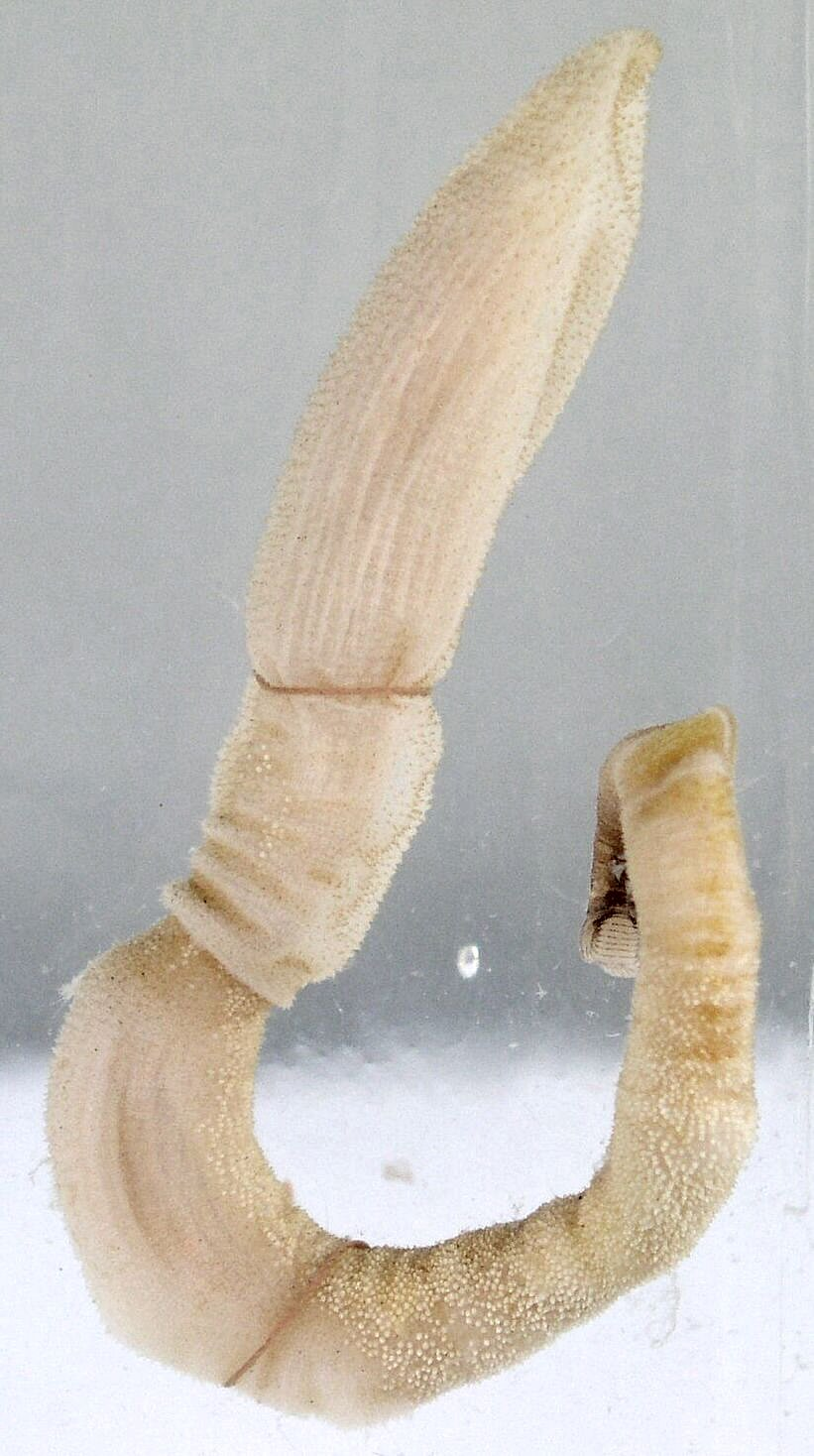
The hemichordates are among the many marine animals with hydrostatic skeletons and peristaltic locomotion.

Hydrostatic skeletons are very common in invertebrates. A common example is the earthworm. Also, hydrostatic nature is common in marine life such as jellyfish and sea anemones. Earthworms have rings of muscles that are filled with fluid, making their entire body hydrostatic. A sea anemone has a hydrostatic head, with arms radiating out around the mouth. This structure is helpful in feeding and locomotion.

An example of a simple deuterostome containing a hydrostatic skeleton would be Enteropneusta, commonly named acorn worms. This organism is classified as a hemichordate, and they are marine worms that use their hydrostatic skeleton to tunnel and anchor themselves into the ground. This can be used for locomotion, but also can aid in the defense of the organism against outside forces as the worm can try to "hide" itself within the ocean floor.

=== Vertebrates ===
The mammalian penis is a hydrostatic organ. The hydrostatic fluid, in this case blood, fills the penis during an erection. Unlike the hydrostatic skeletons of many invertebrates, which use the bending of the animal for locomotion, the penis must resist bending and shape changes during sexual intercourse. Instead of connective fibers arranged in a helical shape, the penis contains a layer called the corpus cavernosum. The corpus cavernosum contains connective fibers arranged both parallel and perpendicular to the longitudinal axis. These fibers remain folded when the penis is flaccid, but unfold as the penis fills with blood during an erection, which allows the penis to resist bending. The penises of turtles are structured similarly, although they evolved separately.

Caecilians possess a hydrostatic skeleton used for both maintaining body posture and for generating extra force during burrowing. Other vertebrates sometimes utilize a version of the hydrostatic skeleton called a muscular hydrostat. Muscular hydrostats do not contain a fluid-filled cavity. These structures are constructed of muscle and connective fibers, densely packed into a 3-D structure. In many cases, the muscular hydrostat can be manipulated in all three dimensions. This allows for more precise movement compared to a typical hydrostatic skeleton. While in typical hydrostatic skeletons, movement is generated by applying force to a fluid-filled cavity, muscular hydrostats generate movement by muscle contractions. When one muscle contracts and decreases in area, other muscles within the structure must expand in response. Helical muscles may be present, which can create torsion, an ability that is restricted in hydrostatic skeletons. Muscular hydrostats are found in mammalian, reptilian, and amphibian tongues. Mammalian tongues have the structure of a central core of muscle fibers surrounded by bundles of longitudinal muscles and alternating parallel sheets of transverse muscle fibers. Elephant trunks and tapir proboscises also utilize a muscular hydrostat. These structures are composed of longitudinal fibers surrounded by radial and helical fibers.

== See also ==
- Endoskeleton
- Exoskeleton
- Pneumatic artificial muscles
