= Endoskeleton =

Internal support structure of an animal

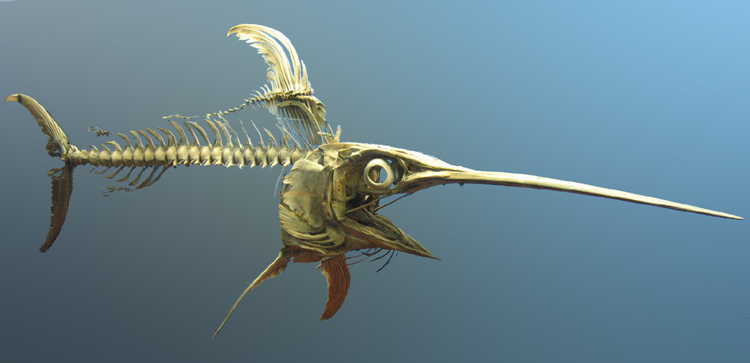
Endoskeleton of a swordfish

An endoskeleton (from Ancient Greek ἔνδον (éndon), meaning "inside", and σκελετός (skeletós), meaning "skeleton") is a structural frame (skeleton) — usually composed of mineralized tissue — on the inside of an animal, overlaid by soft tissues. Endoskeletons serve as structural support against gravity and mechanical loads, and provide anchoring attachment sites for skeletal muscles to transmit force and allow movements and locomotion.

Vertebrates and the closely related cephalochordates are the predominant animal clade with endoskeletons (made of mostly bone and sometimes cartilage, as well as notochordal glycoprotein and collagen fibers), although invertebrates such as sponges also have evolved a form of "rebar" endoskeletons made of diffuse meshworks of calcite/silica structural elements called spicules, and echinoderms have a dermal calcite endoskeleton known as ossicles. Some coleoid cephalopods (squids and cuttlefish) have an internalized vestigial aragonite/calcite-chitin shell known as gladius or cuttlebone; these can serve as muscle attachments, but their main function is often to maintain buoyancy rather than to give structural support, and their body shape is largely maintained by their hydroskeleton.

Compared to the exoskeletons of many invertebrates, endoskeletons allow much larger overall body sizes for the same skeletal mass, as most soft tissues and organs are positioned outside the skeleton rather than within it, thus unrestricted by the volume and internal capacity of the skeleton itself. Being more centralized in structure also means more compact volume, making it easier for the circulatory system to perfuse and oxygenate, as well as higher tissue density against stress. The external nature of muscle attachments also allows thicker and more diverse muscle architectures, as well as more versatile range of motions.

== Overview ==
A true endoskeleton is derived from mesodermal tissue. In three phyla of animals, Chordata (chordates), Echinodermata (echinoderms) and Porifera (sponges), endoskeletons of various complexity are found. An endoskeleton may function purely for structural support (as in the case of Porifera), but often also serves as an attachment site for muscles and a mechanism for transmitting muscular forces as in chordates and echinoderms, which provides a means of locomotion.

Compared to the exoskeleton structure in many invertebrates (particularly panarthropods), the endoskeleton has several advantages:

- The capacity for larger body sizes under the same skeletal mass, as the endoskeleton has a "flesh-over-bone" construct rather than a "flesh-in-bone" one as in exoskeletons. This means that the body's overall volume is not restricted by the endoskeleton itself, but by the weight of soft tissues that can be attached and supported by it, while the capacity of an exoskeleton's internal cavity restricts how much organs and tissues can be supported. Because of skeletal rigidity, many invertebrates have to repeatedly moult (ecdysis) during the juvenile stages of life to grow bigger.
- Endoskeletons have a more concentrated layout due to its internalized nature, so a greater proportion of skeletal tissue can be recruited to handle mechanical loads. In contrast, exoskeletons are more "spread thin" over the exterior, meaning that when stress is applied to one area of the body, most of the remaining exoskeleton often just plays "dead weight". Increasing the skeletal strength of a local area often means having to increase the cuticle thickness and density of an entire part of the body, which increase the overall weight significantly, especially with larger body sizes.
- Being internal means the skeletal tissue can be perfused and maintained from both inside (via nutrient arteries of the marrow) and outside (via periosteal arterioles). The tissue catchment volume that the circulatory system is required to cover is also smaller than that of exoskeletons, making it easier to maintain skeletal health.
- Endoskeletons are typically cushioned from trauma by the overlying soft tissues, while exoskeletons are directly exposed to external insults.
- Having other tissues attached outside the skeleton means that endoskeletons can have a more diverse muscular layouts as well as bigger physiological cross-sectional area, which translates to greater contractile strength and adaptability. Having external muscles also means the potential for greater leverage as the muscle can attach further down from a joint (comparatively, exoskeletal muscles cannot attach farther than the internal diameter of the corresponding joint cavity), although the muscles (especially flexors) themselves can sometimes physically hinder the joint's range of motion.

=== Chordates ===
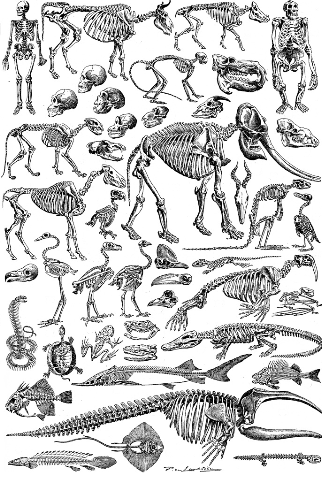
Clicking on a skeleton in the picture causes the browser to load the appropriate article

All chordates have a notochord, a flexible glycoprotein rod cross-wrapped by two collagen-elastin helices, which their body plans develop around as embryos. With the exception of the subphylum Tunicata (whose members only retain the notochord during larval stages and as adults are either soft-bodied or, in the case of sea squirts, supported by a cellulose exoskeleton known as a test), chordate bodies are developed along an axial endoskeleton derived from the notochord. Like many macroscopically motile bilaterian animals that need to be capable of sufficient locomotive propulsion, chordates evolved specialized striated muscles over their endoskeletons, which have serialized sarcomeres and parallel myofibrils bundled in fascicles to both generate greater force and optimize contractile speed.

==== Cephalochordates ====
In the more basal subphylum Cephalochordata (lancelets), the endoskeleton solely consists of a single notochord. Alternating muscle contractions bend the notochord from side to side, which stores and releases elastic energy like a spring, resulting in a body-caudal fin locomotion with better energy efficiency, although extant cephalochordates (only three genera with 32 species from the family Branchiostomatidae) are burrowing filter feeders who mostly remain immobile in the substrate.

==== Vertebrates ====
Chordates in the crown group subphylum Vertebrata (i.e. vertebrates, such as fish, amphibians, reptiles, birds and mammals), the endoskeleton is greatly expanded. During embryonic development, the notochord becomes segmentally replaced by a much tougher vertebral column (i.e. the spine) composed of stiffer structural elements called vertebrae. Notochord remnants are transformed into intervertebral discs, which give some range of motion between the adjacent vertebrae, allowing the overall spinal column to flex and rotate. The vertebrate endoskeleton is made up of two types of mineralized tissues, i.e. bone and cartilage, with the joints reinforced by ligaments made of Type I collagen. Unlike the singular axial skeleton of cephalochordates, the vertebrate skeletal elements expand axially, ventrally and laterally to form the cranium, rib cage and appendicular skeleton, giving vertebrates a much more widened endoskeleton.

Vertebrates also have bulkier, more complexly organized striated muscles called skeletal muscles inserted over both the axial and appendicular skeletons, which can transmit significant forces via dense connective tissue cords/bands called tendons and aponeuroses. In terrestrial vertebrates (tetrapods), both the axial and especially the appendicular endoskeleton (the latter of which evolved into limb skeletons) have become significantly strengthened to adapt for the added burden of gravity and locomotion on dry land, as their bodies' weight is not offset by buoyancy as in aquatic environments. In some vertebrate species, parts of the endoskeleton become specialized for flight (as wings), balance (in arboreal species), communication (as vocalizations or fin/sail/crest display), hearing (mammalian ossicles), digestion (particularly mastication) and prehensility (grasping, object manipulation and fine motor activities).

The combination of a more robust endoskeleton and a stronger, more versatile muscular system, supported by a heart-pumped closed circulatory system, a myelinated nervous system with faster saltatory conductions (in all jawed vertebrates) and centralized neural control by a highly functional brain, have allowed the vertebrates to achieve much larger body sizes than invertebrates while still maintaining responsive sensory perception and motor control. As a result, vertebrates have gradually dominated all high-level niches in both aquatic and terrestrial ecosystems since the Devonian (circa. 420-359 Mya).

=== Echinoderms ===
Echinoderms have a mesodermal skeleton in the dermis, composed of calcite-based plates known as ossicles, which form a porous structure known as stereom. In sea urchins, the ossicles are fused together into a test, while in the arms of sea stars, brittle stars and crinoids (sea lilies) they articulate to form flexible joints. The ossicles may bear external projections in the form of spines, granules or warts that are supported by a tough epidermis. Echinoderm skeletal elements are sometimes deployed in specialized ways such as the chewing organ in sea urchins called "Aristotle's lantern", the supportive stalks of crinoids, and the structural "lime ring" of sea cucumbers.

=== Sponges ===
The poriferan "skeleton" consists of mesh-like network of microscopic spicules. The soft connective tissues of sponges are composed of gelatinous mesohyl reinforced by fibrous spongin, forming a composite matrix that has decent tensile strength but severely lacks the rigidity needed to resist deformation from ocean currents. The spicules act as structural elements that add much needed compressive and shear strengths that help maintain the sponge's shape (which is needed to ensure optimal filter feeding), much like the aggregates and rebar stirrups within reinforced concrete. Sponges can have spicules made of calcium carbonate (calcite or aragonite) or more commonly silica, which separate sponges into two main clades, calcareous sponges (class Calcarea) and siliceous sponges, the latter being the dominant extant clade with two classes Demospongiae (common sponges) and Hexactinellida (glass sponges). There are however species (such as bath sponge and lake sponge) that have no or severely reduced spicules, which gives them an overall soft "spongy" structure.

Deep-sea demosponges from the family Cladorhizidae have evolved a unique carnivorous survival strategy, by having tiny grappling hook-like spicules (microscleres) that extends outwards like burs to snag and trap passing-by aquatic animals such as small fish and crustaceans. As sponges don't have dedicated digestive systems, these predatory sponges rely on symbiotic organisms such as scale worms and microbes to help digest the seized prey and release nutrients that can then be absorbed by the sponges' cells.

=== Coleoids ===
The Coleoidea, a subclass of cephalopod molluscs who evolved an internalized shell, do not have a true endoskeleton in the physiological sense. The internal shell has evolved into a buoyancy organ called the gladius or cuttlebone, which may provide muscle attachment but does not support the cephalopod's body shape (which is maintained solely by a hydroskeleton). Coleoids from the order Octopoda (octopuses) even have lost that internalized shell completely.

== Gallery ==
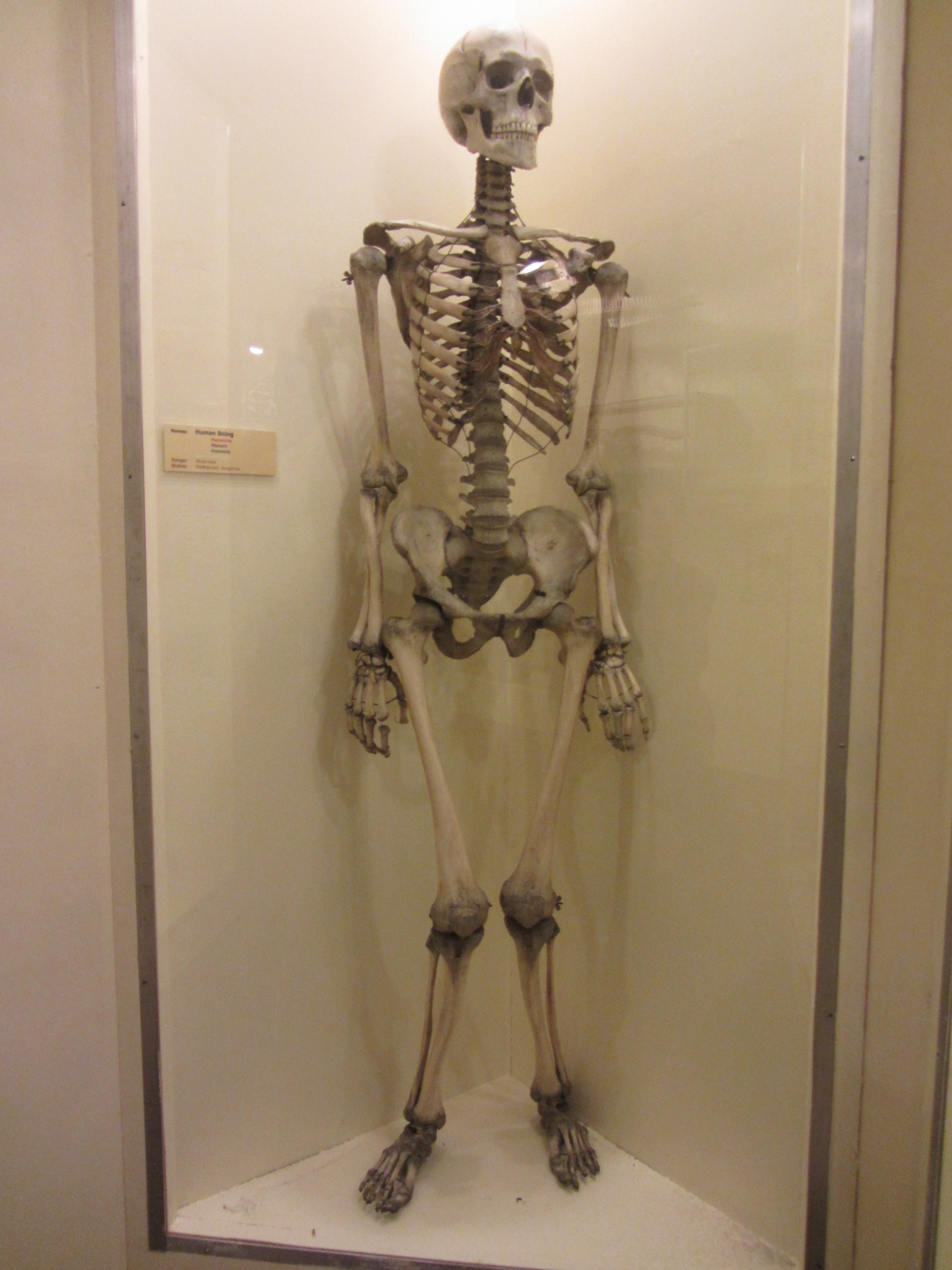
A human skeleton on display at Booth Museum of Natural History

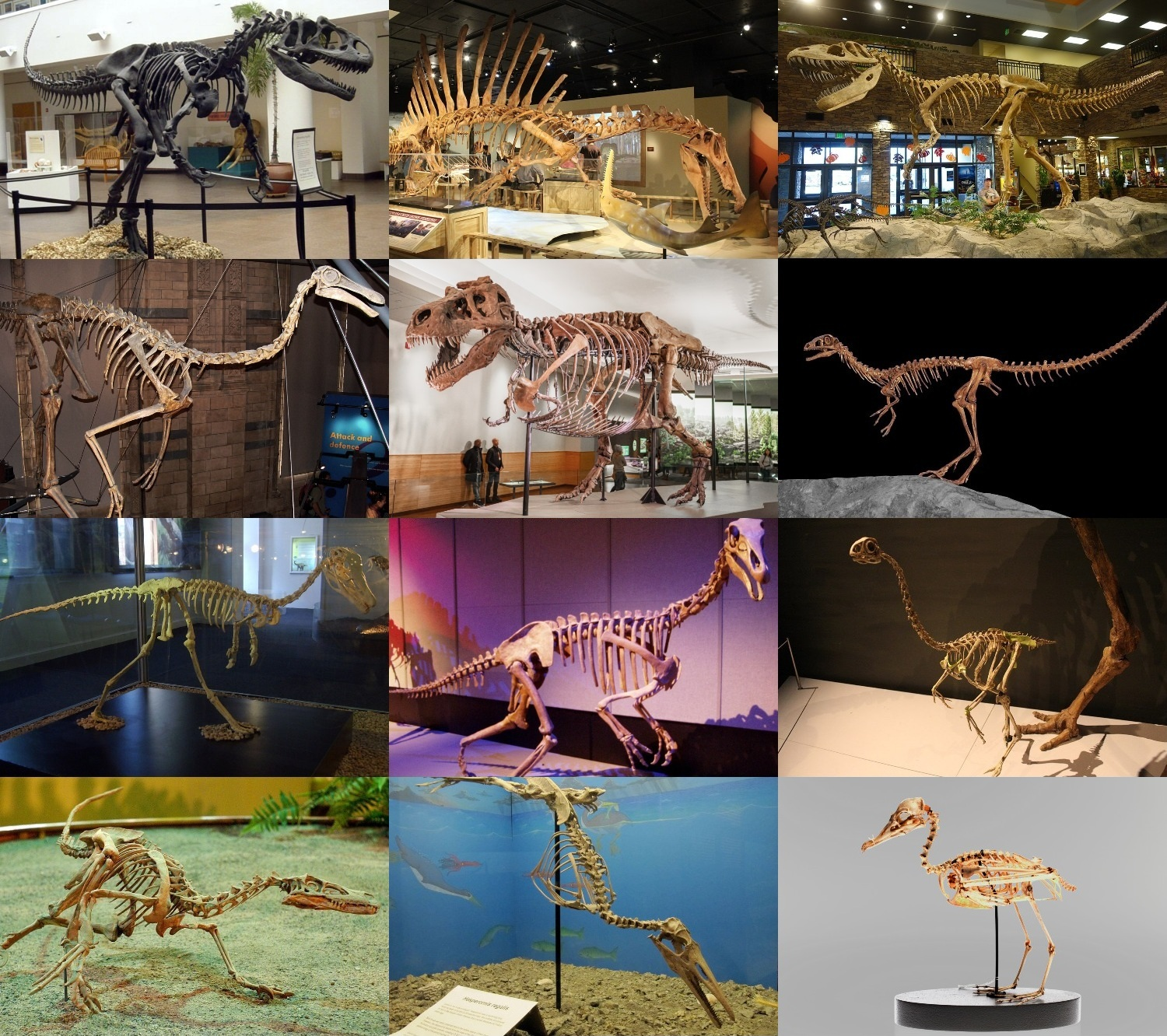
Fossilized skeleton of various dinosaurs

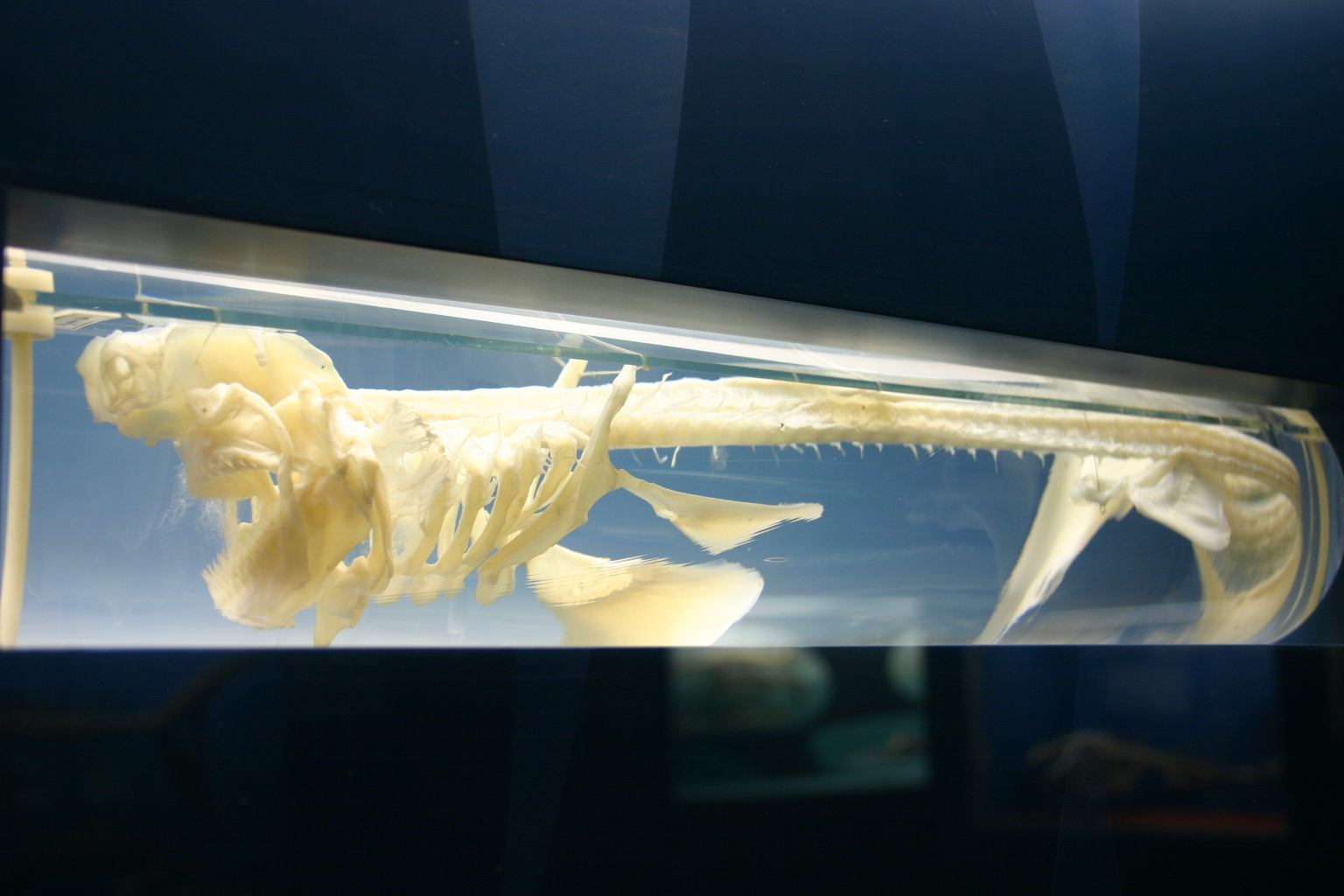
The skeleton of a kitefin shark, a cartilaginous fish

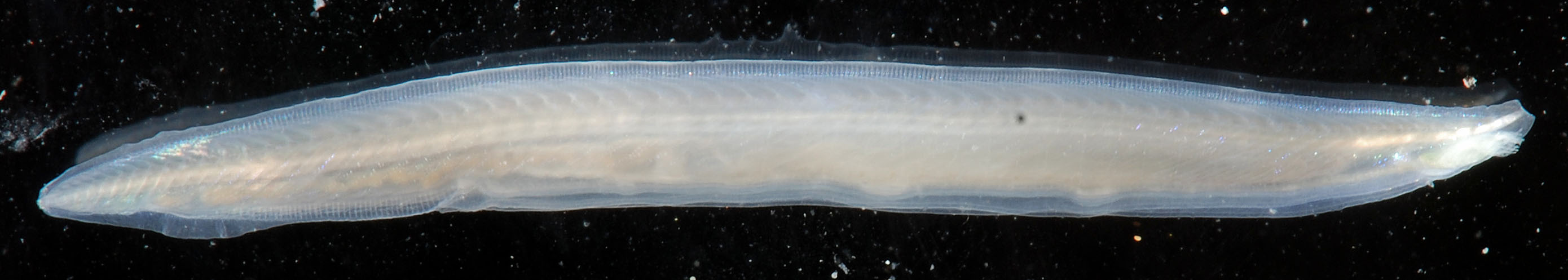
The notochord endoskeleton of Branchiostoma, a cephalochordate (lancelets)

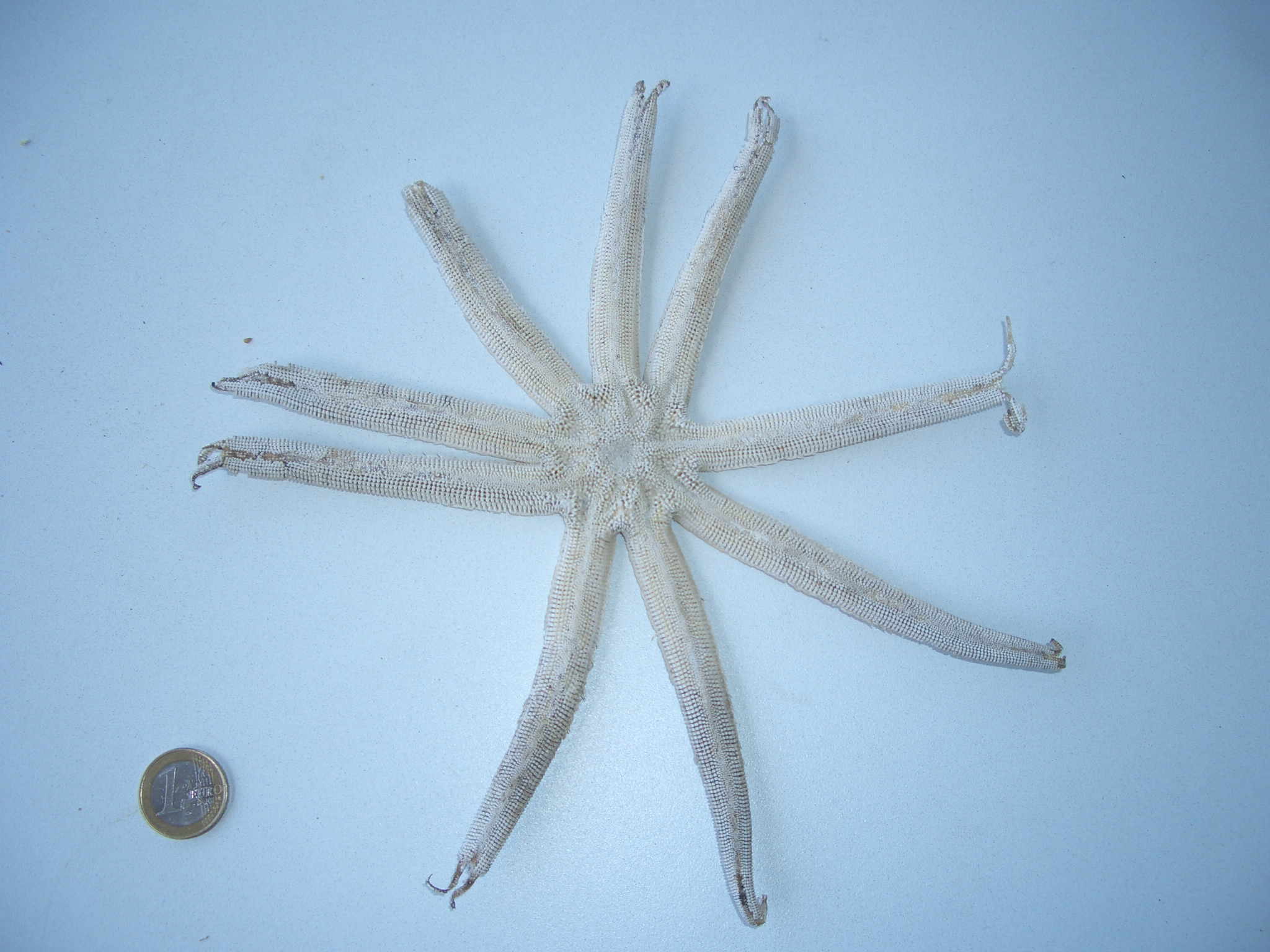
The dermal ossicles of a starfish, an echinoderm

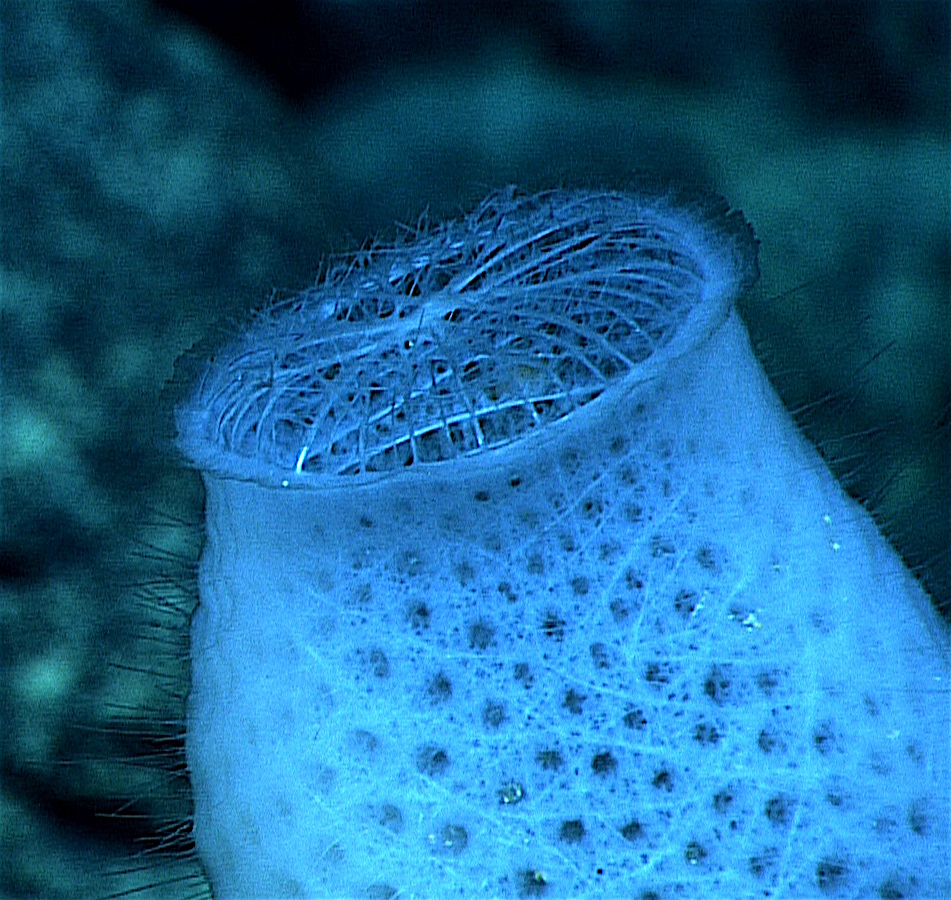
The silica spicule skeleton of a Venus' flower basket, a glass sponge

== See also ==
- Exoskeleton
- Hydrostatic skeleton
