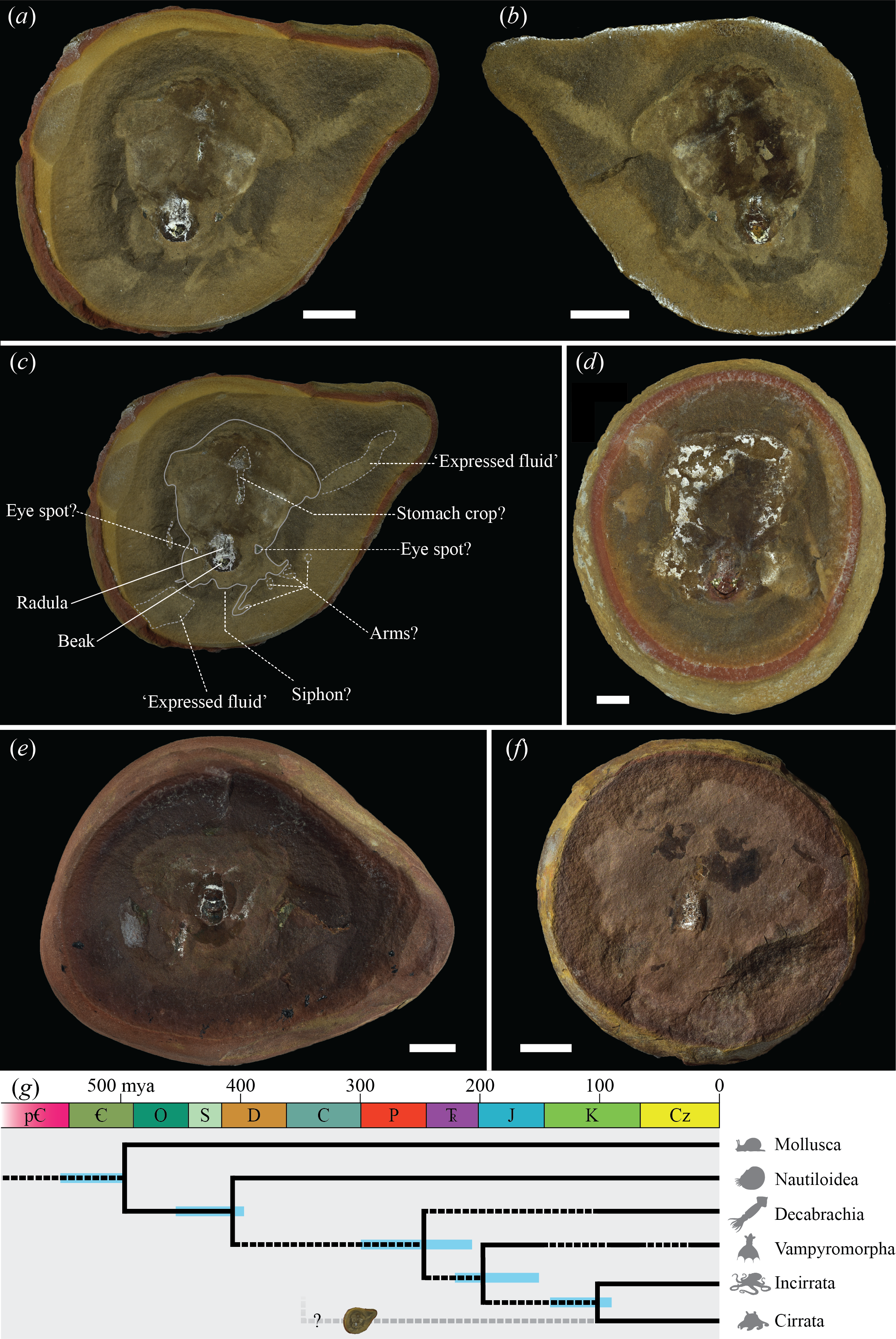

Scientific classification
- Kingdom: Animalia
- Phylum: Mollusca
- Class: Cephalopoda
- Subclass: Nautiloidea
- Genus: †Paleocadmus; Solen & Richardson, 1975

Type species
- †Paleocadmus herdinae Solen & Richardson, 1975

Other species
- †P. pohli (Saunders & Richardson, 1979)

Synonyms
- Pohlsepia mazonensis Kluessendorf & Doyle, 2000

= Paleocadmus =

Paleocadmus Temporal range: Pennsylvanian

Extinct genus of nautiloids

Paleocadmus is a genus of nautiloid from the Mazon Creek biota of uncertain affinity (incertae sedis). Previously, it was only known by isolated radula fossils, only around a centimetre in length and a few millimetres wide. A 2026 paper found that the holotype of Pohlsepia mazonensis, an alleged early octopus, to be very similar to Paleocadmus, and considers it a specimen of the second species.

== History ==
Paleocadmus herdinae was first described by Solem and Richardson in 1975 from the Mazon Creek fauna based upon an isolated but remarkably well preserved radular mold. Two further specimens have been found since, one of which, PE25583, has been described as distinct species by Saunders and Richardson in 1979, Paleocadmus pohli.

=== PE51727: "Pohlsepia mazonensis" ===
In 2000 Kluessendorf and Doyle described a new genus and species of what they assumed to be the oldest known octopodiforme, Pohlsepia mazonensis. The 3.5 cm (1.4 in) wide fossil is "sack-shaped" with indistinct features, including a poorly defined "head". The taxon is named after the fossil collector James Pohl, who found the specimen and donated it to the Field Museum of Natural History. The specimen has since been catalogued under the specimen number PE51727.

The authors of the description argued for a cirroctopodan affinity of the animal based on the fact that the fossil has an indistinct head, sac-like body and similar fins to cirrate octopods. The absence of an internal shell or gladius, which is known from much younger Mesozoic octopodiforme fossils such as the Muensterelloidea, Teudopsidae, Trachyteuthididae, or other members of the Vampyropoda, was seen as evidence of a closer relationship to derived modern octopuses.

However, this interpretation of the fossil has been considered doubtful, as Pohlsepia would vastly predate all other fossil octopods and all other ancestral octobrachians except for Syllipsimopodi. This would contradict the molecular divergence time estimates for the cirrate–incirrate divergence in the Jurassic.

Moreover, the lack of a gladius, gladius vestige, phragmocone or primordial rostrum is an extremely unlikely trait for a Carboniferous cephalopod. Arm hooks, suckers, cirri, webbing between the arms, and the characteristic 8-10 arm count of coleoid cephalopods cannot be recognized in the fossil. Additionally, the supposed fins may be interpreted as taphonomically deformed folds of tissue, and the beak or radula wasn't able to be confidently identified. These uncertainties lead Walen and Landman 2022 to suggest that Pohlsepia may not even be a cephalopod whatsoever, as the bulbous body outline and the presence of appendages are not exclusive to them. They considered it more likely that Pohlsepia may instead represent some kind of cnidarian; until the fossil is properly redescribed, it should be left out of any studies conducted on cephalopod evolution and interrelationship.

In 2026 a comprehensive reassessment of the Pohlsepia holotype alongside multiple new specimens, using a suite of more advanced analytical techniques, was published in the Proceedings of the Royal Society B. Using synchrotron micro-X-ray fluorescence elemental mapping, the radula of Pohlsepia was revealed within the rocky matrix. The radula is exclusive to molluscs and firmly identifies Pohlsepia as one; the radular tooth count and morphology indicate that Pohlsepia is not an early octobrachian or even a coleoid at all, but instead is a nautiloid in an advanced stage of decomposition, meaning it is the oldest unequivocal fossil of nautiloid soft tissue. Additionally, the 2026 research team concluded that the morphology seen in the radula of Pohlsepia matches that of the already known Mazon Creek fauna nautiloid Paleocadmus pohli, and should be considered its junior synonym. They concluded that, as PE51727 was proven to not be a cirrate octopus, it no longer conflicts with the body of evidence pointing towards a Late Jurassic divergence date for modern octopus; a Paleozoic origin for major crown coleoid lineages is thus highly unlikely.

== Anatomy ==
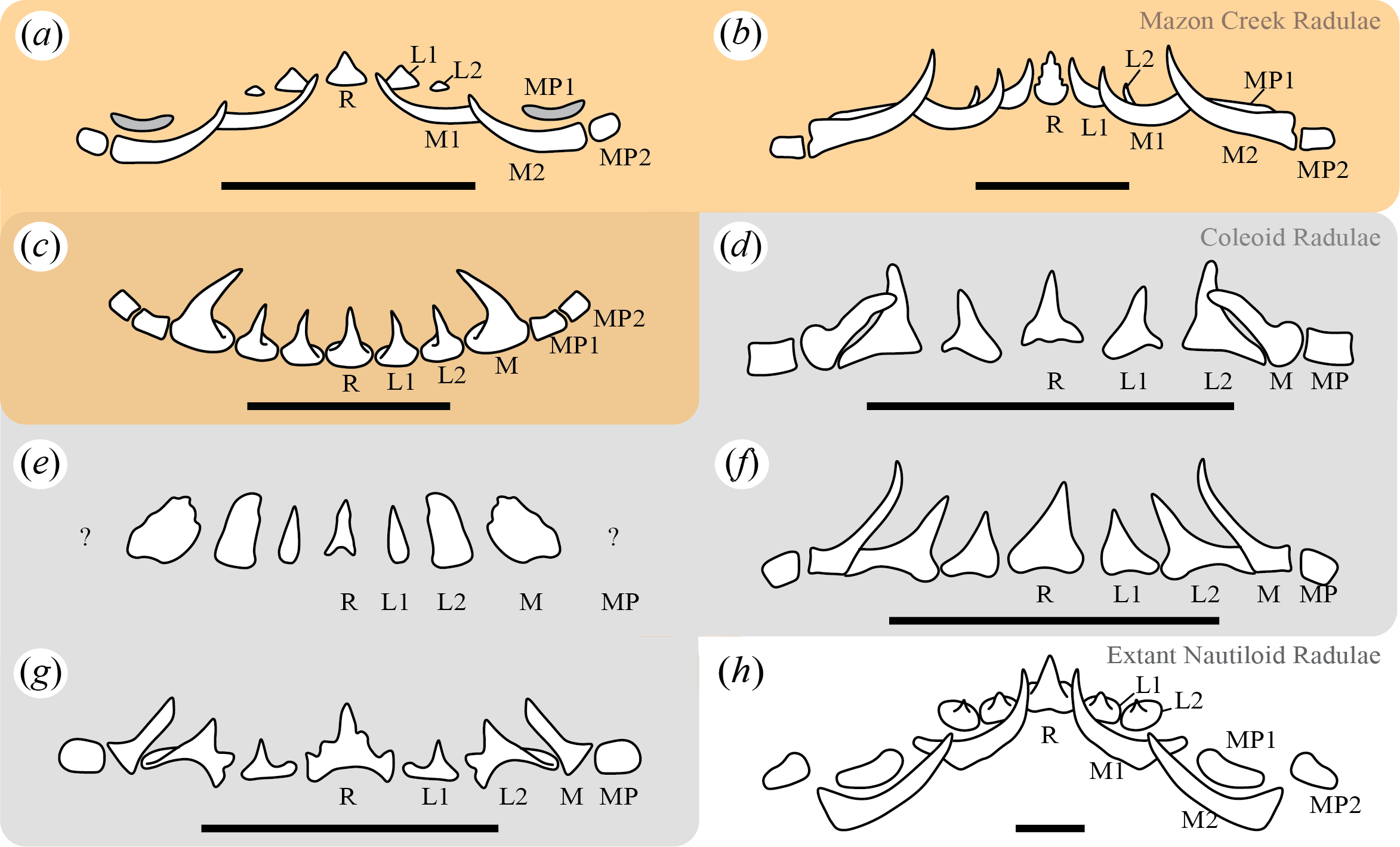
Radulae of extinct and extant cephalopods. (a) Composite reconstruction of Paleocadmus pohli‘s radula row (b) Paleocadmus herdinae

Knowledge about the anatomy of Paleocadmus is restricted to the radula, beak and parts of the soft tissue anatomy; the shell in the species is so far unknown.

The radula consists of a total of 18 rows of radular elements, with 13 elements per row, including a central rachidian tooth, four lateral teeth, four marginal teeth and four marginal plates. In comparison, both coleoids and ammonoids have fewer elements. The central rachidian tooth is relatively short and broadly triangular, and the first and second lateral teeth are similar. The marginal teeth are larger than the lateral teeth and are curved with a unicuspid morphology, a U-shaped cross-section and a smooth outer surface. A crescentic inner marginal plate lies above the second marginal tooth; there appears to be an outer marginal plate, but its exact shape is hard to recognise.

The beak appears to be preserved in PE51727, with both upper and lower beaks in an anterior/posterior orientation; they are incomplete and both the rostrum tips and the wings are broken.

PE51727 preserves a large part of the original soft tissue of Paleocadmus, albeit in a poor state; what was originally identified as the remnants of the siphon in the description of Pohlsepia could not be verified as such. Kluessendorf and Doyle claimed to have identified 8 distinct arms in the fossil, but while the elemental maps and multispectral images do show some poorly preserved appendage-like structures, they cannot be clearly identified as 8 arms or specialised tentacles. None of the other specimens assigned to Paleocadmus show this either. The supposed cirrate octopus-like fins have been shown to be part of the animal's body outline; no other evidence of fins could be found anywhere on the fossil.

A three-dimensional pyrite-filled structure is preserved at the centre of the fossil, which has been variously interpreted as an ink sac, stomach or crop by Kluessendorf and Doyle, but the absence of melanosomes and any clear anatomical structures casts doubt on that interpretation. The structure has not been identified in any other specimen either. Melanosomes have also not been found in the paired ‘eyespots’ consisting of three-dimensional shallow bowl-like impressions infilled with a darker stained matrix, but they are located in the expected position of the eyes and have thus been interpreted as representing pinhole-like eyes, as is seen in extant Nautilus.

== Taphonomy ==
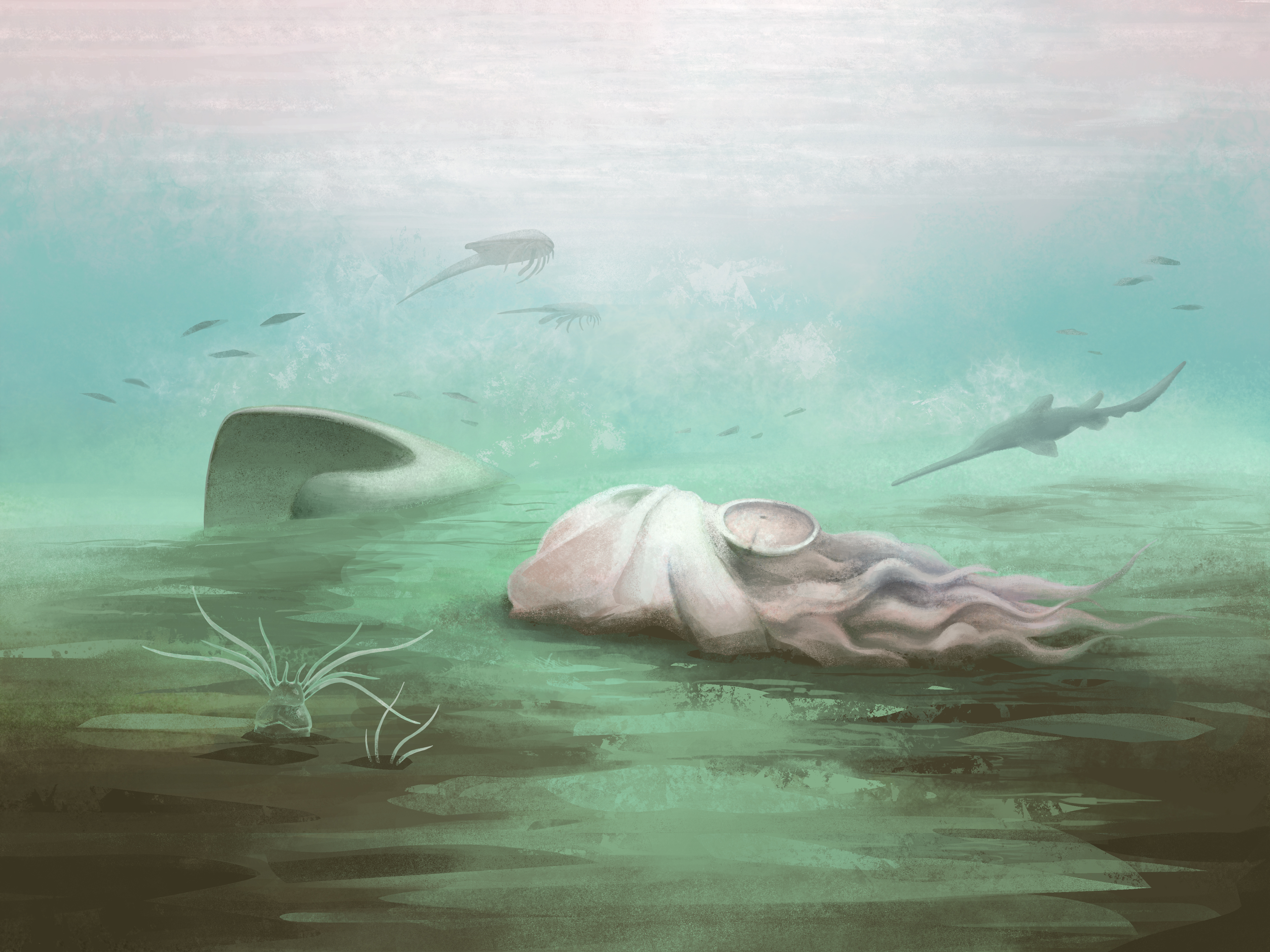
Reconstruction of a Paleocadmus decaying prior to burial in the Mazon Creek marine basin. The separated shell is visible in the background.

The quality of preservation seen in fossils hailing from Mazon Creek varies significantly even among specimens of the same taxon; this variation has been interpreted as being a consequence of the ancient Mazon marine basin's depositional environment. It is likely that recently deceased organisms were buried at varying rates, primarily controlled by the distance to the ancient coastline, which would have affected the sedimentary input. Other factors influencing the quality of the preservation would have been the freshwater input, bioturbation and the amount of iron in the sediment, which all would have an impact on the rate of entombment by the siderite which acts as a geological stabiliser for the carcass. Soft tissues are commonly preserved in Mazon Creek, but the poor preservation of key anatomical soft tissue characters such as the arm crown or eyespots in PE51727 suggests that the carcass may have undergone a significant amount of decay before becoming fossilised. Exactly how long is difficult to ascertain, but based on observations conducted on decaying carcasses of extant Nautilus and coleoids, and assuming that no scavengers caused the carcass to disarticulate, it could have taken between a few days up to a couple of weeks for the carcass to be buried.

All specimens of Paleocadmus are preserved without shell itself or its imprint. Usually, the absence of soft tissues in nautiloid fossils or those of other shell-bearing cephalopods such as ammonoids is interpreted as being the result of floating after death. This means that the gas-filled chambered shell would float during decay, leaving the soft tissue to disarticulate. Once the shell has sunk to the bottom, all the soft tissue would've already disarticulated. However, this has been deemed unlikely for the specimens of Paleocadmus since the body outlines are relatively consistent. Investigation of modern Nautilus carcasses, however, has shown that under the right conditions, shells associated with the body can sink as long as the decay of the mantle and musculature allows the shell to become waterlogged. A waterlogged shell would explain the presence of the fossilised in situ jaws and stomach contents. The absence of the shell in Paleocadmus, however, suggests that it is possible that the entire soft tissue anatomy of shelled cephalopods could detach from the shell during decay; it is merely an open question whether or not this happened in the water column or on the seafloor. It is considered unlikely that the shell and soft tissue of PE51727 were buried together.

The preservation of soft tissue in nautiloids is highly unusual: fossil cephalopods are usually preserved via the replacement of soft tissue with authigenic minerals such as apatite. This process, however, requires specific conditions to lead to the mineralisation of the fossil. Experimental studies on decaying carcasses have shown that they are usually capable of generating the necessary geochemical gradients to trigger the process of mineralisation, but this process is difficult for cephalopods, many of which use an ammonium-based buoyancy system. The ammonium reduces the intensity of the geochemical gradients induced by decay, hampering preservation: the almost complete absence of nautiloid and ammonoid soft tissue in the fossil record has been linked to their potentially high levels of ammonia in their bodily tissues. The Mazon Creek Lagerstätte, however, does not preserve soft tissue through their replacement by authigenic minerals, but instead by the entombment of the carcass by iron carbonate (siderite), which may potentially mitigate ammonia-related pH buffering caused by the decay of nautiloids. This indicates that the Mazon Creek Lagerstätte is unusually suited to preserving the soft tissue of cephalopods.
