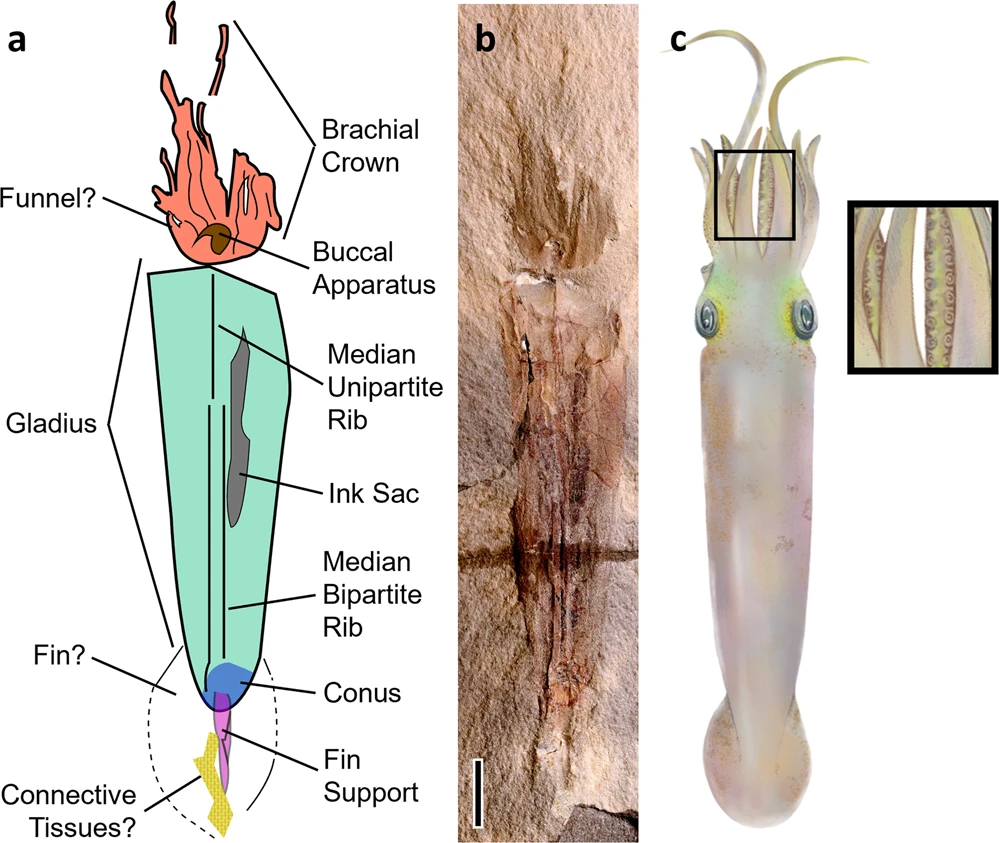

Scientific classification
- Kingdom: Animalia
- Phylum: Mollusca
- Class: Cephalopoda
- Clade: Vampyropoda
- Genus: †Syllipsimopodi; Whalen & Landman, 2022
- Species: †S. bideni

Binomial name
- †Syllipsimopodi bideni Whalen & Landman, 2022

= Syllipsimopodi =

Syllipsimopodi Temporal range: Mississippian 330.3–323.4 Ma

Genus of fossil coleoid

Syllipsimopodi is an extinct member of the cephalopod subclass Coleoidea originally interpreted to belong to the clade Vampyropoda, which includes octopuses (Octopoda) and vampire squids (Vampyromorphida). The type and only known species is Syllipsimopodi bideni, named in honor of US President Joe Biden, and to raise awareness of his climate change policies. The holotype fossil was found in the Bear Gulch Limestone deposit in the US state of Montana in 1988, and donated that year to the Royal Ontario Museum by B. Hawes, designated ROMIP 64897. The species lived during the (Carboniferous) Mississippian subperiod, 330.3 to 323.4 million years ago, pushing back the group of cephalopods by 81.9 million years.

== Taxonomy ==
A subsequent study doubted the assignment of Syllipsimopodi to Vampyropoda and suggested it to be a junior synonym of Gordoniconus beargulchensis. The original authors still consider it to be a separate genus and species but suggested further analyses might be needed to firmly place it in Vampyropoda.

== Description ==
Individuals were 12 cm (4.7 in) long and had 10 arms with suckers, with two of the arms being longer than the others. It is currently considered the oldest known vampyropod by some but certainly the oldest known cephalopod with biserial suckers on its ten robust appendages. The lead author of S. bideni states that it is possibly the only known vampyropod - if it really can considered one - that has 10 functional appendages, with all other species having eight arms, suggesting that their ancestors had ten arms. The arms measure to about ~2.1 to 2.4 mm wide at the midlength. Two of the arms measure in at ~4.0 to 4.1 cm long, making up 27% of the total body length. The elongated arms do not have obvious manus and are thinner than the other arms. The suckers are based along the midlength and are ~0.62 mm in diameter and are separated by ~0.5 mm. There is no evidence that the suckers were stalked. A possible funnel measuring ~2.4 mm long was preserved with a lateral edge of the head.
