= Mazon Creek fossil beds =

Conservation lagerstätte in Illinois on the National Register of Historic Places

Coordinates: 41.321°N 88.346°W

- Stratigraphic range: ~309–307 Ma

- Mazon Creek Fossil Beds
- U.S. National Register of Historic Places
- U.S. National Historic Landmark
- Location within Illinois Location within the United States
- Nearest city: Benson Road, Morris, Illinois
- NRHP reference No.: 97001272

Significant dates
- Added to NRHP: September 25, 1997
- Designated NHL: September 25, 1997

The Mazon Creek fossil beds are a konservat-lagerstätte found near Morris, in Grundy County, Illinois. The fossils are preserved in ironstone concretions, formed approximately 309 million years ago in the mid-Pennsylvanian epoch of the Carboniferous period. These concretions frequently preserve both hard and soft tissues of animal and plant materials, as well as many soft-bodied organisms that do not normally fossilize. The quality, quantity and diversity of fossils in the area, known since the mid-nineteenth century, make the Mazon Creek lagerstätte important to paleontologists attempting to reconstruct the paleoecology of the sites. The locality was declared a National Historic Landmark in 1997.

== Geology ==
The Mazon Creek fossils are found in the Upper Carboniferous Francis Creek Shale. The type locality is the Mazon River (or Mazon Creek), a tributary of the Illinois River near Morris, Grundy County, Illinois. The 25 to 30 meters of shale were formed approximately 309 million years ago, during the Pennsylvanian period. The fossiliferous concretions are usually found within the thickest deposits of the Francis Creek Shale. The concretions occur in localized deposits within the silty to sandy mudstones, in the lower four metres of the formation. The paleoecosystem was once believed to be a large river delta system, deposited by at least one major river system flowing from the northeast, but it has been reinterpreted as a bay into which some rivers brought some freshwater. The sediments, which show tidal cycles, are believed to derive from the Appalachian orogeny events. The bay had a tropical climate, a result of the area being within 10° north latitude of the equator during the Pennsylvanian.

The remains of plants and animals were rapidly buried by the sediment deposited in the deltaic system. Bacterial decomposition of the remains produced carbon dioxide that combined with dissolved iron from the groundwater. This process formed siderite in the sediments surrounding the remains, forming detailed casts of their structure. Lithification of the sediments formed protective nodules of ironstone around the now fossilized remains. This mode of preservation is known as authigenic mineralisation.

== Location ==
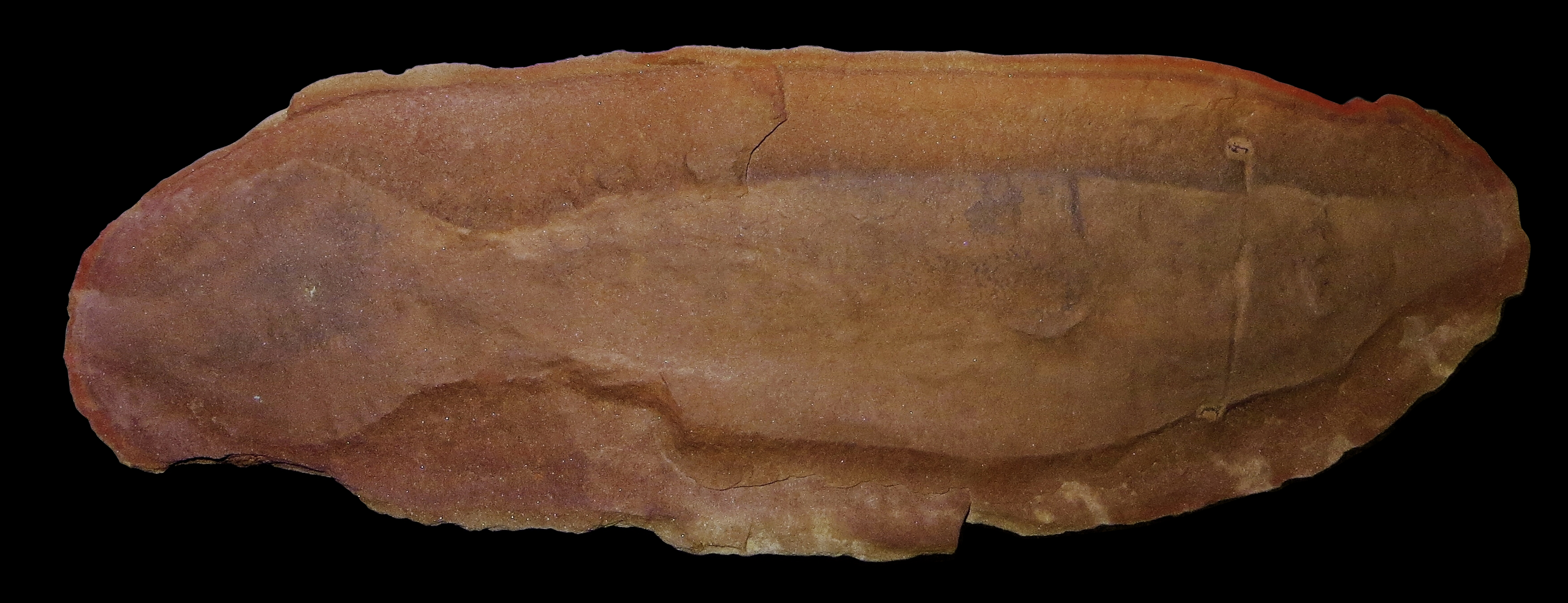
Tullimonstrum gregarium, an enigmatic soft bodied bilaterian animal known only from the Mazon Creek deposits.

The fossiliferous concretions are found in the Mazon River area of Grundy, Will, Kankakee, and Livingston counties. Additional fossils are found in LaSalle County, Illinois; between the Vermilion River and Marseilles, Illinois. The ironstone concretions are recovered from exposures along streams, roadcuts and in active or abandoned coal mine areas.

Most concretions are found among the shale and sandstone that was piled up in either a spoil tip of an older underground mine, or ridges of the later surface mining. The Peabody Energy company operated several large strip mines in Grundy County that are now abandoned. They were named Pit 1 through Pit 11. The northern pits 1-8 are known for the Braidwood Biota with mostly terrestrial fauna and flora. Pit 11, which was located southwest of the town of Braidwood, Illinois, is known for its Essex Biota with a greater abundance of marine species. Pit 11 is now Braidwood State Fish and Wildlife Area, an Illinois state park. Fossil collecting is allowed at the park with a permit.

The site's importance was realized in the mid-nineteenth century: "the nodules of Mazon Creek, where fragments of plants, even of the softest texture, have been preserved in their integrity".

== Flora ==
The Mazon Creek flora comprises over 400 species from at least 130 genera. However, the true number of species is difficult to determine. Paleobotanists name separate plant structures with different names by convention, inflating the number of fossil plant taxa. Paleobotanists are currently determining which taxa are valid.

Mazon Creek flora includes: lycopsids, related to modern club moss, with arborescent forms named Lepidophloios, Sigillaria and Lepidodendron, and herbaceous forms called Lycopodites and Cormophyton; sphenopsids like Calamites a tree-like horsetail relative, with common foliage names of Annularia and Asterophyllites, and a vine-like form called Sphenophyllum; Pteridophyta as marattitalean tree ferns and Filicales and Zygopteridales understory ferns, with common foliage names of Pecopteris, Acitheca and Lobatopteris; pteridosperms, also known as seed ferns, an extinct group of plants that grew both as trees and smaller shrubs, with features like pinnated leaves similar to true ferns, but reproduced by seeds instead of spores; they had common foliage names Mariopteris, Alethopteris, Odontopteris, Neuropteris, Laveineopteris and Macroneuropteris; extinct gymnosperm Cordaites, believed to be closely related to and sharing many features with modern conifers.

== Fauna ==
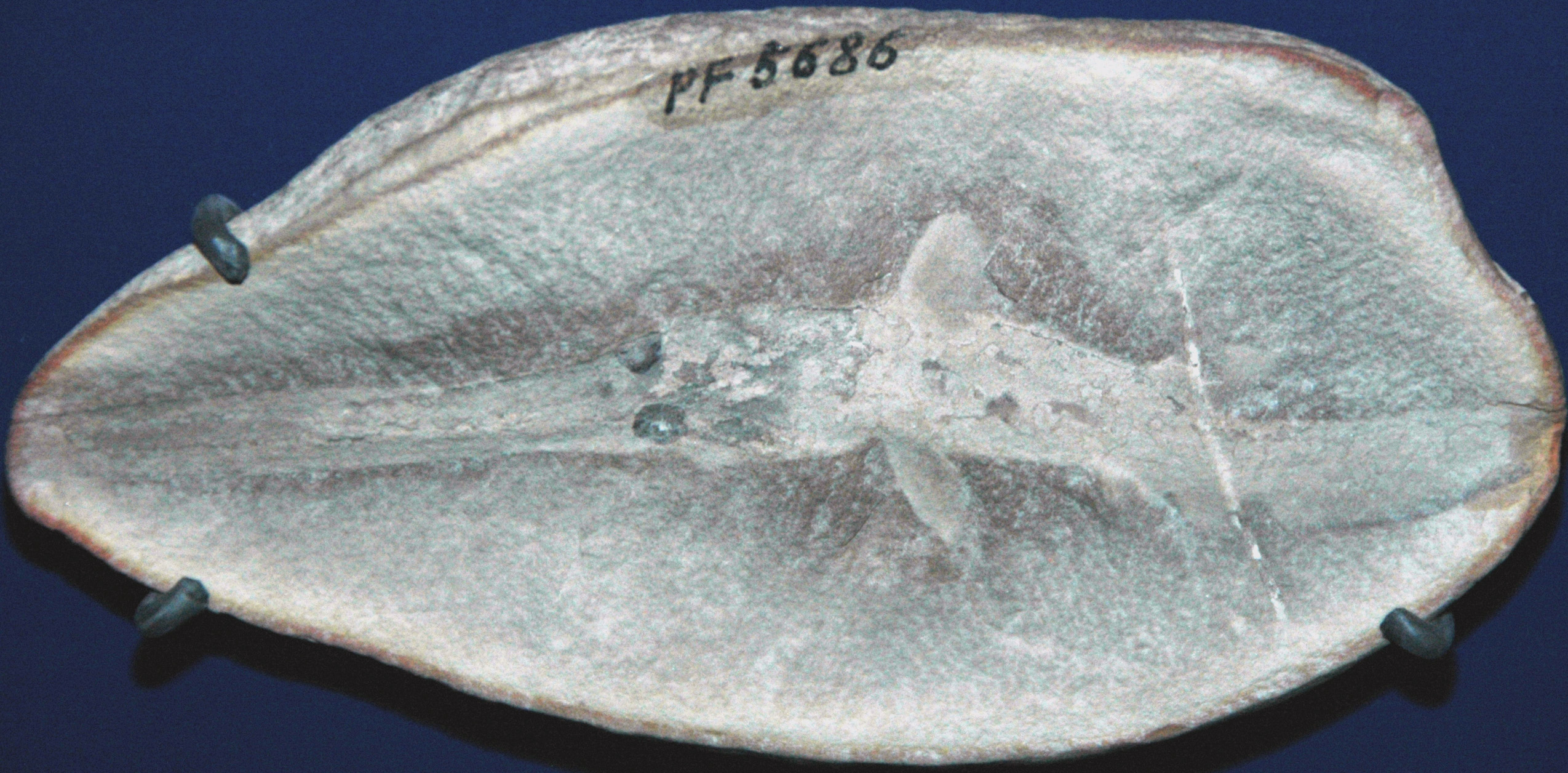
Bandringa rayi fossil shark, Mazon Creek Lagerstatte. This is the holotype specimen of the species. Its size and lack of developed cartilaginous skeletal structures indicate that this is a juvenile.

The Mazon Creek fauna has over 320 species of animals that have been identified. The fauna has traditionally been divided into two components: the marine Essex fauna and the land and purportedly freshwater Braidwood fauna, that were washed into the deltaic sediments. However, as for many other Paleozoic fossiliferous localities, the degree of marine influence seems to have been under-estimated, and the latest studies questioned the presence of a truly freshwater fauna at Mazon Creek and interpreted it instead as deposits from a bay into which some rivers brought some fresh water; no unequivocally freshwater taxon is known there. Thus, the Essex and Braidwood biotas simply represent fossil assemblages preserved far (Essex) or close (Braidwood) to the coast and deltas. Many of the fossils of different plants and animals from the carboniferous that have been found there are on display at the Illinois State Museum in Springfield in their changes dynamic Illinois environments exhibit, and at the Field Museum of Natural History in Chicago in their evolving planet exhibit.

=== Essex biota ===
The Essex fauna includes the invertebrates such as a species of jellyfish called Anthracomedusa turnbulli, sea worms (Nemertea, Priapulida, Chaetognatha, Annelida), snails, saltwater scallops, such as Aviculopecten mazonensis, crustaceans, such as Kallidecthes richardsoni, Belotelson, Tyrannophontes, and Cyclidas such as Americlus americanus, and Apionicon, sea scorpions, such as Adelophthalmus mazonensis, chaetognaths, Etacystis communis, Escumasia roryi, cephalopods such as Jeletzkya douglassae and Pohlsepia mazonensis, two of the three species of Horseshoe crab found the area known as Liomesaspis laevi, and the more rare Paleolimulus mazonensis, Reticulomedusa grennei, the possible hemichordate Etacystis, and the most common species found there, the Essexella asherae sea anemone. It consists of 42% of all fossils finds in the Essex biota. The Essex invertebrate fauna also includes the most famous faunal member of the Illinois state fossil Tullimonstrum, known popularly as the "Tully Monster". Essex fish that have been found include actinopterygians such as Platysomus circularis, some finned sarcopterygians, Agnathas such as Glipichthys greenei, Myxinikela siroka , Mayomyzon pieckoensis, and Pipiscius zangerli, and chondricthyans such as Dabasacanthus inskasi, and a species of shark called Bandringa rayi which sort of resembles a modern paddlefish, a sawfish, or a goblin shark that when the area was still a shallow brackish water estuary, used it as a breeding ground to have their babies.

=== Braidwood biota ===
The Braidwood fauna includes land invertebrates such as insects such as the extinct roachoid Platymylacris paucinervis, Gerarus which has several species such as Geratus vetus, and Gerarus mazonus that are both found in the Mazon Creek area, the possible beetle Adiphlebia, a winged insect called Protodictyon pulchripenne, and the biggest insect found at the creek the Mazothairos enormis. Other invertebrate fauna types that have been found include myriapods such as Mazoscolopendra richarsoni, and the giant Arthropleura cristata. Arachnids that have been found include the phalangiotarbus laceoi, Arthrolycosa antiqua, Geralinura carbonaria, and the newly discovered Douglassarachnea canthopoda . A rare freshwater lobopodian (formerly mistaken for a fireworm) called Palaeocampa anthrax is also found in the Braidwood fauna. Vertebrate fossils include the embolomeri called Spondylerpeton spinatum which sort of resembled a crocodile and was probably the top predator of the area at the time, temnospondyls such as Platyrhinops lyelli, lepospondyls such as Pseudophlegethontiat urnbullorum, Infernovenator steenae, and Nagini mazonense, and a microsaurian called Diabloroter bolti. Fresh water/brackish water creatures include actinopterygians (Illiniichthys), shrimps, ostracods, and the third species of horseshoe crab known from the area called Euproops danae, which was common and probably lived in both saltwater and brackish water. A dubious species of Acanthodes named A. beecheri, an unknown species of Orthacanthus, preserved tetrapod larva fossils, Mazonova, and Helenodora inopinata have also been described from the Braidwood fauna.

== See also ==
- Paleobiota of the Burgess Shale
- Hamilton Quarry
- Paleofauna of the Mazon Creek fossil beds
- Mooreville Chalk
- Paleobiota of the Hell Creek Formation
- Fossil Butte National Monument
- Hagerman Fossil Beds National Monument
- Paleobiota of the La Brea Tar Pits
- Phillips Park (Aurora, Illinois)
