= Illiniichthys =

Illiniichthys Temporal range: Late Moscovian

Scientific classification
- Kingdom: Animalia
- Phylum: Chordata
- Class: Actinopterygii
- Genus: †Illiniichthys; Schultze & Bardack, 1987
- Species: †I. cozarti

Binomial name
- †Illiniichthys cozarti Schultze & Bardack, 1987

Extinct genus of ray-finned fishes

Illiniichthys is an extinct genus of freshwater ray-finned fish that lived during the late Moscovian stage of the Pennsylvanian epoch in what is now Illinois, United States. A single species is known, I. cozarti, known from the Mazon Creek fossil beds. The genus is named after the Illini Native American tribe.
