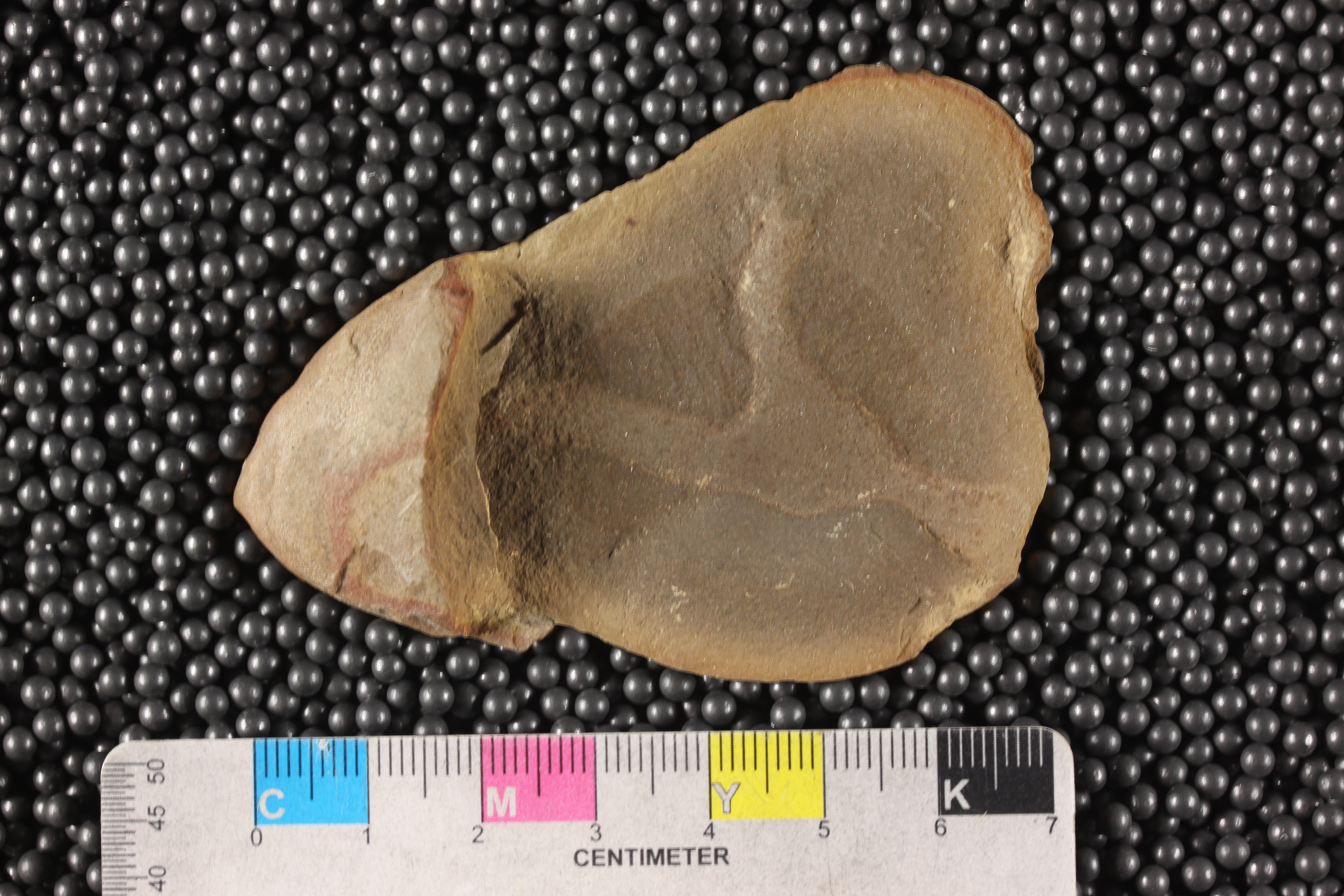
- Fossil of Escumasia
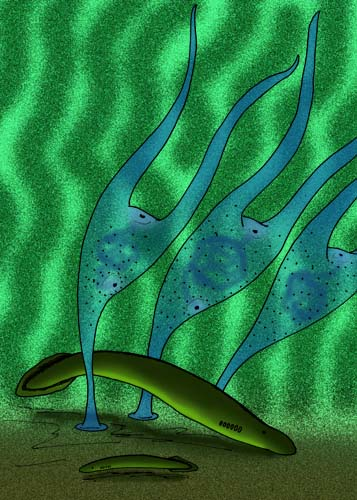
- Three Escumasia alongside individuals of Gilpichthys

Scientific classification
- Kingdom: Animalia
- Phylum: incertae sedis
- Genus: †Escumasia; Nitecki & Solem, 1973
- Species: †E. roryi

Binomial name
- †Escumasia roryi Nitecki & Solem, 1973

= Escumasia =

Escumasia Temporal range: Moscovian

Genus of enigmatic fossil animal

Escumasia roryi is a species of enigmatic animal from the Mazon Creek site. Due to the large quantity of fossils, it has acquired a common name, that being "wye" or "y-animal" in reference to its shape.

== Description ==
Escumasia ranges from 7.5 cm (3.0 in) to 20.5 cm (8.1 in) in length, with a stalk and two long arms making up most of this. These arms show no adaptations for capturing prey, thus their function is unclear. While being covered in cnidocytes and therefore a cnidarian affinity was proposed, this theory is unlikely due to an apparent anal slit on one side of the trunk showing that the organism was likely bilateral and had a "through-gut". The mouth is likely represented by a broad slit between the arms. The stalk is elongate, however rarely appears complete in fossils. The base is a bulbous disc with seemingly no surface features.

== Classification ==
While Escumasia does bear similarities with various cnidarians such as sea anemones, the presence of an anus and therefore a complete gut, alongside bilateral symmetry, makes this relationship problematic. Slight traces of a central cavity within the fossils suggest a large "gastric cavity", likely the stomach. While it shares many similarities with "coelenterates", its bilateral symmetry and through-gut suggest otherwise, and therefore it is currently classified as Animalia incertae sedis.

== Etymology ==
The scientific name Escumasia roryi honours E. Scumas Rory, printer laureate of Illinois paleontology.

== See also ==
- Etacystis – another enigmatic organism commonly nicknamed as the "H-animal"
