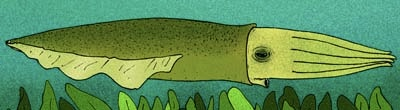
- Artist's reconstruction of Jeletzkya douglassae swimming above a Tullimonstrum.

Scientific classification
- Kingdom: Animalia
- Phylum: Mollusca
- Class: Cephalopoda
- Superorder: †Belemnoidea
- Genus: †Jeletzkya; Johnson & Richardson, 1968
- Species: †J. douglassae

Binomial name
- †Jeletzkya douglassae Johnson & Richardson, 1968

= Jeletzkya =

Jeletzkya Temporal range: Early Pennsylvanian

Genus of belemnoid living during the early Pennsylvanian

Jeletzkya douglassae is a fossil belemnoid from the early Pennsylvanian Mazon Creek lagerstätten and represents the earliest known crown-group squid. Non-mineralized anatomy is preserved and comprises ten hooked tentacles and a radula. It is too poorly understood for assignment to any particular cephalopod taxon. In 2026, it is considered as a synonym of Saundersites illinoisiensis. It had shell about 23.5 mm (0.93 in) long.
