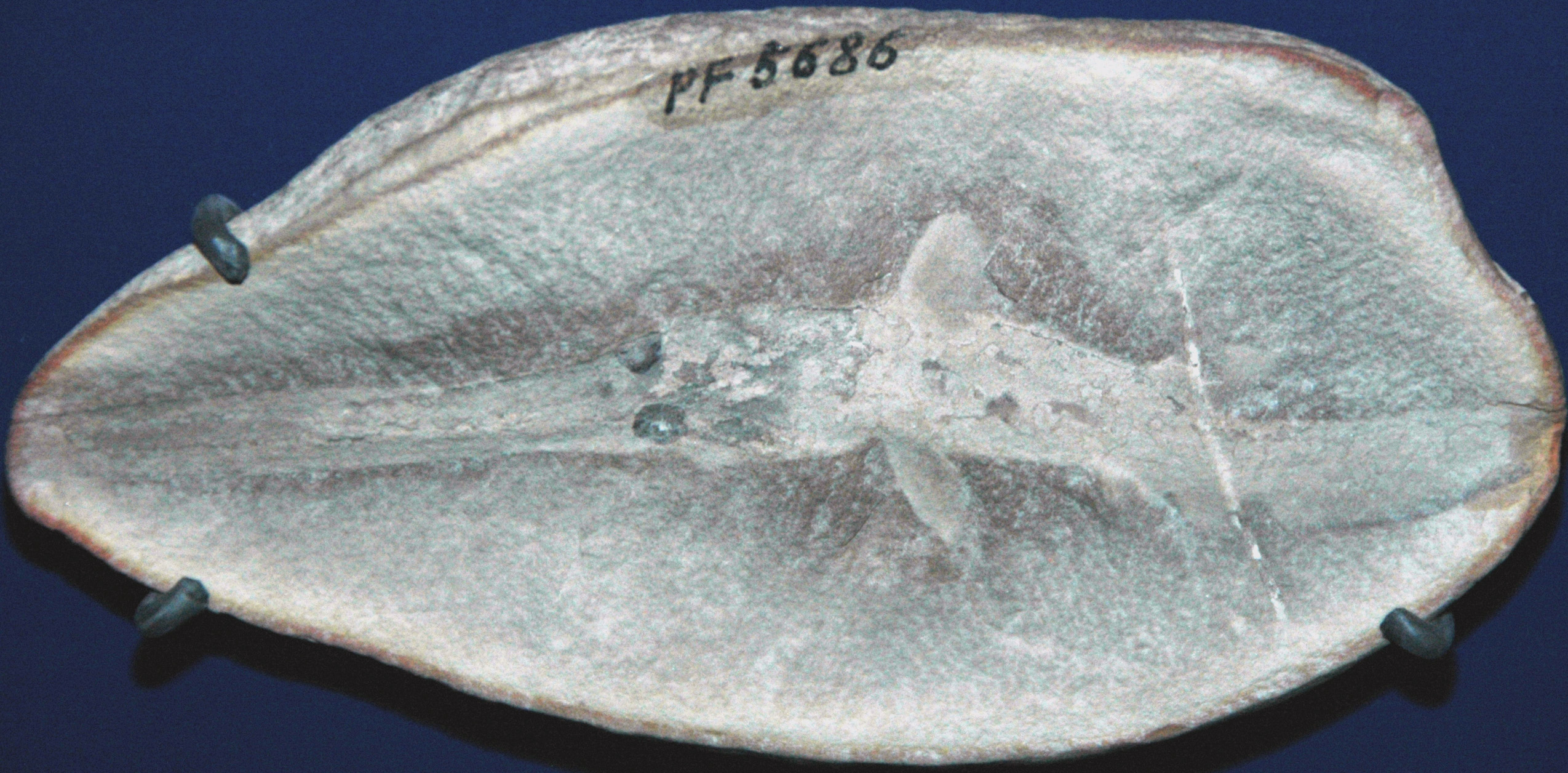
- Bandringa rayi holotype juvenile from the Pennsylvanian of Illinois

Scientific classification
- Kingdom: Animalia
- Phylum: Chordata
- Class: Chondrichthyes
- Subclass: Elasmobranchii
- Family: †Bandringidae; Zangerl, 1969
- Genus: †Bandringa; Zangerl, 1969
- Species: †B. rayi

Binomial name
- †Bandringa rayi Zangerl, 1969

Synonyms
- Bandringa herdinae Zangerl, 1979; Similihariotta? Zangerl, 1979

= Bandringa =

Bandringa Temporal range: Pennsylvanian, ~309–307 Ma

Extinct genus of cartilaginous fishes

Bandringa is an extinct genus of elasmobranch known from the Pennsylvanian subperiod of the Carboniferous period. There is currently a single known species, B. rayi, which constitutes the sole member of the monotypic family Bandringidae. The genus was described in 1969 by paleontologist Rainer Zangerl, and is known from exceptionally preserved individuals found in the Mazon Creek Lagerstätte of Illinois.

== Discovery and naming ==
The holotype specimen, FMNH PF 5686, is a juvenile individual which was found in an ironstone concretion in Illinois during the summer of 1967. This specimen was found by Ray Bandringa, to whom the genus and species owe their name. By 1979, two species from this genus were described, B. rayi and B. herdinae, but the differences between the two were found to be taphonomic in origin. All Mazon Creek individuals appear to represent juveniles, suggesting the area was a nursery for them. Also supporting this notion are fossilized egg cases found in the same localities, though it is unclear whether they belong to this genus. Adult fossils attributed to B. rayi have also been found in spoil heaps from Five Points coal mines near Conesville, Ohio and Cannelton, Pennsylvania, both of which contain rocks of the Kittaning Formation of the Allegheny Group which were roughly contemporaneous with the Mazon Creek deposits. This material includes a partial skull and complete rostrum which are roughly 16 cm (6.2 in) in length.

== Description ==
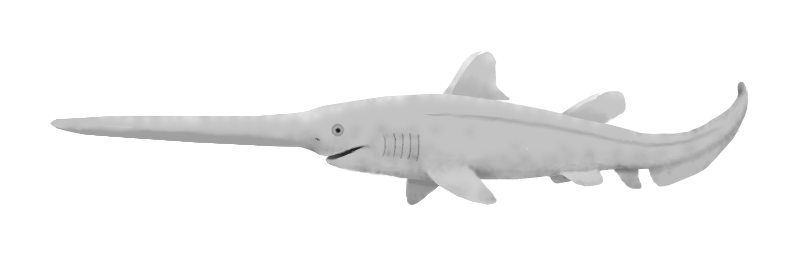
Artist's impression of Bandringa rayi

Bandringa was a unique looking fish. The most noticeable part of this elasmobranch is its very long snout, which made up half of its body. The snout looks similar to that seen in the unrelated actinopterygian fish family Polyodontidae (Acipenseriformes). The body of Bandringa had two dorsal fins, a set of three anal fins (5 in total) and a long tapering Heterocercal caudal fin. Bandringa had a long rostrum and may have been analogous to modern sawfish. It appears to have fed via suction feeding, and used its long snout and needle like spines on its cheek for hunting in murky water. Preserved gut contents include articulated arthropods. The holotype specimen is around 11 cm (4.3 in) in total length, but the largest known adult specimen, PU19814 is estimated to be more than five times larger than the holotype. While Bandringa was originally described as an aberrant member of the order Ctenacanthiformes, its relationships to other elasmobranchs is currently unclear.

=== Breeding ===
Bandringa is one of the few fossil fish that has a well studied breeding cycle. Sallan and coauthors in 2014 found that the fish lived a lifestyle that was the opposite of salmon, with the adults living in freshwater areas and the younger ones living in more brackish and saltwater areas, and when fully grown would swim back into the freshwater areas. This makes sense because at the time, the area of Illinois where Bandringa specimens have been found was a diagonally running stream that ran from freshwater to saltwater areas.
