= Octopodiformes =

Superorder of molluscs

== Description ==
Octopodiformes Temporal range: Early Jurassic – recent The oldest fossils of stem-group octopods appeared in the Serpukhovian (late Mississippian)
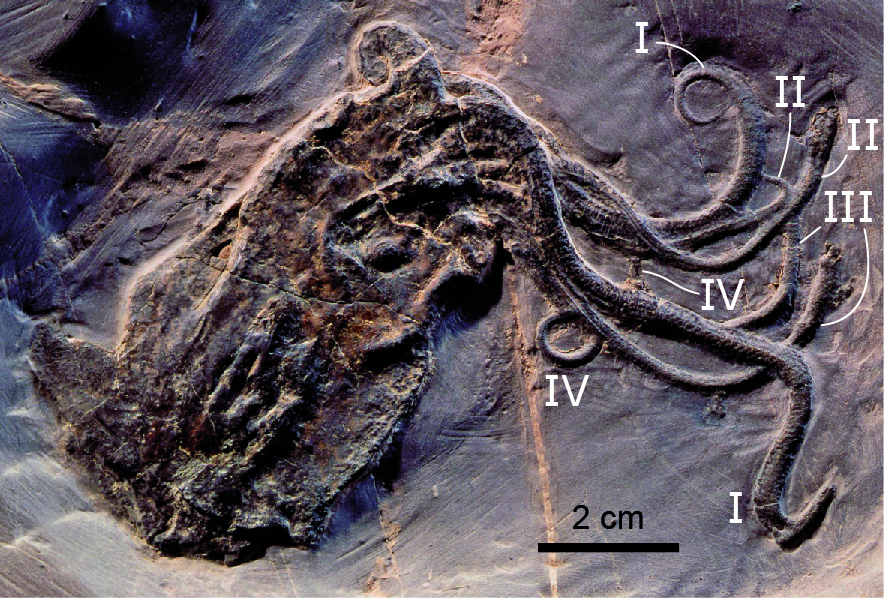
- Fossil of Proteroctopus from the Middle Jurassic of France, now thought to be a basal vampyropode or vampyromorph

Scientific classification
- Kingdom: Animalia
- Phylum: Mollusca
- Class: Cephalopoda
- Subclass: Coleoidea
- Division: Neocoleoidea
- Clade: Vampyropoda
- Superorder: Octopodiformes; Fuchs, Von Boletzky, & Tischlinger, 2010

Subgroups
- See text.

Synonyms
- Octobrachia Fiorini, 1981; Vampyropoda Boletzky, 1992

Octopodiformes is a superorder of the subclass Coleoidea, comprising the octopuses and the vampire squid. Octopodiformes is often considered the crown group of octopuses and vampire squids, including all descendants of their common ancestor. Some authors use the term Vampyropoda for the same general category, though others use "Vampyropoda" to refer to the total group (all cephalopods closer to octopods than to true squid). Another term is Octobrachia, referring to cephalopods without prominent tentacles.

== Evolution ==
Pohlsepia, originally described as the earliest octopod, is now considered as dubious for this group according to a later study. Syllipsimopodi, a squid-like cephalopod from the Mississippian-age Bear Gulch Lagerstätte of Montana, was originally described as the oldest unambiguous vampyropod. However, further analyses might be necessary to unequivocally assign this cephalopod to Vampyropoda. Syllipsimopodi has a combination of squid-like features (like 10 arms) and octopod-like features (like biserial suckers and a simplified internal shell).

The Octopodiformes and the Decapodiformes (having 10 arms) split into two separate superorders over 300 million years ago. While the vampire squid is a member of Octopodiformes it still shares many traits and features with other squids and cuttlefish (in the superorder Decapodiformes) such as chromosomal make up.

It is considered one of the two extant groups of the Neocoleoidea.

== Biology ==
All living members of Octopodiformes have eight arms, either lacking the two tentacles of squid (as is the case in octopuses) or modifying the tentacles into thin filaments (as in vampire squid).The suckers found on Octopodiformes have radial symmetry and lack horny rings found in Decapodiformes. The head of these species is dorsally fused to the mantle tissue directly. Octopodiformes also possess unique gill features allowing them to increase their oxygen efficiency which lets them live in low oxygen habitats.

Octopuses have three functioning hearts with different purposes. Two of these hearts are used to supply blood to the organisms gills, while the other supplies blood to the rest of the body.

== Behaviors ==
Octopuses are highly intelligent creatures. Researchers have supported the fact that they have both short-term and long-term memory storage. In addition, octopuses use a combination of jet propulsion and camouflage to escape from predators.

Vampire squids on the other hand also use jet propulsion to escape predators, but they also use their ability to regenerate the tips of their arms to their advantage. Their arms are placed far enough away from the rest of their body so that they can generally divert any attacks away from the more vital parts of their bodies.

== Habitat & Diet ==
Octopodiformes occupy habitats ranging from deep ocean waters to shallow reefs, but they are most often found in small crevices and holes in rocks or in some cases coral. This superorder diet consists of a large variety of other marine organisms including, snails, crabs, small fishes, and clams.

== Scientific Classification ==
Kingdom: Animalia

Phylum: Mollusca

Class: Cephalopoda

Subclass: Coleoidea

Division: Neocoleoidea

Clade: Vampyropoda

Superorder: Octopodiformes
