= Soft-bodied organism =

Organism that lacks a rigid skeleton

Soft-bodied organisms are organisms that lack rigid physical skeletons or frame, roughly corresponds to the group Vermes as proposed by Carl von Linné. The term typically refers to non-panarthropod invertebrates from the kingdom Animalia, although many non-vascular plants (mosses and algae), fungi (such as jelly fungus), lichens and slime molds can also be seen as soft-bodied organisms by definition.

All animals have a muscular system of some sort but, since myocytes are tensile actuator units that can only contract and pull but never push, some animals evolved rigid body parts upon which the muscles can attach and act as levers/cantilevers to redirect force and produce locomotive propulsion. These rigid parts also serve as structural elements to resist gravity and ambient pressure, as well as sometimes provide protective surfaces shielding internal structures from trauma and exposure to external thermal, chemical and pathogenic insults. Such physical structures are the commonly referred "skeletons", which may be internal (as in vertebrates, echinoderms and sponges) or external (as in arthropods and non-coleoid molluscs). However, many soft-bodied animals do still have a functional skeleton maintained by body fluid hydrostatics known as a hydroskeleton, such as that of earthworms, jellyfish, tapeworms, squids and an enormous variety of invertebrates from almost every phyla of the animal kingdom; and many have hardened teeth that allow them to chew, bite and burrow despite the rest of body being soft.

== Commonality ==
Most soft-bodied animals are small, but they do make up the majority of the animal biomass. If we were to weigh up all animals on Earth with hard parts against soft-bodied ones, estimates indicate that the biomass of soft-bodied animals would be at least twice that of animals with hard parts, quite possibly much larger. Particularly the roundworms are extremely numerous. The nematodologist Nathan Cobb described the ubiquitous presence of nematodes on Earth as follows:

"In short, if all the matter in the universe except the nematodes were swept away, our world would still be dimly recognizable, and if, as disembodied spirits, we could then investigate it, we should find its mountains, hills, vales, rivers, lakes, and oceans represented by a film of nematodes. The location of towns would be decipherable, since for every massing of human beings there would be a corresponding massing of certain nematodes. Trees would still stand in ghostly rows representing our streets and highways. The location of the various plants and animals would still be decipherable, and, had we sufficient knowledge, in many cases even their species could be determined by an examination of their erstwhile nematode parasites."

== Anatomy ==
Being a morphological grouping rather than a true phylogenetic group, soft-bodied organisms vary enormously in anatomy. Cnidarians and flatworms have a single opening to the gut and a diffuse nerve system. The roundworms, annelids, molluscs, the various lophoporate phyla and non-vertebrate chordates have a tubular gut open at both ends. While the majority of the soft-bodied animals typically don't have any kind of skeleton, some do, mainly in the form of stiff cuticles (roundworms, water bears) or hydrostatic skeletons (annelids).

While lack of a skeleton typically restricts the body size of soft-bodied animals on land, marine representatives can grow to very large sizes. The heaviest soft-bodied organisms are likely the giant squids, with maximum weight estimated at 275 kilograms (606 lb) for females, while arctic lion's mane jellyfish may reach comparable sizes. The longest animal on record is also thought to be a soft-bodied organism, a 55 metres (180 ft) long thread-like bootlace worm, Lineus longissimus found on a Scottish beach 1864. Siphonophores may grow to considerable sizes too, though they are colonial organisms, and each single animal is small. Most soft-bodied organisms are as small or smaller, even microscopic. The various organisms grouped as mesozoans and the curious Placozoa are typically composed of just a few hundred cells.

== Fossil record ==
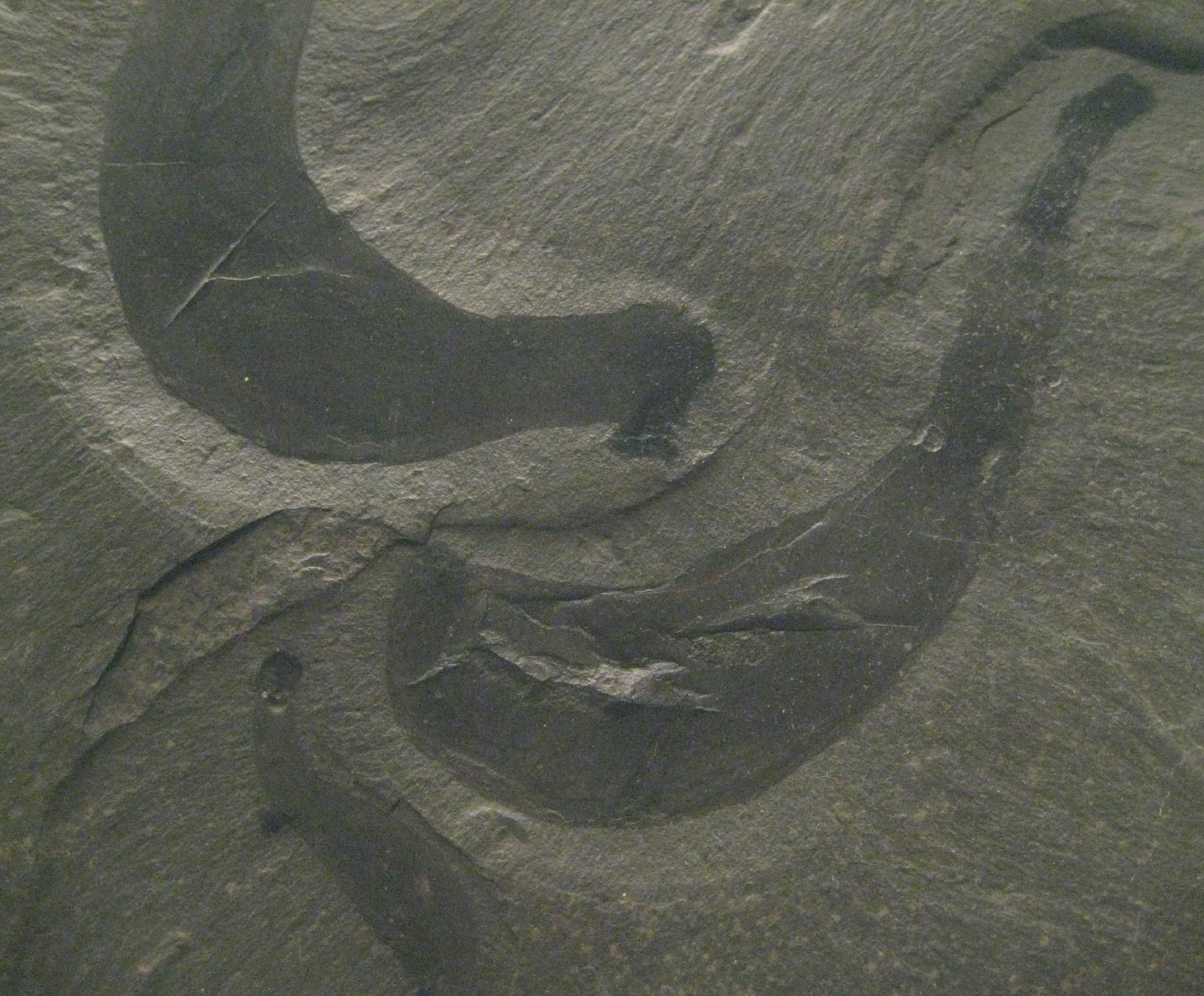
The exceptional Burgess Shale site preserve soft-bodied organisms like these priapulids.

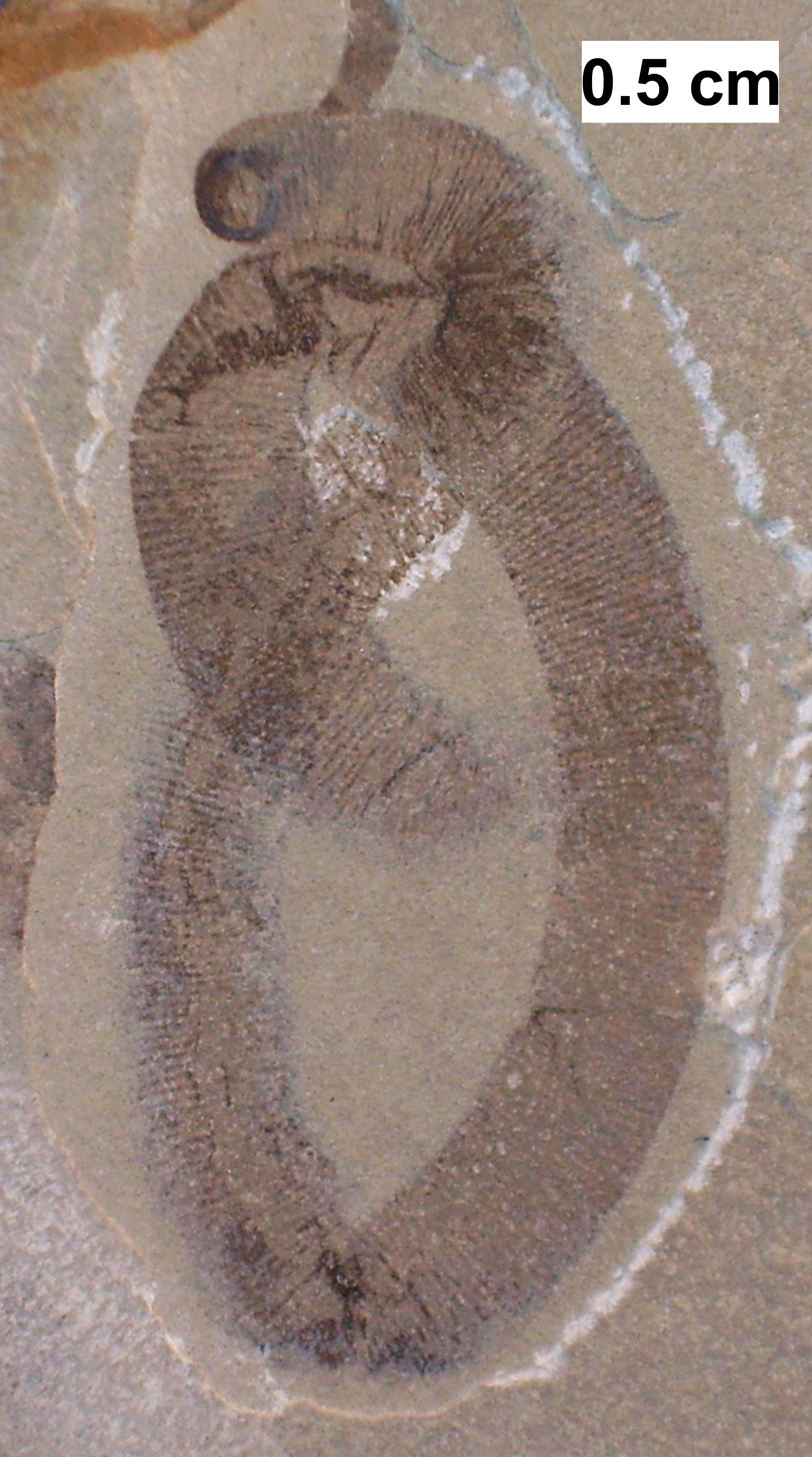
Like the Burgess Shale, the Waukesha Biota, from the Silurian of Wisconsin, preserves many soft-bodied organisms, such as this cycloneuralian worm.

Examples of gaps within the fossil record of delicate and soft-bodied animals display numerous discontinuities of 150 Myr and more

The lack of hard parts in soft-bodied organisms makes them extremely rare in the fossil record. Accordingly, the evolutionary histories of many of the soft-bodied groups are poorly known. The first major find of fossil soft-bodied animals was from the Burgess Shale in Canada. Today, several sites with Burgess Shale type preservation are known, but the history of many groups of soft-bodied animals is still poorly understood.
