= Microeledone galapagensis =

Scientific classification
- Kingdom: Animalia
- Phylum: Mollusca
- Class: Cephalopoda
- Order: Octopoda
- Family: Megaleledonidae
- Genus: Microeledone
- Species: M. galapagensis

Binomial name
- Microeledone galapagensis Voight et al., 2026

Species of octopus

Microeledone galapagensis is a species of small octopus. In 2015, the holotype was discovered off the coast of Darwin Island in the Galápagos region of the Pacific 1,773 m (5,817 ft) below the surface. In May 2026, researchers from the Charles Darwin Foundation determined the specimen was a new species.

== Description ==
Microeledone galapagensis possesses a light blue, almost colorless, back and a dark purple inner mantle. This reverse countershading acts as a camouflage from predators, while the cephalopod feeds on bioluminescent creatures. This species of octopus has a squat body with notably short arms and smooth, pigment-free skin. It lacks an ink sac as well as anal flaps, a crop diverticulum, papillose dorsal mantle, and thin funnel organ. Orally, the animal exhibits a large, central tooth. The octopus measures around 6 cm (2.4 in) from the top of the mantle to the base. The length of the mantle of the octopus captured was 31.5 mm (1.24 in), and the average sucker diameter was 1.7 mm (0.067 in). On average, each arm was 38.5 mm (1.52 in) long and had 31 suckers. The specimen collected carried thirteen eggs in its ovaries. This species belongs to the suborder Incirrata.

== Discovery ==
External videos
- Video of the octopus on the sea floor taken from ROV Hercules courtesy of the Charles Darwin Foundation

The octopus, captured and studied by a research team aboard the EV Nautilus piloting the ROV Hercules, was a female collected at 1,773 m (5,817 ft) on July 1, 2015. Three other octopods observed appeared to be morphologically consistent with this species that were observed between 1,770 m (5,810 ft) and 2,006 m (6,581 ft). All of the octopods observed as well as the one female that was captured and studied were seen resting on sandy substrate.

The research team had trouble identifying the octopus and sent first photos then the preserved specimen itself to Janet Voight, an octopus expert and curator at the Field Museum in Chicago. Voight was intrigued as similar octopuses had been found instead in the south Atlantic, an environment completely different from the equatorial Pacific, making convergent evolution a less likely explanation than common ancestry. The specimen shared some features with known Thaumeledone species and other features with the only species in Microeledone at the time, Microeledone mangoldi. Due to the specimen's uniqueness and the effort needed to collect it, Voight prioritized preserving its integrity and forwent the usual species identification method of dissection. Instead, she sent it to Smith and the museum's X-ray lab to take micro CT scans of the specimen. Even without a contrast agent, the scans revealed enough detail in the soft organs of the specimen to build a 3D model sufficient for species identification.
