= Graneledone yamana =

Conservation status
- Least Concern (IUCN 3.1)

Scientific classification
- Kingdom: Animalia
- Phylum: Mollusca
- Class: Cephalopoda
- Order: Octopoda
- Family: Megaleledonidae
- Genus: Graneledone
- Species: G. yamana

Binomial name
- Graneledone yamana Guerrero-Kommritz, 2000

Species of mollusc

Graneledone yamana is a species of octopus in the genus Graneledone.

== Description ==
G. yamana is assigned to this genus because of the absence of an ink sac and crop, the presence of cartilaginous warts covering the body cavity, uniserial suckers on the arms, and a reduced radula. Its identifying characteristics are papillose skin, two horns located above the eyes, small gills, and five to seven lamellae located on the outside of the demibranch. The arms of G. yamana have 35–80 suckers on the females and 26–70 on the males. G. yamana physically resembles the species Graneledone verrucosa, except the cartilaginous warts on the body cavities of both these species differ. G. verruscosa is also found in the North Atlantic Ocean instead of the South.

== Distribution ==
This species is known from the southwest Atlantic Ocean off the coasts of Uruguay, Argentina, and southern Brazil. G. yamana is the fifth species of Graneledone found in the southern oceans. This genus has been found in the deep waters near hydrothermal vents.
