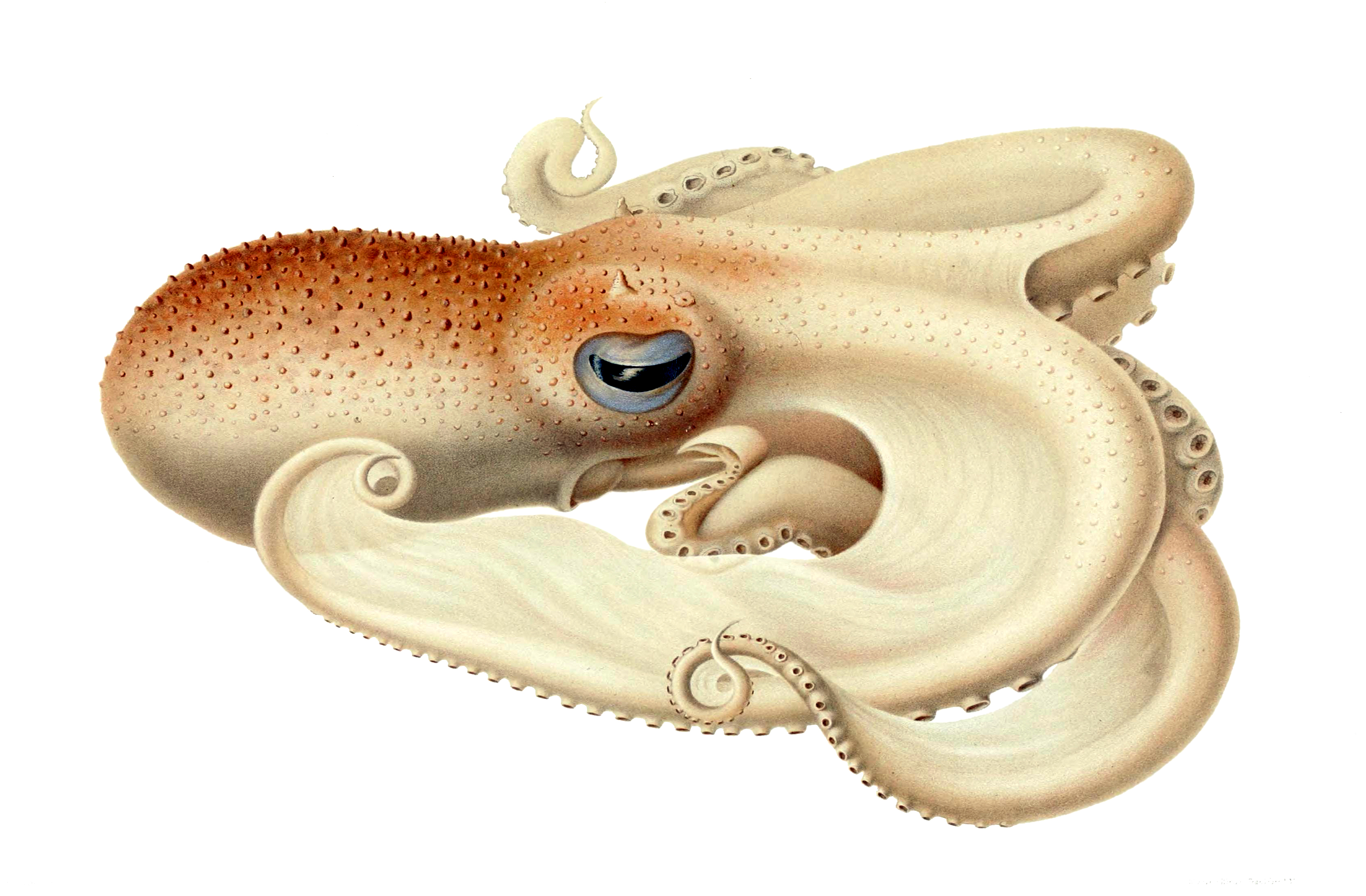

Conservation status
- Data Deficient (IUCN 3.1)

Scientific classification
- Kingdom: Animalia
- Phylum: Mollusca
- Class: Cephalopoda
- Order: Octopoda
- Family: Megaleledonidae
- Genus: Velodona; Chun, 1915
- Species: V. togata

Binomial name
- Velodona togata Chun, 1915

Subspecies
- Velodona togata togata Chun, 1915; Velodona togata capensis Robson, 1924

= Velodona =

Genus of octopuses

Velodona togata is a species of octopus in the monotypic genus Velodona. First described by Carl Chun in 1915, with a second subspecies discovered by Guy Coburn Robson in 1924, it was named for the distinctive membranes on its arms.

Described as being similar to members of the genera Pareledone, Eledone, and Enteroctopus, V. togata has a large body with large eyes and extensive membranes that link the octopus' arms together. The species has a single line of suckers on each arm, and its head, mantle, and part of its arms are covered in warts. Although the reproductive habits of V. togata have not been extensively studied, the species is believed to be one of the most fecund among octopuses in its region and depth level, despite the species possessing large eggs and extremely large spermatophores.

The species is found in the Indian Ocean, off the coast of South Africa, Mozambique, and Tanzania. The species has been captured from depths between 400 and 750 meters below sea level, and a 2009 study found the species most heavily concentrated between 400 and 600 meters below sea level. V. togata's conservation status has not been assessed.

== Taxonomy ==
Velodona togata is a species of octopus, and the sole member of the genus Velodona. It belongs to the family Megaleledonidae, in the order Octopoda. The species was first discovered by Carl Chun in 1915. It has two subspecies, Velodona togata togata — the subspecies originally identified by Chun in 1915 — and Velodona togata capensis, which was first described by Guy Coburn Robson in 1924. The genus and species were named after the distinctive membranes on Velodona togata togata's arms. Velo is Latin for "veil" and toga is Latin for "gown" or "mantle".

== Description ==
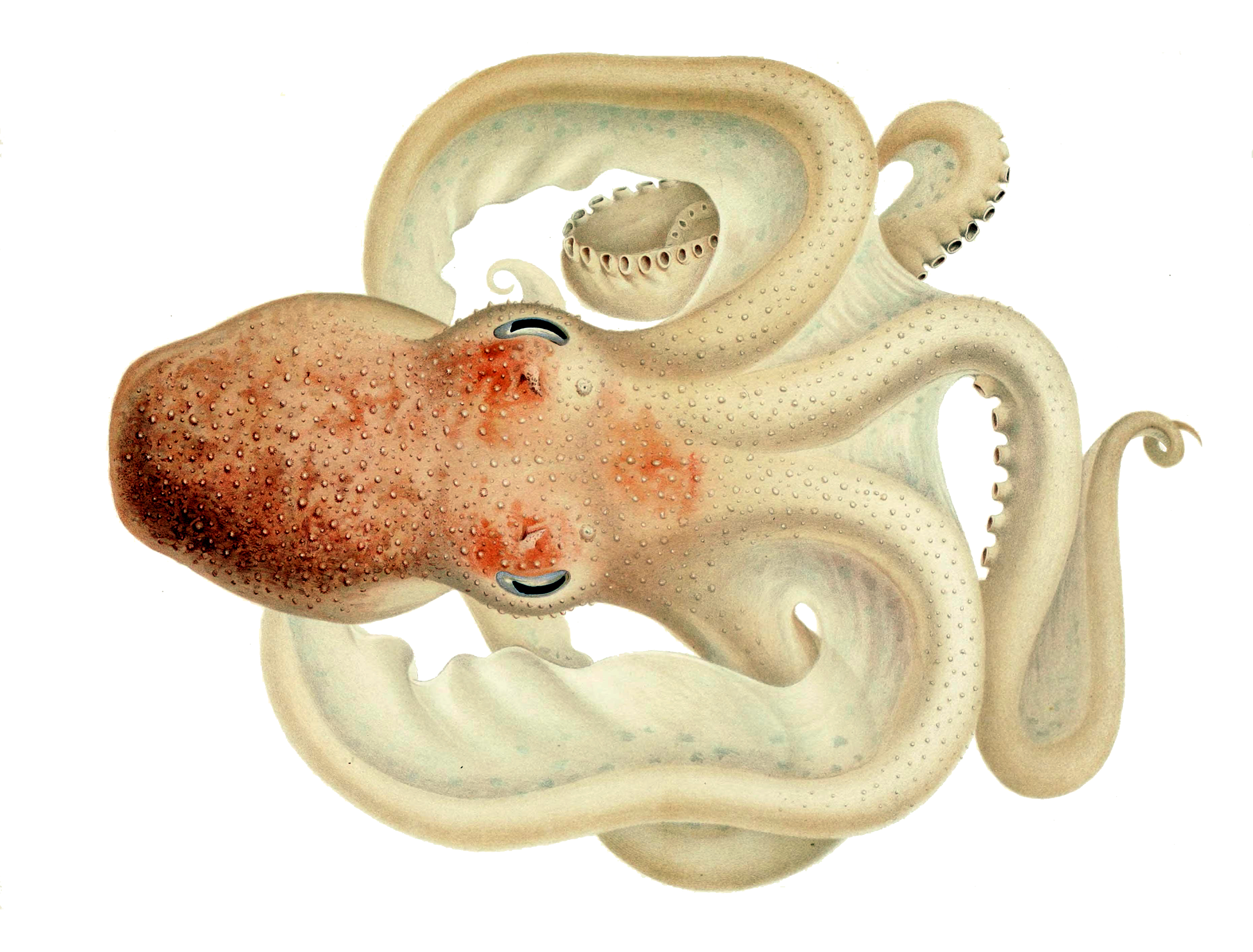
A top-down view of V. togata, showing the membranes connecting the arms

Chun described the first specimen he caught, a male, as looking similar to the genus Eledone, but with larger membranes, a differently shaped hectocotylus, and a differently shaped funnel organ (siphon). The specimen had "a sac-shaped body and very large eyes", with arms that "are folded back and have very large membranes which enclose the whole animal", and had a "characteristic pale coloration". Reiterating Chun, Guy Robson summarized the differences between Eledone and V. togata as "the possession of (a) a funnel organ composed of two separate pieces, (b) a sigmoid bend in the hectocotylized arm, and (c) the development of extensive lateral membranes on the arms". Robson, however, was not fully convinced that the shape of the hectocotylized arm was of value in identifying the species, positing that the curve could have been caused by a shrinkage of the membrane. In comparing the distinctive features of V. togata with other known octopus species, Robson found similarities between V. togata and species in the genera Moschites (now considered a synonym for Pareledone and Eledone, the former now considered to be in the family Megaleledonidae and the latter in the family Eledonidae), and Polypus (now considered a synonym for Enteroctopus, in the family Enteroctopodidae). He found V. togata closest to the southern species of Moschites, such as M. charcoti (now Pareledone charcoti) and M. brevis (now Eledone massyae), due to having similar funnel organs and suckers as those species.

The specimen's head, mantle, and dorsal arms were covered in warts of varying sizes. Chun measured the specimen's mantle as being 99 millimeters wide and 80 millimeters long. The specimen's head was as wide as the mantle, and was dominated by large eyes, which were measured as 38 millimeters wide and 53 millimeters long, with sickle-shaped pupils. Chun described the arms as being "well developed", and noted that the dorsal arms were the longest, and the arms got shorter as they moved to the ventral end. V. togata has a single line of suckers on each arm. Chun described the membranes on the arms in detail, stating that "The arms bear dorsal and ventral membranes. The ventral margins are unusually large and extend to the tip of all arms. They are not restricted to the ventral surface but also extend to the dorsal margin of the neighboring ventral arms, where they again continue to the tip, but are more weakly developed.". The hectocotylus is on the third arm. V. togata contains an ink sac, but it is tiny and does not contain any ink, a common trait in cephalopods that live in deep water where there is little or no light.

Velodona togata capensis, the subspecies first described by Guy Coburn Robson in 1924, differs from Velodona togata togata in three areas that Robson considered significant. Where the mantle of Chun's specimen (Velodona togata togata) was significantly wider than it is long, the mantles of Robson's specimens had a much smaller difference between width and length, with one specimen having a mantle with identical width and length. The length of the membrane that links the octopus's arms — the umbrella — was shorter in Robson's specimens than in Chun's, and there were additional warts with papillates on his specimens that were not described in Chun's specimen. Robson also noted a significant difference in the hectocotylus in Chun's specimen and those in his specimens. He noted that while two of his specimens appeared to be fully sexually developed, their hectocotyli looked comparatively underdeveloped. Owing to the difference in overall size between Chun's and Robson's specimens, however, Robson conjectured that the difference in hectocotyli may be due to the specimens' ages. Robson described the coloring of the specimens as "a rather deep reddish brown (verging in a distinctly purple shade in one)" for the males, with a "darker brown" for the female.

== Reproduction ==
Little is known about the reproductive habits of V. togata. A 2009 study, the first to focus on V. togata, conjectured that "The high proportion of immature females obtained in the survey (76%) and the low proportion of mature females (10%) could indicate that the spawning season is finishing at the beginning of the autumn. Moreover, the wide size range of the sampled population, with a considerable number of small individuals (possibly only a few days old), suggests the existence of an extended reproduction period.". Analyzing the spermatophores and eggs of the captured specimens, the 2009 study found that V. togata had a low fecundity value, with females having large eggs and males producing a low number of large spermatophores (the largest reported of any deep-sea member of the suborder Incirrina). Despite this, the species was still one of the most fecund among "deep-sea octopods that inhabit the Southern Ocean".

== Habitat and distribution ==
The first specimen of Velodona togata (Velodona togata togata) was captured off the east coast of Africa at a depth of 749 meters below sea level. The four specimens described by Guy Robson as being members of a separate subspecies (Velodona togata capensis) were caught off the "Natal coast" (modern KwaZulu-Natal coast, South Africa) at depths of between 220 fathoms (402.3 meters) and 250 fathoms (460 meters). According to the Integrated Taxonomic Information System (ITIS) database, Velodona togata togata is possibly located in the waters north of Zanzibar, Tanzania, while Velodona togata capensis is located off of the "Natal coast, South Africa". (Note: ITIS expresses the locality of Velodona togata togata as "North of Zanzibar [?]")

In 2009, a Spanish research vessel conducted a study of the cephalopod population off the coast of Mozambique. The study found populations of V. togata across the entire study area, which ran most of the coast of Mozambique, with especially high concentrations at the very southern end of the Mozambiquan coast, in the waters near the city of Maputo. The study performed trawls in four depth groups, 200–400, 400–500, 500–600, and 600–700 meters below sea level. While V. togata was found in all four depth ranges, they were most abundant between 400 and 600 meters below sea level. The study also noted that males were most common in the shallower two groups, while females were more common in the deeper two groups.

== Status ==
The conservation status of V. togata was assessed as data deficient by the IUCN Red List of Threatened Species in 2018.
