= Thaumeledone gunteri =

Conservation status
- Least Concern (IUCN 3.1)

Scientific classification
- Kingdom: Animalia
- Phylum: Mollusca
- Class: Cephalopoda
- Order: Octopoda
- Family: Megaleledonidae
- Genus: Thaumeledone
- Species: T. gunteri

Binomial name
- Thaumeledone gunteri Robson, 1930

Species of mollusc

Thaumeledone gunteri is a species of small, benthic, deep-sea octopus found in the bathyal zone in the Southern Ocean near South Georgia.

== Description ==
The mantle length of Thaumeledone gunteri is typically about 5 cm (2.0 in) and the total length is 10 cm (3.9 in), the arms being relatively short at 5 cm. The background colour is whitish, but the dorsal and ventral surfaces are covered by large, irregular, deep purple tubercles. The web linking the arms is uniformly pale. The head is narrower than the mantle, with several large tubercles above the eye. The eight arms are joined by a deep web, with about 35 small suckers on each arm. The funnel organ is "VV"-shaped and there are five elements in the radula. The posterior salivary gland, a diagnostic feature in this genus, has a diameter of 11 mm.

== Phylogenetic relationships ==
The funnel organ in T. gunteri is similar to that in Thaumeledone peninsulae and they both share a characteristic loop in the rectum. Thaumeledone rotunda is a circumpolar species found at greater depths and has several morphological features differing from the other two species. Despite this, a phylogenetic study undertaken in 2008 of the molecular relationships in the genus, determined that T. gunteri and T. rotunda are sister taxa and that T. peninsulae is more distantly related.

== Distribution ==
T. gunteri is found in the far south Atlantic Ocean in an area around South Georgia, including the Shag Rocks, ranging from 53°S to 55°S and 39°W to 35°W. It has been caught by trawling at depths of 364–964 m (1,194–3,163 ft), but may well occur at greater depths, as these waters are relatively underexplored.
