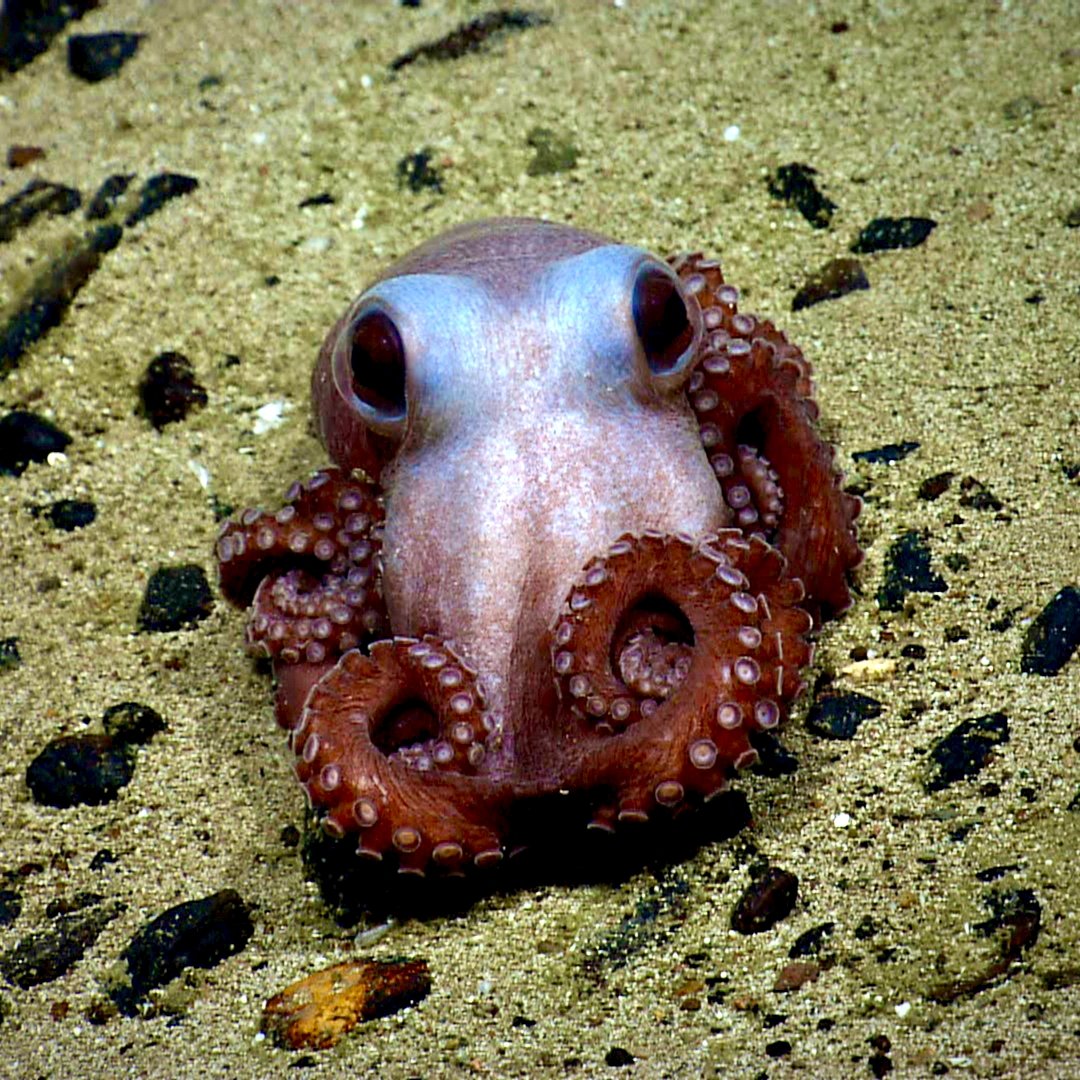

Conservation status
- Least Concern (IUCN 3.1)

Scientific classification
- Kingdom: Animalia
- Phylum: Mollusca
- Class: Cephalopoda
- Order: Octopoda
- Family: Megaleledonidae
- Genus: Adelieledone
- Species: A. polymorpha

Binomial name
- Adelieledone polymorpha Robson, 1930

Synonyms
- Graneledone polymorpha G. C. Robson, 1930; Pareledone polymorpha (G. C. Robson, 1930)

= Adelieledone polymorpha =

Species of octopus

Adelieledone polymorpha, or the Antarctic knobbed octopus, is a species of octopus found in the Antarctic. It was first described by Guy Coburn Robson in 1930, based on specimens found in South Georgia.

== Taxonomy ==
Robson originally placed Adelieledone polymorpha in the genus Graneledone. It was then placed in the genus Pareledone, but was moved to the genus Adelieledone in 2003. Robson also split Adelieledone polymorpha into two varieties, oblonga and affinis; that distinction was removed in 2003 as it was likely a result of deformation and misclassification of specimens.

== Description ==
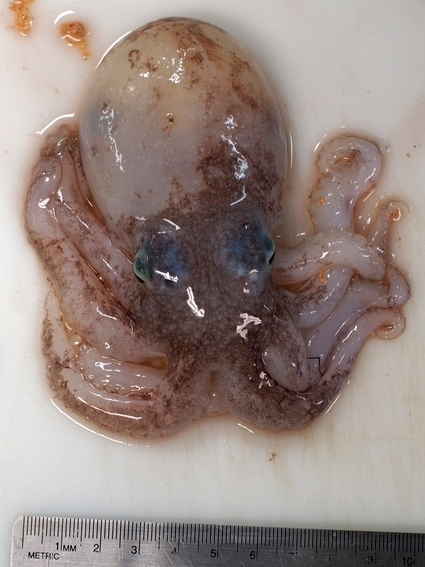
Dead specimen

Adelieledone polymorpha is of moderate size and robust, with a mantle length of up to 60 millimeters, and a total length of up to 200 millimeters.
