= A. polymorpha =

A. polymorpha may refer to:

- Actinoseris polymorpha, a plant native to Brazil
- Adelieledone polymorpha, a cephalopod mollusc
- Amphiroa polymorpha, a thalloid alga
- Amphisphaeria polymorpha, a fungus with perithecial fruiting bodies
- Amyris polymorpha, a plant endemic to Cuba
- Anomis polymorpha, an owlet moth
- Apodochloris polymorpha, a green alga
- Asperitas polymorpha, a land snail
- Azteca polymorpha, a Neotropical ant
