= Graneledone challengeri =

Conservation status
- Least Concern (IUCN 3.1)

Scientific classification
- Kingdom: Animalia
- Phylum: Mollusca
- Class: Cephalopoda
- Order: Octopoda
- Family: Megaleledonidae
- Genus: Graneledone
- Species: G. challengeri

Binomial name
- Graneledone challengeri (S. S. Berry, 1916)

Species of octopus

Graneledone challengeri is a species of octopus that belongs to the family Megaleledonidae.
