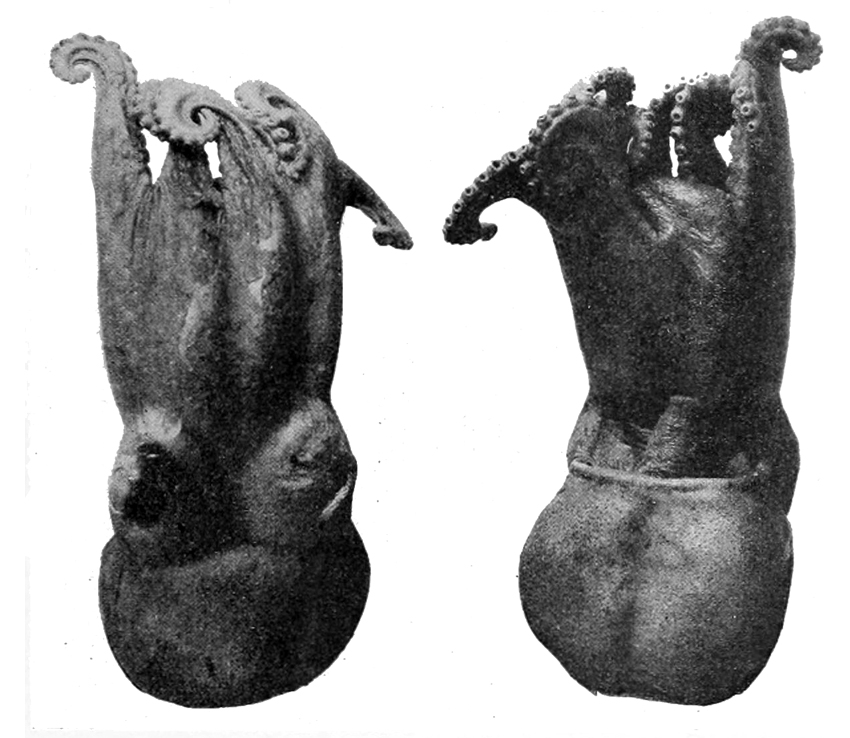

Conservation status
- Least Concern (IUCN 3.1)

Scientific classification
- Kingdom: Animalia
- Phylum: Mollusca
- Class: Cephalopoda
- Order: Octopoda
- Family: Megaleledonidae
- Genus: Pareledone
- Species: P. turqueti

Binomial name
- Pareledone turqueti (Joubin, 1905)

Synonyms
- Eledone turqueti Joubin, 1905; Moschites turqueti Massy, 1916; Graneledone turqueti Joubin, 1924

= Turquet's octopus =

Species of octopus

Turquet's octopus (Pareledone turqueti) is a species of benthic octopus with a circumpolar Antarctic distribution. The species has a wide depth range, occurring from shallow waters to 4,000 m deep.

P. turqueti grows to 15 cm in mantle length. It is characterised by the absence of a skin ridge round the body, and its nearly smooth skin, which is covered with low granular bumps.

In the wild, P. turqueti is known to be preyed upon by Patagonian toothfish off South Georgia and Weddell seals off the South Shetland Islands.

The type specimen was collected in the Antarctic Ocean (65°S, 64°W) and is deposited at the Muséum National d'Histoire Naturelle in Paris.

The species emerged four million years ago and has a twelve-year lifespan. Since these facts are known to science, the species was ideal target for a study on the history of Antarctica. The study found that distinct populations of the species in the Weddell Sea, the Amundsen Sea, and the Ross Sea had interbred 125,000 years ago. This implies that the West Antarctic Ice Sheet had melted during the last interglacial period, which corresponds to Marine Isotope Stage 5. This implies that the West Antarctic Ice Sheet is close to collapse due to the impacts of climate change.
