= Graneledone taniwha =

Conservation status
- Least Concern (IUCN 3.1)

Scientific classification
- Kingdom: Animalia
- Phylum: Mollusca
- Class: Cephalopoda
- Order: Octopoda
- Family: Megaleledonidae
- Genus: Graneledone
- Species: G. taniwha

Binomial name
- Graneledone taniwha O'Shea, 1999

Species of octopus endemic to New Zealand

Graneledone taniwha, the deepwater warty octopus, is a deep-sea species of benthic octopus in the genus Graneledone. This is also one of two species of Graneledone endemic to New Zealand. Graneledone taniwha lives in marine environments. One photographed specimen was found at 900 m (3,000 ft) depth on the Chatham Rise.

== Classification ==
The genus was described by New Zealand marine biologist Steve O'Shea in NIWA Biodiversity Memoir 112, titled The marine fauna of New Zealand: Octopoda (Mollusca: Cephalopoda). O'Shea writes that the differentiation of species of Grandeledone is difficult due to the similarities of characteristics such as arm length and arm-sucker count. In his review of New Zealand octopoda, he expressed the necessity of examination of all named species.

There are two subspecies, Graneledone taniwha kubodera and Graneledone taniwha taniwha, the second of which is not accepted by the World Register of Marine Species, but others found the two to be sister taxa through a molecular phylogeny study. The study argues that "the finding of reciprocal monophyly and species delimitation analyses suggested that the subspecies G. taniwha taniwha and G. taniwha kubodera are different species".

=== Description ===
Graneledone taniwha taniwha is described as "uniformly rose pink to light red with small darker-red chromatophores."

Graneledone taniwha kubodera is described as "moderate to large-sized animal" with large eyes and slender arms.

== Etymology ==
Graneledone taniwha taniwha is named after the taniwha, a supernatural creature from Māori tradition.

Graneledone taniwha kubodera is named after Japanese zoologist Tsunemi Kubodera for his contribution to studies on Graneledone.
