= Microeledone =

Scientific classification
- Kingdom: Animalia
- Phylum: Mollusca
- Class: Cephalopoda
- Order: Octopoda
- Family: Megaleledonidae
- Genus: Microeledone; Norman, Hochberg & Boucher-Rodoni, 2004

Type species
- Microeledone mangoldi Norman, Hochberg & Boucher-Rodoni, 2004

Other species
- Microeledone galapagensis Voight et al., 2026

Genus of mollusc

Microeledone is a genus of octopus from the family Megaleledonidae characterized by ventrally-pigmented, smooth skin, large funnel organ, unique radula, and lack of ink sacs, anal flaps, and crop diverticulum.

Described in 2004, the genus contains, as of May 2026, two species: Microeledone mangoldi and Microeledone galapagensis. Microeledone mangoldi is the type species. Its type specimen was a male collected from a depth of approximately 1,000 m (3,300 ft) near the Norfolk Ridge, in the southwest Pacific Ocean near New Caledonia. Microeledone galapagensis was described in 2026, and its type specimen is a female collected off the coast of Darwin Island of the Galápagos from a depth of 1,773 m (5,817 ft).
