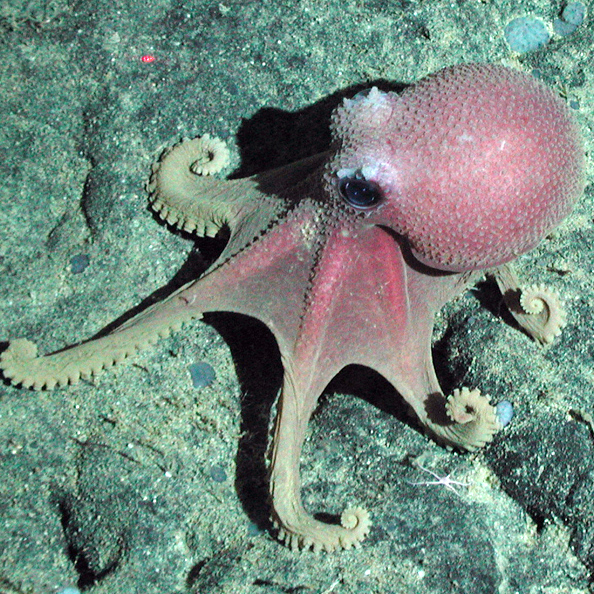
- Graneledone boreopacifica

Scientific classification
- Kingdom: Animalia
- Phylum: Mollusca
- Class: Cephalopoda
- Order: Octopoda
- Family: Megaleledonidae
- Genus: Graneledone; Joubin, 1918

Type species
- Moschites challengeri Berry, 1916

Species
- See text.

= Graneledone =

Genus of molluscs

Graneledone is a genus of octopuses in the family Octopodidae. The type species is Eledone verrucosa Verrill, 1881.

== Species ==
Species and subspecies within the genus Graneledone include:

- Graneledone antarctica Voss, 1976
- Graneledone boreopacifica Nesis, 1982
- Graneledone challengeri (Berry, 1916)
- Graneledone gonzalezi Guerra, González & Cherel, 2000
- Graneledone kubodera O'Shea, 1999
- Graneledone macrotyla Voss, 1976
- Graneledone taniwha O'Shea, 1999
  - Graneledone taniwha kubodera
  - Graneledone taniwha taniwha
- Graneledone verrucosa (A. E. Verrill, 1881)
  - Graneledone verrucosa media *
  - Graneledone verrucosa verrucosa
- Graneledone yamana Guerrero-Kommritz, 2000

Synonyms:

- Graneledone pacifica Voss & Pearcy, 1990: synonym of Graneledone boreopacifica Nesis, 1982
- Graneledone polymorpha Robson, 1930: synonym of Adelieledone polymorpha (Robson, 1930) (original combination)
- Graneledone setebos Robson, 1932: synonym of Megaleledone setebos (Robson, 1932) (original combination)

The species listed above with an asterisk (*) are questionable and need further study to determine if they are valid species or synonyms.
