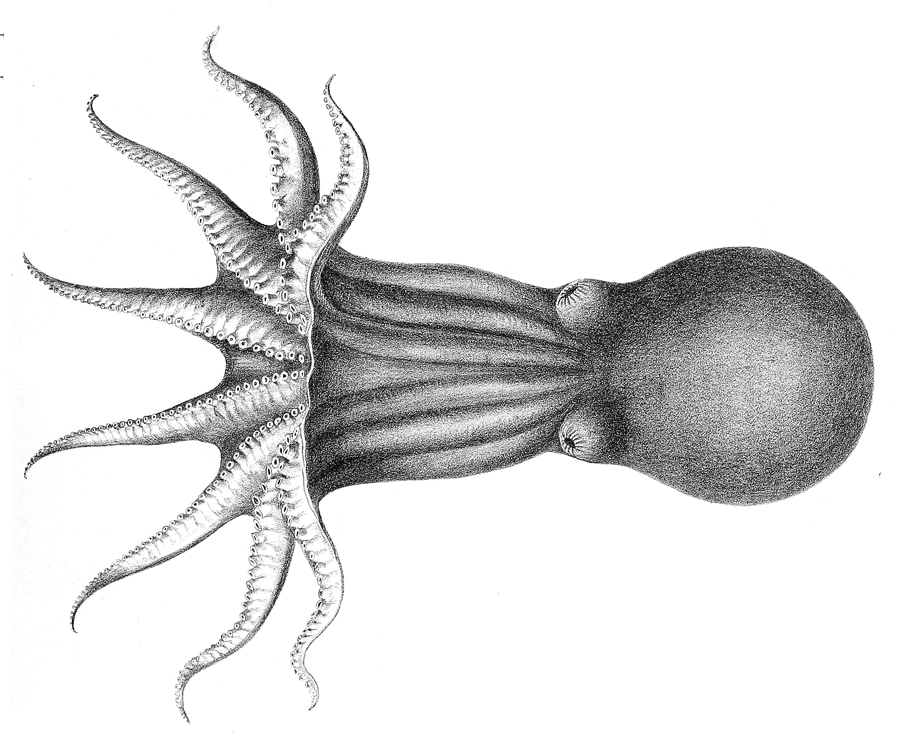
- Bentheledone rotunda

Scientific classification
- Kingdom: Animalia
- Phylum: Mollusca
- Class: Cephalopoda
- Order: Octopoda
- Family: Megaleledonidae
- Genus: Bentheledone; Robson, 1932

Species
- See text.

= Bentheledone =

Genus of molluscs

Bentheledone is a genus of octopuses in the family Megaleledonidae.

== Species ==
- Bentheledone albida * (Berry, 1917)
- Bentheledone rotunda (Hoyle, 1885)

The species listed above with an asterisk (*) are questionable and need further study to determine if they are valid species or synonyms.

== Habitat ==
B. rotunda lives throughout the Antarctic Ocean. Little is known about B. albida; further research has to be done.
