= Microeledone mangoldi =

Conservation status
- Data Deficient (IUCN 3.1)

Scientific classification
- Kingdom: Animalia
- Phylum: Mollusca
- Class: Cephalopoda
- Order: Octopoda
- Family: Megaleledonidae
- Genus: Microeledone; Norman, Hochberg & Boucher-Rodoni, 2004
- Species: M. mangoldi

Binomial name
- Microeledone mangoldi Norman, Hochberg & Boucher-Rodoni, 2004

Species of octopus

Microeledone mangoldi, the sickle-tooth pygmy octopus, is a species of octopus from the genus described in 2004. The type specimen was a male collected from a depth of approximately 1,000 m (3,300 ft) near the Norfolk Ridge, in the southwest Pacific Ocean near New Caledonia. It is a very small octopus which has a single row of suckers, lacks an ink sac and has a radula with seven rows of teeth with the unique central tooth, called the rechidian tooth, being curved with a grooved tip. The remaining teeth are flat and plate like and so are also distinctive. The smooth creamy-pink body lacks any chromatophores. The specific name honours the Swiss malacologist and marine biologist Katharina Mangold-Wirz (1922–2003).
