= Tetracheledone =

Conservation status
- Data Deficient (IUCN 3.1)

Scientific classification
- Kingdom: Animalia
- Phylum: Mollusca
- Class: Cephalopoda
- Order: Octopoda
- Family: Megaleledonidae
- Genus: Tetracheledone; Voss, 1955
- Species: T. spinicirrhus

Binomial name
- Tetracheledone spinicirrhus Voss, 1955

Genus of molluscs

Tetracheledone spinicirrhus, the spiny-horn octopus, is a species of benthic octopus it is the only species in the monotypic genus Tetracheledone which is classified in the family Megaleledonidae. It is found in the tropical western North Atlantic Ocean and in the Caribbean Sea and Gulf of Mexico. It has a mantle length of 10 cm and it can be found in areas with a substrate of sand and mud, at depths of between 200 m and 400 m. It has quite long arms with a single row of suckers and a wide web connecting the arms with two large warty horns over the eyes. The mantle is globular and the mantle, head, arms and web are densely covered with large stellate tubercules.
