= West Antarctic Ice Sheet =

Segment of Antarctic ice sheet

Coordinates: 78°44′03″S 133°16′41″W

- Interactive map of West Antarctic Ice Sheet
- Type: Ice sheet
- Area: 1,970,000 km^{2} (760,000 mi^{2})
- Thickness: ~1.05 km (0.7 mi) (average), ~2 km (1.2 mi) (maximum)
- Status: Receding

The West Antarctic Ice Sheet (WAIS) is the sector of the Antarctic Ice Sheet covering West Antarctica. The WAIS is a marine ice sheet, as the majority of its ice is grounded well below sea level, on rock and sediment that would be the ocean floor if the ice were to retreat. The ice sheet first formed about 27 million years ago, likely fed partially by advancing glaciers of the older East Antarctic Ice Sheet . The WAIS is bounded by the Ross Ice Shelf, the Ronne Ice Shelf, and outlet glaciers that drain into the Amundsen Sea.

As a smaller part of Antarctica, WAIS is also more strongly affected by climate change. There has been warming over the ice sheet since the 1950s, and a substantial retreat of its coastal glaciers since at least the 1990s. Estimates suggest it added around 7.6 ± 3.9 mm (0.30 ± 0.15 in) to the global sea level rise between 1992 and 2017, and has been losing ice in the 2010s at a rate equivalent to 0.4 millimetres (0.016 inches) of annual sea level rise. While some of its losses are offset by the growth of the East Antarctic Ice Sheet, Antarctica as a whole will most likely lose enough ice by 2100 to add 11 cm (4.3 in) to sea levels. Further, marine ice sheet instability may increase this amount by tens of centimeters, particularly under high warming. Fresh meltwater from WAIS also contributes to ocean stratification and dilutes the formation of salty Antarctic bottom water, which destabilizes Southern Ocean overturning circulation.

In the long term, the West Antarctic Ice Sheet is likely to disappear due to the warming which has already occurred. Paleoclimate evidence suggests that this has already happened during the Eemian period, when the global temperatures were similar to the early 21st century. It is believed that the loss of the ice sheet would take place between 2,000 and 13,000 years in the future, although several centuries of high emissions may shorten this to 500 years. 3.3 m (10 ft 10 in) of sea level rise would occur if the ice sheet collapses but leaves ice caps on the mountains behind. Total sea level rise from West Antarctica increases to 4.3 m (14 ft 1 in) if they melt as well, but this would require a higher level of warming. Isostatic rebound of ice-free land may also add around 1 m (3 ft 3 in) to the global sea levels over another 1,000 years.

The preservation of WAIS may require a persistent reduction of global temperatures to 1 °C (1.8 °F) below the preindustrial level, or to 2 °C (3.6 °F) below the temperature of 2020. Because the collapse of the ice sheet would be preceded by the loss of Thwaites Glacier and Pine Island Glacier, some have instead proposed interventions to preserve them. In theory, adding thousands of gigatonnes of artificially created snow could stabilize them, but it would be extraordinarily difficult and may not account for the ongoing acceleration of ocean warming in the area. Others suggest that building obstacles to warm water flows beneath glaciers would be able to delay the disappearance of the ice sheet by many centuries, but it would still require one of the largest civil engineering interventions in history.

== Description ==
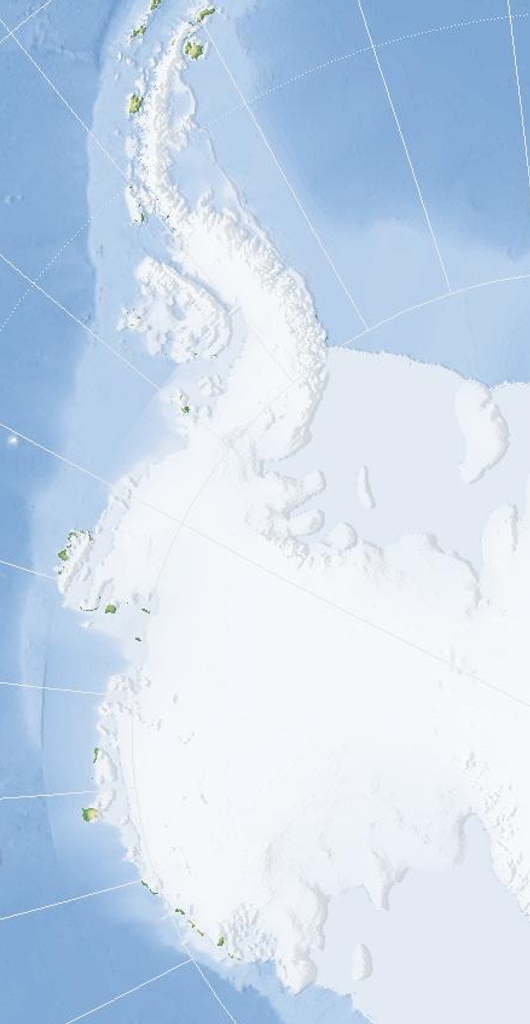
A map of West Antarctica

The total volume of the entire Antarctic ice sheet is estimated at 26.92 million km^{3} (6.46 million cu mi), while the WAIS contains about 2.1 million km^{3} (530,000 cu mi) in ice that is above the sea level, and ~1 million km^{3} (240,000 cu mi) in ice that is below it. The weight of the ice has caused the underlying rock to sink by between 0.5 and 1 kilometre (0.31 and 0.62 miles) in a process known as isostatic depression.

Under the force of its own weight, the ice sheet deforms and flows slowly over rough bedrock. Ice ridges are the areas where ice sheet movement is slow because it is frozen to the bed, while ice streams flow much faster because there is liquid water in the sediments beneath them. Those are either the marine sediments which used to cover the ocean floor before the ice sheet froze above them, or they have been created due to erosion from the constant friction of ice against the bedrock. The water in these sediments stays liquid because the Earth's crust below the ice streams is thin and conducts heat from geothermal activity, and because the friction also generates heat, particularly at the margins between ice streams and ice ridges.

When ice reaches the coast, it either calves or continues to flow outward onto the water. The result is a large, floating ice shelf affixed to the continent. These ice shelves restrain the flow of ice into the ocean for as long as they are present.

=== West Antarctic Rift System ===
The West Antarctic Rift System (WARS) is one of the major active continental rifts on Earth. It is believed to have a major influence on ice flows in West Antarctica. In western Marie Byrd Land, active glaciers flow through fault-bounded valleys (grabens) of the WARS. Sub-ice volcanism has been detected and is known to influence ice flows. In 2017, geologists from Edinburgh University discovered 91 volcanoes located two kilometres below the icy surface, making it the largest volcanic region on Earth.

Fast-moving ice streams in the Siple Coast adjacent to the east edge of the Ross Ice Shelf are influenced by the lubrication provided by water-saturated till within fault-bounded grabens within the rift, which would act to accelerate ice-sheet disintegration at more intense levels of climate change.

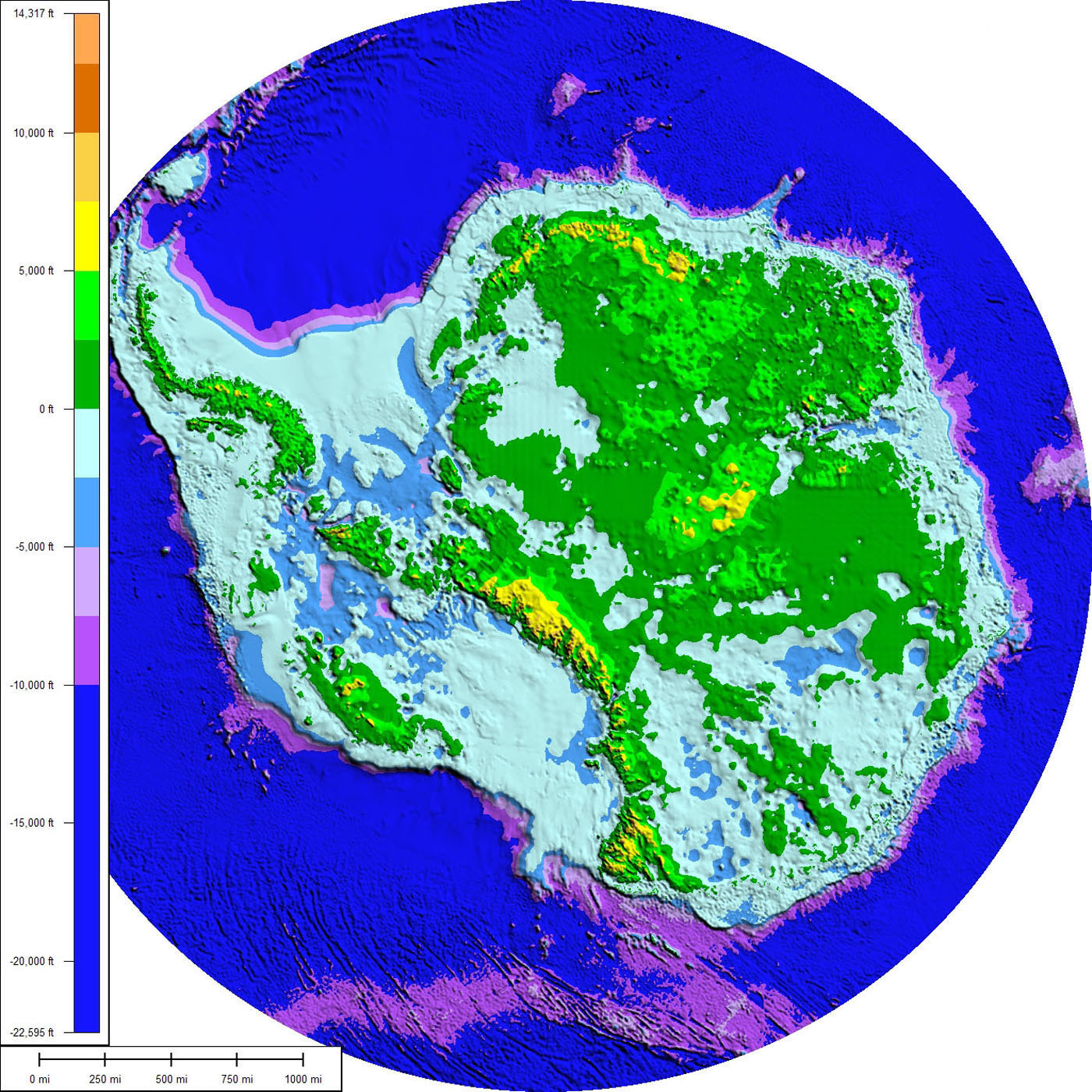
A topographic and bathymetric map of Antarctica without its ice sheets, assuming constant sea levels and no post-glacial rebound

== History ==
Like the other ice sheets, West Antarctic Ice Sheet had undergone significant changes in size during its history. Until around 400,000 years ago, the state of WAIS was largely governed by the effects of solar variation on heat content of the Southern Ocean, and it waxed and waned in accordance with a 41,000-year-long cycle. Around 80,000 years ago, its size was comparable to now, but then it grew substantially larger, until its extent reached the margins of Antarctica's continental shelves during the Last Glacial Maximum ~30,000 years ago. It then shrunk to around its preindustrial state some 3,000 years ago. It also at times shrunk to a point where only minor and isolated ice caps remained, such as during the Marine isotope stage 31 ~1.07 million years ago, or the Eemian period ~130,000 years ago.

== Climate change ==
=== Observations ===
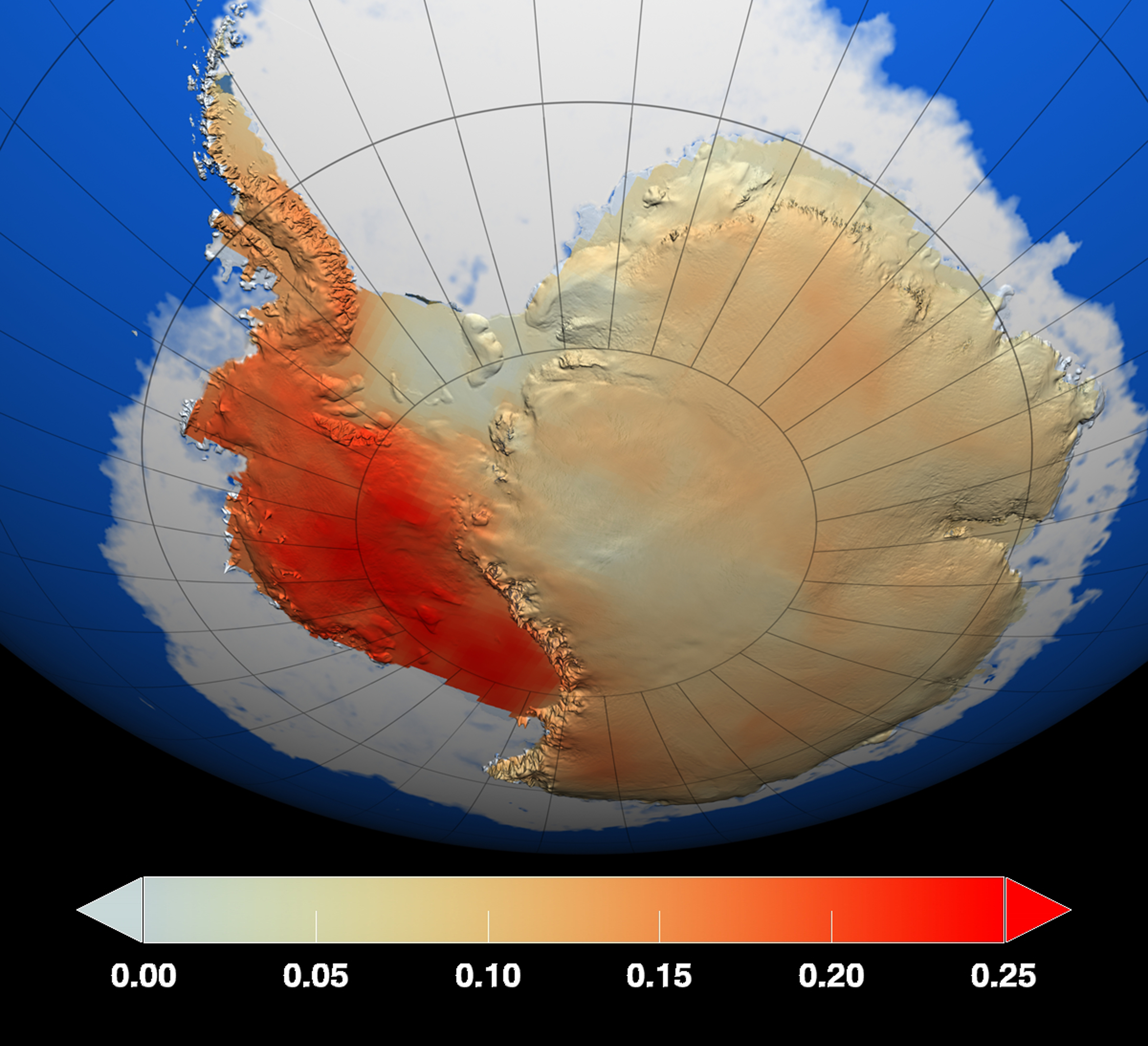
1957–2007 Antarctic surface temperature trends, in °C/decade.

West Antarctica has experienced statistically significant warming in recent decades, although there is some uncertainty about its magnitude. In 2015, the warming of the WAIS between 1976 and 2012 was calculated as a range between 0.08 °C (0.14 °F) per decade and 0.96 °C (1.73 °F) per decade. In 2009, the warming of the region since 1957 was estimated as exceeding 0.1 °C (0.18 °F) per decade. This warming is strongest in the Antarctic Peninsula. In 2012, research found that the West Antarctic ice sheet had warmed by 2.4 °C (4.3 °F) since 1958 – around 0.46 °C (0.83 °F) per decade, which was almost double the 2009 estimate. In 2022, Central WAIS warming between 1959 and 2000 was estimated at 0.31 °C (0.56 °F) per decade, with this change conclusively attributed to increases in greenhouse gas concentrations.

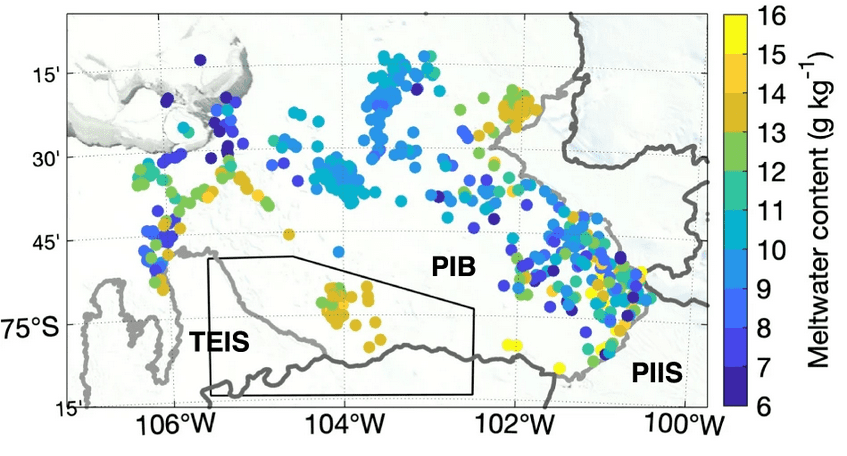
Distribution of meltwater hotspots caused by ice losses in Pine Island Bay, the location of both Thwaites (TEIS refers to Thwaites Eastern Ice Shelf) and Pine Island Glaciers.

The continually increasing ocean heat content forces the melting and retreat of ice sheet's coastal glaciers. Normally, glacier mass balance offsets coastal losses through gains from snowfall at the surface, but between 1996 and 2006, Antarctic ice mass loss had already increased by 75%. Between 2005 and 2010, WAIS melting was thought to have added 0.28 millimetres (0.011 inches) to global sea levels every year. Around 2012, the total mass loss from the West Antarctic Ice Sheet was estimated at 118 ± 9 gigatonnes per year. Subsequent satellite observations revealed that the West Antarctic ice loss increased from 53 ± 29 gigatonnes per year in 1992 to 159 ± 26 gigatonnes per year in 2017, resulting in 7.6 ± 3.9 mm (19/64 ± 5/32 in) of Antarctica sea level rise. By 2023, ~150 gigatonnes per year became the average annual rate of mass loss since 2002, equivalent to 0.4 millimetres (0.016 inches) of annual sea level rise.

Coastal glaciers are typically buttressed by ice shelves, which are massive blocks of floating ice next to a glacier. Yet, the ice shelves melt relatively quickly, as they are constantly in contact with the warming ocean water. Glacier retreat accelerates substantially once they collapse and stop providing structural support to the glacier, and once warm water can flow to the glacier unimpeded. Most ice losses occur at the Amundsen Sea Embayment and its three most vulnerable glaciers – Thwaites Glacier, Pine Island Glacier and Smith Glacier. Around 2005, they were thought to lose 60% more mass than what they have gained, and to contribute about 0.24 millimetres (0.0094 inches) per year to global sea level rise.

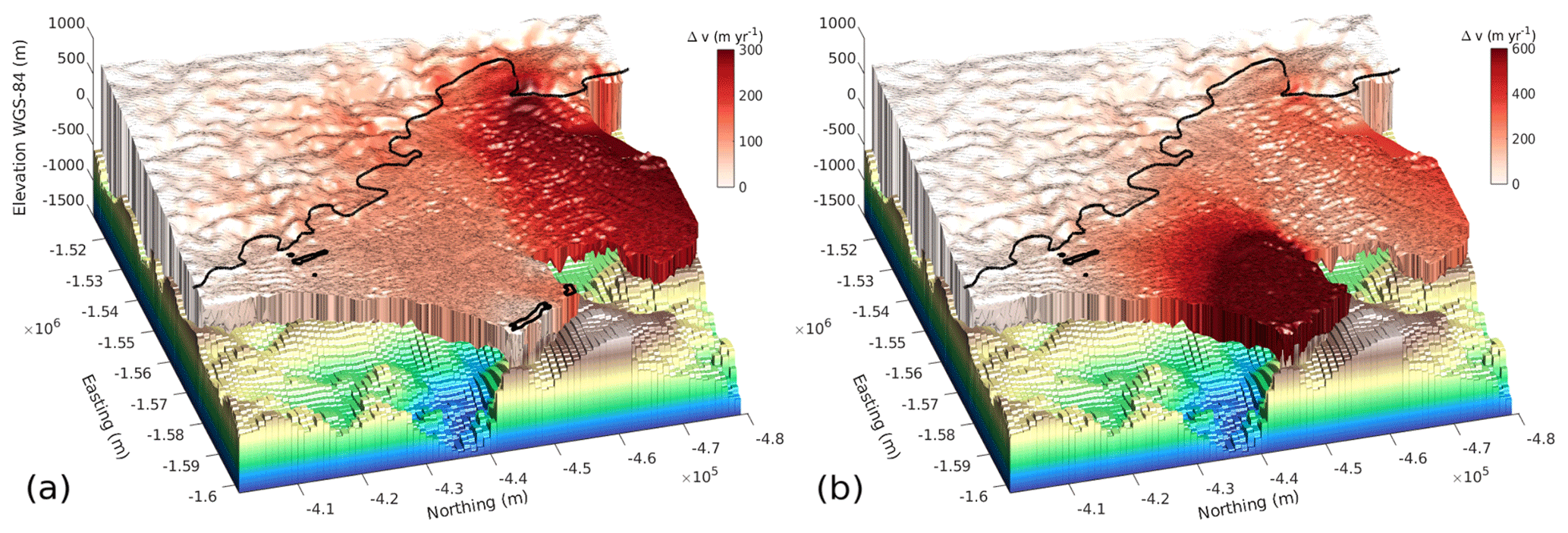
The comparison of current rates of retreat on the eastern side of Thwaites Glacier (left) and ones projected after the collapse of the Thwaites Ice Shelf. This projection was challenged the following year.

Of the three, Thwaites Glacier is the best-known, to the point of being nicknamed the "Doomsday Glacier" by some in the press, although many scientists consider it alarmist and inaccurate. The reason for concern about Thwaites is because it had been experiencing substantial mass loss since at least the early 1990s, while its local seabed topography provides no obstacles to rapid retreat, with its most vulnerable parts located 1.5 mi (2.4 km) below the sea level. Further, it had been shown in 2021 that the Thwaites Ice Shelf, which restrains the eastern portion of the Thwaites Glacier, could start to collapse within five years. The glacier would start to see major losses "within decades" after the ice shelf's failure, and its annual contribution to sea level rise would increase from the current 4% to 5%, although it would still take centuries to disappear entirely.

=== Projected 21st century ice loss ===
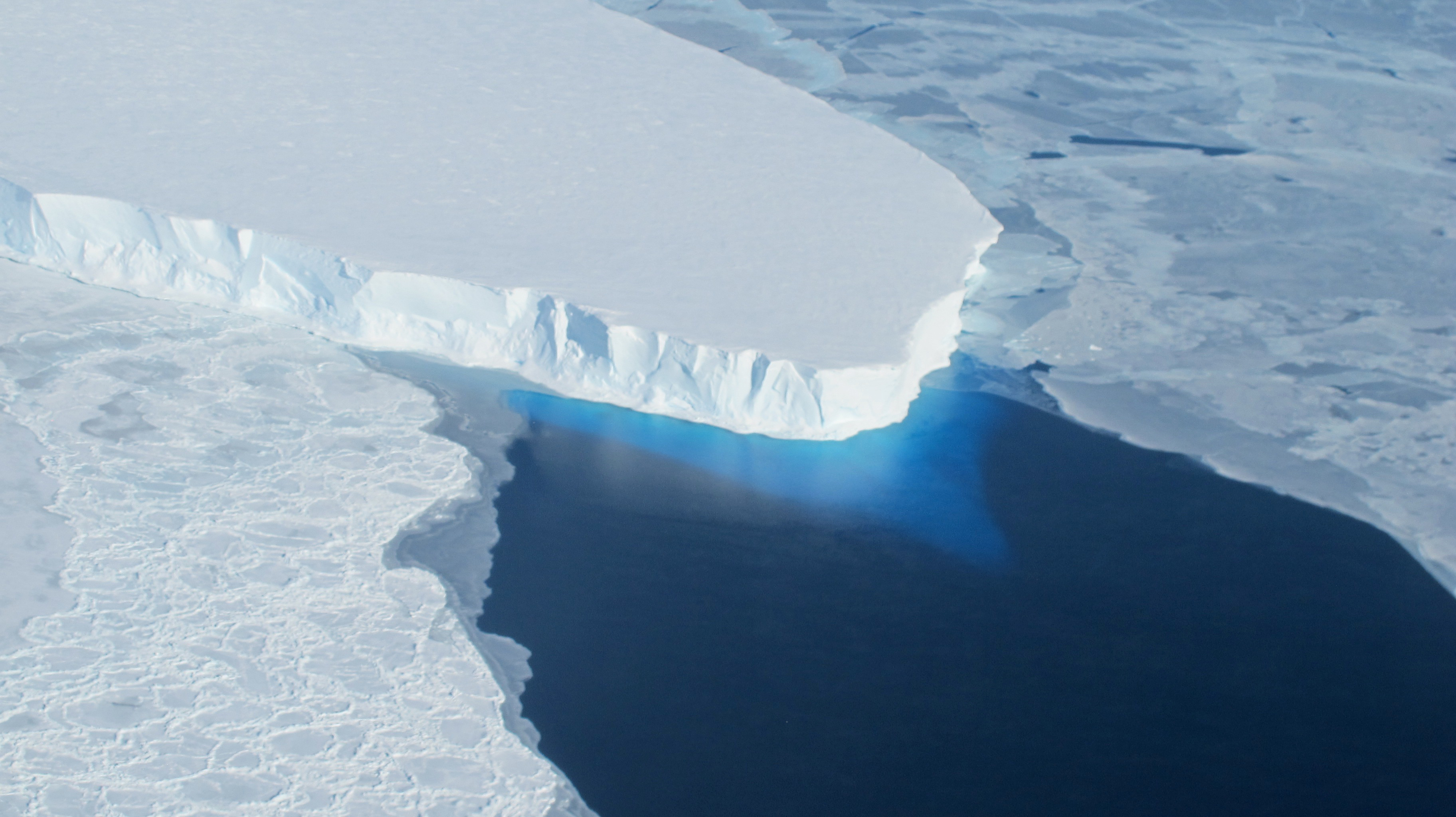
Thwaites Glacier, with its vulnerable bedrock topography visible.

As the West Antarctic Ice Sheet loses ice due to the warming ocean water melting its coastal glaciers, it inevitably contributes to sea level rise. However, projections are complicated by additional processes that are difficult to model, such as meltwater from the ice sheet itself changing local circulation due to being warmer and fresher than the ocean water. Another complicated process is hydrofracturing, where meltwater collecting atop the ice sheet may pool into fractures and force them open, further damaging its integrity. Climate change alters winds above Antarctica, which can also affect surface current circulation, but the importance of this process has been disputed.

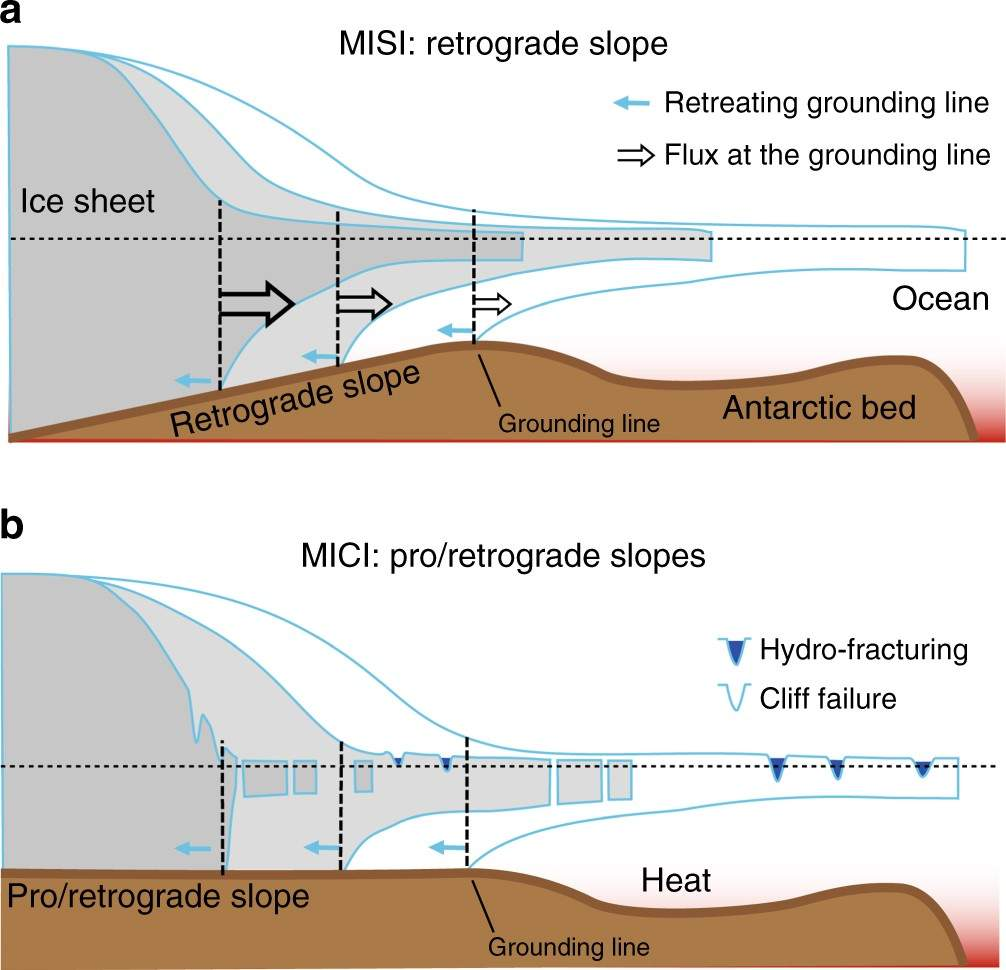
An illustration of the theory behind marine ice sheet and marine ice cliff instabilities.

Most importantly, the WAIS has a complex topography which magnifies its vulnerability. The grounding lines of its glaciers are below the sea level by several hundred metres or more, and the bed only deepens upstream. This means that as the ice sheet loses mass to melting, an increasing fraction of its height becomes exposed to warm water flows that are no longer displaced by its mass. This hypothesis is known as marine ice sheet instability (MISI) and it has the potential to greatly accelerate ice losses. The lack of knowledge about its specifics introduces substantial uncertainty into projections of 21st century sea level rise. WAIS could be even more vulnerable under the so-called marine ice cliff instability hypothesis (MICI). It suggests that when a glacier's ice shelf melts, it would not just retreat faster, but rapidly collapse under its own weight if the height of its cliffs was greater than 100 m (330 ft). This particular process has never been observed and was even ruled out by some of the more detailed modelling, but it still adds to the uncertainty in sea level projections.

The Intergovernmental Panel on Climate Change has wrestled with the limited information about MISI for a long time. In 2001, IPCC Third Assessment Report mentioned the possibility of such disintegration and provided a vague long-term estimate for what it then described as a hypothetical. In 2007, the IPCC Fourth Assessment Report omitted any mention of it due to increased uncertainty, and a number of scientists criticized that decision as excessively conservative. The 2013/2014 IPCC Fifth Assessment Report (AR5) was again unable to describe the risk, but it stated with medium confidence that MISI could add up to several tens of centimeters to 21st century sea level rise. The report projected that in the absence of instability, WAIS would cause around 6 cm (2.4 in) of sea level rise under the low-emission scenario RCP2.6. High emission scenario RCP8.5 would have slightly lower retreat of WAIS at 4 cm (1.6 in), due to calculations that the surface would be gaining mass. This is possible because effects of climate change on the water cycle would add more snow to the surface of the ice sheet, which is soon compressed into more ice, and this could offset some of the losses from the coasts.

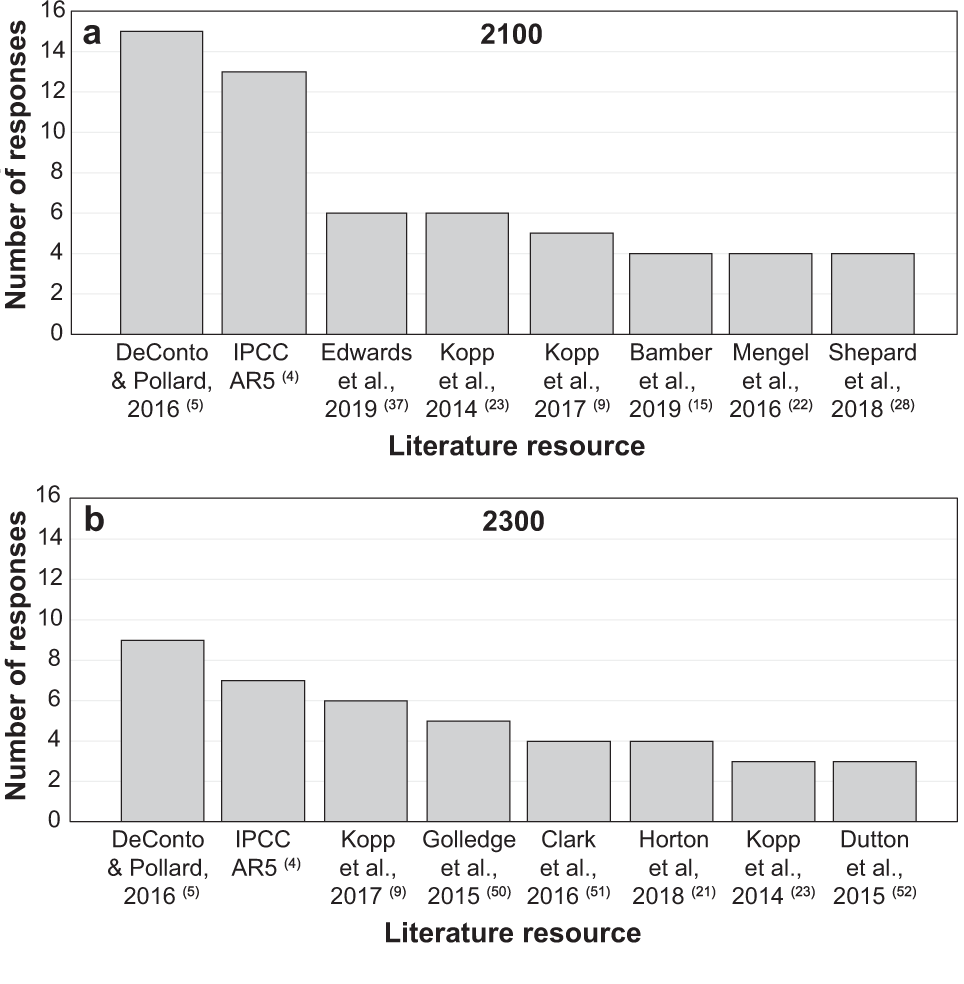
In 2020, experts considered 2016 research on marine ice cliff instability even more influential than the IPCC AR5.

Afterwards, several major publications in the late 2010s (including the Fourth United States National Climate Assessment in 2017) suggested that if instability was triggered, then the overall sea level rise (combining the melting of West Antarctica with that of the Greenland ice sheet and mountain glaciers, as well as the thermal expansion of seawater) from the high-emission climate change scenario could double, potentially exceeding 2 m (5 ft) by 2100 in the worst case. A 2016 study led by Jim Hansen presented a hypothesis of vulnerable ice sheet collapse leading to near-term exponential sea level rise acceleration, with a doubling time of 10, 20 or 40 years, which would then lead to multi-meter sea level rise in 50, 100 or 200 years. However, it remains a minority view amongst the scientific community. For comparison, a 2020 survey of 106 experts found that their 5%–95% confidence interval of 2100 sea level rise for the high-emission scenario RCP8.5 was 45–165 cm (17 1/2–65 in). Their high-level projections also included both ice sheet and ice cliff instability: the experts found ice cliff instability research to be just as, or even more influential, as the IPCC Fifth Assessment report.

If countries cut greenhouse gas emissions significantly (lowest trace), then sea level rise by 2100 can be limited to 0.3–0.6 m (1–2 ft). If the emissions instead accelerate rapidly (top trace), sea levels could rise 5 m (16 1/2 ft) by the year 2300.

Consequently, when the IPCC Sixth Assessment Report (AR6) was published in 2021–2022, it estimated that while the median increase in sea level rise from the West Antarctic ice sheet melt by 2100 would be ~11 cm (5 in) under all emission scenarios (since the increased warming would intensify the water cycle and increase snowfall accumulation over the ice sheet at about the same rate as it would increase ice loss), it can conceivably contribute up to 41 cm (16 in) by 2100 under the low-emission scenario and up to 57 cm (22 in) under the highest-emission one, due to the aforementioned uncertainties. It had also been suggested that by the year 2300, Antarctica's role in sea level rise would only slightly increase from 2100 if the low-emission RCP2.6 scenario was followed, only contributing a median of 16 cm (5 in). On the other hand, even the minimum estimate of West Antarctica melting under the high-emission scenario would be no less than 60 cm (0 ft), while the median would amount to 1.46 m (5 ft) and the maximum to 2.89 m (10 ft).

=== Impacts of melting on ocean currents ===
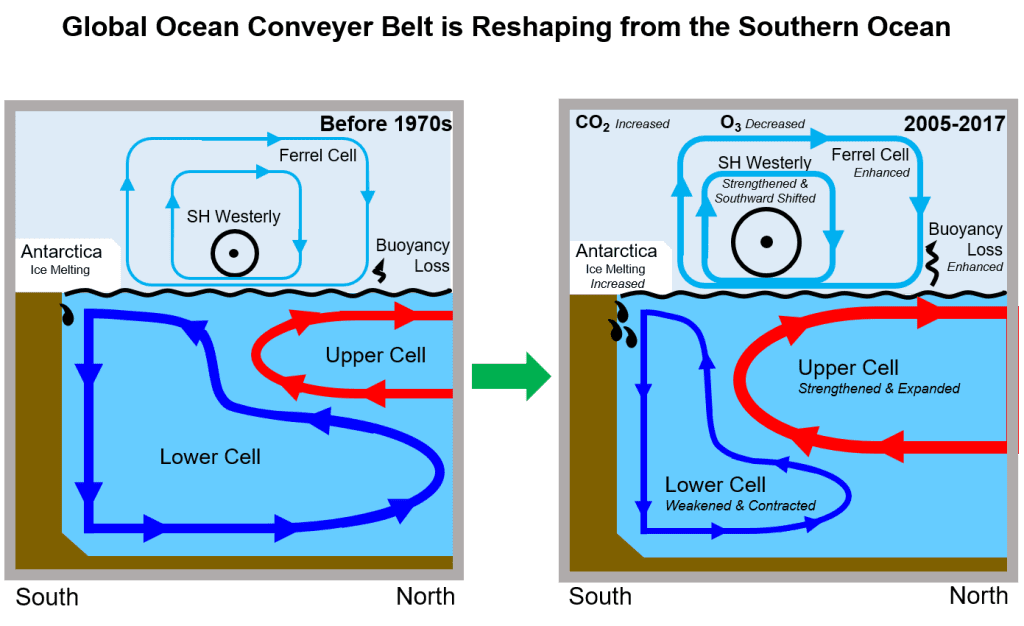
Since the 1970s, the upper cell of the circulation has strengthened, while the lower cell weakened.

Ice loss from the West Antarctic Ice Sheet (along with much smaller losses from the East Antarctic Ice Sheet adds meltwater to the Southern Ocean, at a total rate of 1100–1500 billion tons (GT) per year. This meltwater is fresh, and when it mixes with ocean water, the ocean becomes fresher (less salty) as well. This results in the increased stratification and stabilization of the ocean layers, which has a significant impact on Southern Ocean overturning circulation. It is one half of the global thermohaline circulation, with the better-known Atlantic meridional overturning circulation being the other. Southern Ocean absorbs by far the most heat and is also the strongest carbon sink of any ocean. Both properties are affected by the strength of the overturning circulation.

The overturning circulation consists of two parts – the smaller upper cell, which is most strongly affected by winds and precipitation, and the larger lower cell, which is defined by the temperature and salinity of Antarctic bottom water. Since the 1970s, the upper cell has strengthened by 50–60%, while the lower cell has weakened by 10–20%. Some of this was as the result of the natural cycle of Interdecadal Pacific Oscillation, but large flows of meltwater also had a clear effect, The circulation may lose half of its strength by 2050 under the worst climate change scenario, and decline even more afterwards. In the long run, the circulation could collapse entirely: potentially between 1.7 °C (3.1 °F) and 3 °C (5.4 °F), though this is much less certain than with the other tipping points in the climate system. This collapse would likely require multiple centuries to unfold: it is not expected to diminish Southern Ocean heat and carbon uptake during the 21st century, but is likely to weaken its carbon sink once it is complete, which would be closer to 2300. Other likely impacts include a decline in precipitation in the Southern Hemisphere countries like Australia (with a corresponding increase in the Northern Hemisphere), and an eventual decline of fisheries in the Southern Ocean, which could lead to a potential collapse of certain marine ecosystems. Due to limited research to date, few specifics are currently known.

=== Long-term thinning and collapse ===
A collage of footage and animation to explain the changes that are occurring on the West Antarctic Ice Sheet, narrated by glaciologist Eric Rignot

The same ice sheet topography which makes marine ice sheet instability possible in the short term, also leaves it vulnerable to disappearing in response to even seemingly limited changes in temperature. This suggestion had first been presented in a 1968 paper by glaciologist J. H. Mercer. In the 1970s, radar measurements from research flights revealed that glacier beds in Pine Island Bay slope downwards at an angle, well below the sea level. Thus, even a limited warming of ocean currents ice would effectively undermine the ice. In 1981, the Amundsen Sea region had first been described by the researchers as "the weak underbelly" of the WAIS, with the hypothesis that the collapse of Thwaites Glacier and Pine Island Glacier would trigger the collapse of the entire ice sheet. This had been supported by subsequent research.

Now, the potential for the West Antarctic Ice Sheet to disappear after a certain temperature is exceeded is considered one of the tipping points in the climate system. Earlier research suggested it may withstand up to 3 °C (5.4 °F) before it would melt irreversibly, but 1.5 °C (2.7 °F) was eventually considered a more likely threshold. By 2023, multiple lines of evidence suggested that the real tipping point was around 1 °C (1.8 °F), which has already been reached in the early 21st century. This includes paleoclimate evidence from the Eemian period, such as analysis of silt isotopes in the Bellingshausen Sea, or the genomic history of Antarctica's Turquet's octopus. The former shows specific patterns in silt deposition and the latter genetic connections between currently separate subpopulations; both are impossible unless there was no ice outside of mountain caps in the West Antarctica around 125,000 years ago, during Marine Isotope Stage 5. Since that period was only 0.5 °C (0.90 °F) to 1.5 °C (2.7 °F) warmer than the preindustrial period, the current levels of warming are also likely to be sufficient to eventually melt the ice sheet. Further, oceanographic research explains how this irreversible melting would occur, by indicating that water temperatures in the entire Amundsen Sea are already committed to increase at triple the historical rate throughout the 21st century.

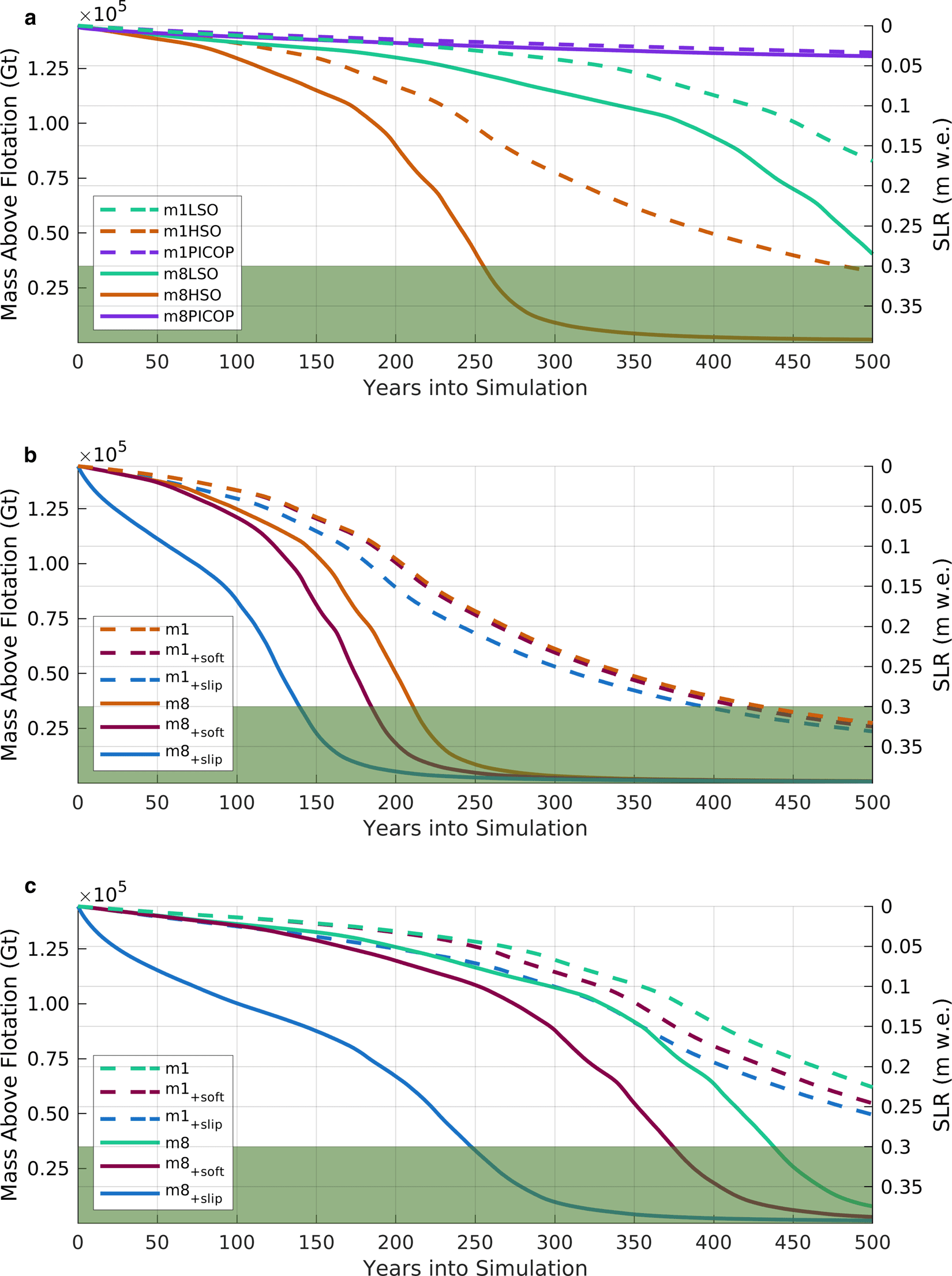
Contribution to sea level rise from a modelled area of Thwaites Glacier under high- and low warming (HSO and LSO) and high (m1) and low (m8) friction. Top shows both warming scenarios in a high-detail model, while middle and bottom graphics show the HSO and LSO scenarios in low-resolution models.

However, while the West Antarctic Ice Sheet is likely to be committed to disappearance, it would take a long time. Its most vulnerable parts like Thwaites Glacier, which holds about 65 cm (25 1/2 in) of sea level rise equivalent, are believed to require "centuries" to collapse entirely. Thwaites' ice loss over the next 30 years would likely be around 5 mm of sea level rise between 2018 and 2050, and between 14 and 42 mm over 100 years. Other research also suggests that Thwaites Glacier would add less than 0.25 mm of global sea level rise per year over the 21st century, although it would increase to over 1 mm per year during its "rapid collapse" phase, which it expected to occur between 200 and 900 years in the future. 2023 research had also shown that much of the glacier may survive 500 years into the future.

Consequently, the entire WAIS would most likely take around 2,000 years to disintegrate entirely once it crosses its tipping point. Under the highest warming scenario RCP8.5, this may be shortened to around 500 years, while the longest potential timescale for its disappearance is around 13,000 years. In 1978, it was believed that the loss of the ice sheet would cause around 5 m (16 ft 5 in) of sea level rise, Later improvements in modelling had shown that the collapse of the ice grounded below the sea level would cause ~3.3 m (10 ft 10 in) of sea level rise, The additional melting of all the ice caps in West Antarctica that are not in contact with water would increase it to 4.3 m (14 ft 1 in). However, those ice caps have been continuously present for at least the past 1.4 million years, and so their melting would require a larger level of warming.

==== Isostatic rebound ====
2021 research indicates that isostatic rebound, after the loss of the main portion of the ice sheet, would ultimately add another 1.02 m (3 ft 4 in) to global sea levels. While this effect would start to increase sea levels before 2100, it would take 1000 years for it to cause 83 cm (2 ft 9 in) of sea level rise – at which point, West Antarctica would be 610 m (2,001 ft 4 in) higher than now. Because the ice sheet is so reflective, its loss would also have some effect on the ice-albedo feedback. A total loss would increase the global temperatures by 0.05 °C (0.090 °F), while the local temperatures would increase by around 1 °C (1.8 °F).

Estimates of isostatic rebound after the loss of East Antarctica's subglacial basins suggest sea level rise contributions of between 8 cm (3.1 in) and 57 cm (1 ft 10 in).

=== Reversing or slowing ice sheet loss ===
While it would take a very long time from start to end for the ice sheet to disappear, some research indicates that the only way to stop its complete meltdown once triggered, is by lowering the global temperature to 1 °C (1.8 °F) below the preindustrial level; i.e. 2 °C (3.6 °F) below the temperature of 2020. Other researchers have proposed engineering interventions to stabilize Thwaites and Pine Island Glaciers before they are lost. For instance, 2019 research estimated that moving some ocean water from the Amundsen Sea to the top of the Thwaites and Pine Island Glacier area and freezing it to create at least 7400 billion tonnes of snow would stabilize the ice sheet. This would be enormously expensive, as an equivalent of 12,000 wind turbines would be required to provide power just to move the water to the ice sheet, even before desalinating it (to avoid enhancing surface melt with salt) and turning it to snow. It also assumed local water temperature remaining at early 21st century levels, rather than tripling unavoidably by 2100 as was discovered by later research.

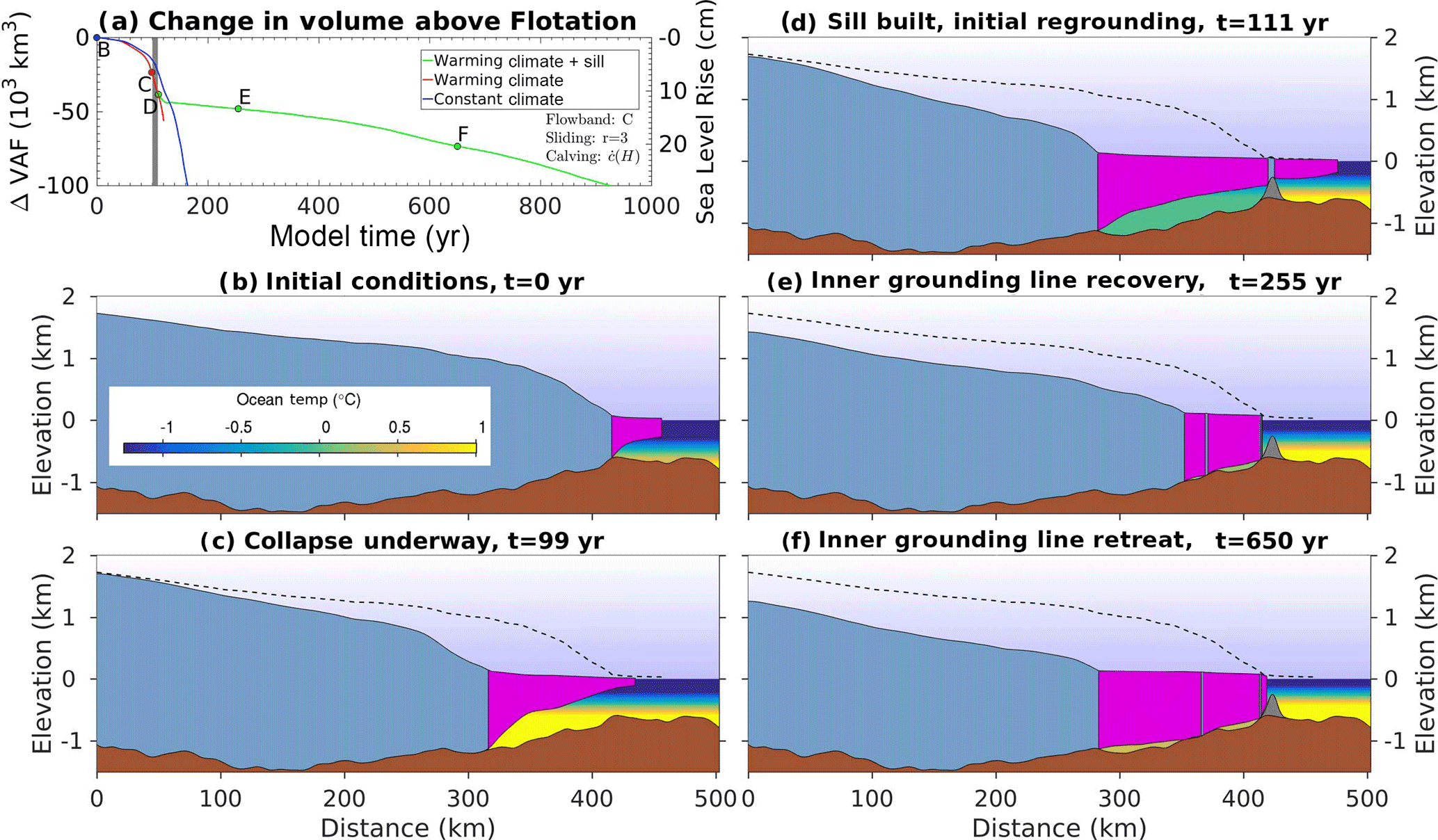
A proposed "underwater sill" blocking 50% of warm water flows heading for the glacier could have the potential to delay its collapse and the resultant sea level rise by many centuries.

Some engineering interventions have been proposed for Thwaites Glacier and the nearby Pine Island Glacier to physically stabilize its ice or to preserve it. These interventions would block the flow of warm ocean water, which currently renders the collapse of these two glaciers practically inevitable even without further warming. A proposal from 2018 included building sills at the Thwaites' grounding line to either physically reinforce it, or to block some fraction of warm water flow. The former would be the simplest intervention, yet equivalent to "the largest civil engineering projects that humanity has ever attempted". It is also only 30% likely to work. Constructions blocking even 50% of the warm water flow are expected to be far more effective, yet far more difficult as well. Some researchers argued that this proposal could be ineffective, or even accelerate sea level rise. The authors of the original proposal suggested attempting this intervention on smaller sites, like the Jakobshavn Glacier in Greenland, as a test. They also acknowledged that this intervention cannot prevent sea level rise from the increased ocean heat content, and would be ineffective in the long run without greenhouse gas emission reductions.

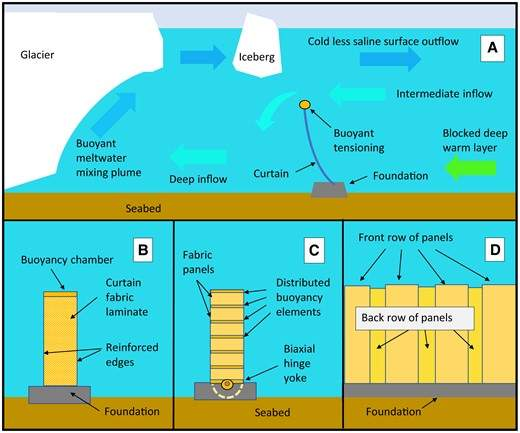
Diagram of a proposed "curtain"

In 2023, it was proposed that an installation of underwater curtains, made of a flexible material and anchored to the Amundsen Sea floor would be able to interrupt warm water flow. This approach would reduce costs and increase the longevity of the material (conservatively estimated at 25 years for curtain elements and up to 100 years for the foundations) relative to more rigid structures. With them in place, Thwaites Ice Shelf and Pine Island Ice Shelf would possibly regrow to a state they last had a century ago, thus stabilizing these glaciers. To achieve this, the curtains would have to be placed at a depth of around 600 m (0.37 mi) (to avoid damage from icebergs which would be regularly drifting above) and be 80 km (50 mi) long. The authors acknowledged that while work on this scale would be unprecedented and face many challenges in the Antarctic (including polar night and the currently insufficient numbers of specialized polar ships and underwater vessels), it would also not require new technology and there is experience of laying pipelines at such depths.

The authors estimated this project would take a decade to construct, at $40–80 billion initial cost, while the ongoing maintenance would cost $1–2 billion a year. Yet, a single seawall capable of protecting the entire New York City may cost twice as much on its own, and the global costs of adaptation to sea level rise caused by the glaciers' collapse are estimated to reach $40 billion annually: The authors also suggested that their proposal would be competitive with the other climate engineering proposals like stratospheric aerosol injection (SAI) or carbon dioxide removal (CDR), as while those would stop a much larger spectrum of climate change impacts, their estimated annual costs range from $7–70 billion for SAI to $160–4,500 billion for CDR powerful enough to help meet the 1.5 °C (2.7 °F) Paris Agreement target.

== See also ==
- East Antarctic Ice Sheet
- List of glaciers in the Antarctic
- Climate change in Antarctica
- WAIS Divide Ice Core Drilling Project
