= Vosseledone =

Conservation status
- Data Deficient (IUCN 3.1)

Scientific classification
- Kingdom: Animalia
- Phylum: Mollusca
- Class: Cephalopoda
- Order: Octopoda
- Family: Megaleledonidae
- Genus: Vosseledone; Palacio, 1978
- Species: V. charrua

Binomial name
- Vosseledone charrua Palacio, 1978

Genus of molluscs

Vosseledone charrua, the Charrua octopus, is a species of octopus, the only species in the monotypic genus Vosselodeone, in the family Megaleledonidae. It was described by Francisco J. Palacio in 1978 from specimens collected off southern South America in the South Atlantic Ocean. It was distinguished from closely related taxa by its well developed ink sac and its degenerate radula. It appears to be restricted to consolidated substrates made up of relict corals.
