= Praealtus =

Conservation status
- Least Concern (IUCN 3.1)

Scientific classification
- Kingdom: Animalia
- Phylum: Mollusca
- Class: Cephalopoda
- Order: Octopoda
- Family: Megaleledonidae
- Genus: Praealtus; Allcock, Collins, Piatkowski & Vecchione, 2004
- Species: P. paralbida

Binomial name
- Praealtus paralbida Allcock, Collins, Piatkowski & Vecchione, 2004

Genus of octopuses

Praealtus paralbida is a species of octopus in the family Megaleledonidae. It is the only known species in the monotypic genus Praealtus. It is very similar to Bentheledone albida, a taxon that is considered a nomen dubium; its true taxonomic status will not be confirmed until more specimens are collected. It reaches a total length of 380mm, with a round mantle and narrow head and medium length arms each with a single row of suckers. Freshly collected specimens are pale slaty grey to almost whitish violet with a dorsal surface covered with abundant small papillae. It is probably found all round the Antarctic but the type specimen was collected off the Antarctic Peninsula. This species is found at depths varying from 2896 to 3222m.
