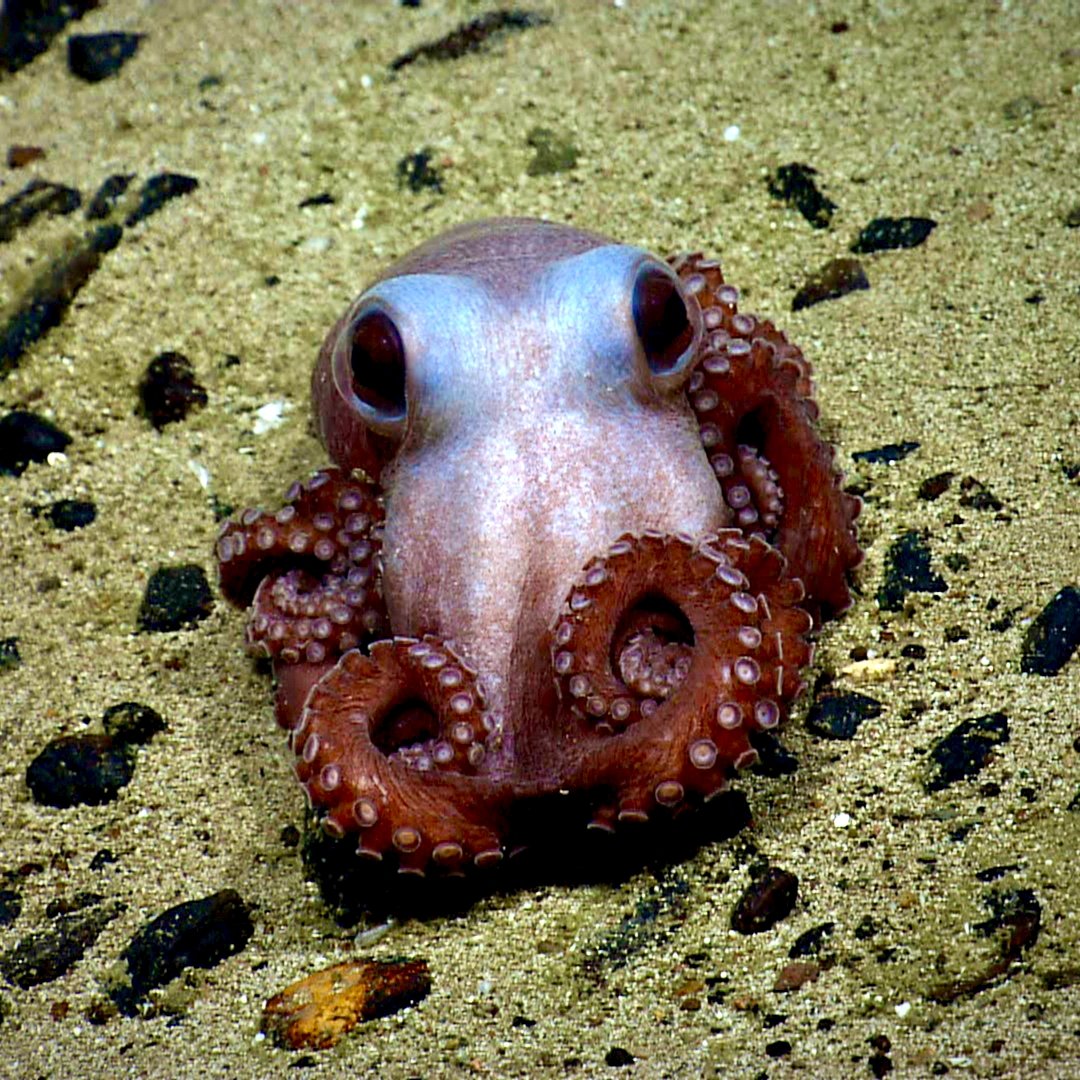
- Adelieledone polymorpha

Scientific classification
- Kingdom: Animalia
- Phylum: Mollusca
- Class: Cephalopoda
- Order: Octopoda
- Family: Megaleledonidae
- Genus: Adelieledone; Allcock, Hochberg, Rodhouse & Thorpe, 2003

Type species
- Moschites adelieana Berry, 1917

Species
- 3 species (see text)

= Adelieledone =

Genus of molluscs

Adelieledone is a genus of octopuses in the family Megaleledonidae.

According to the Census of Marine Life, it may be the closest living relative of the Antarctic ancestor of all octopus species that lived 30 million years ago. Their habitats include; Southern Ocean, Antarctic Ocean, and South Georgia. The most notable feature of adelieledone is the rostral point on the lower beak. It is placed in the family Megaleledonidae by some authorities and in the Octopodidae by others.

== Species ==
There are three recognized species:

- Adelieledone adelieana (Berry, 1917)
- Adelieledone piatkowski Allcock, Hochberg, Rodhouse & Thorpe, 2003
- Adelieledone polymorpha (Robson, 1930) – Antarctic knobbed octopus
