= Bathypurpurata =

Conservation status
- Data Deficient (IUCN 3.1)

Scientific classification
- Kingdom: Animalia
- Phylum: Mollusca
- Class: Cephalopoda
- Order: Octopoda
- Family: Megaleledonidae
- Genus: Bathypurpurata; Vecchione, Allcock & Piatkowski, 2005
- Species: B. profunda

Binomial name
- Bathypurpurata profunda Vecchione, Allcock & Piatkowski, 2005

Genus of molluscs

Bathypurpurata is a genus of incirrate octopus in the family Megaleledonidae from the Antarctic Ocean. The genus has only one species, Bathypurpurata profunda, a small purple octopus which lacks an ink sac and has a single row of suckers and a very large salivary gland. It was described in 2005 from a type specimen caught between the Antarctic Peninsula and the South Shetland Islands.
