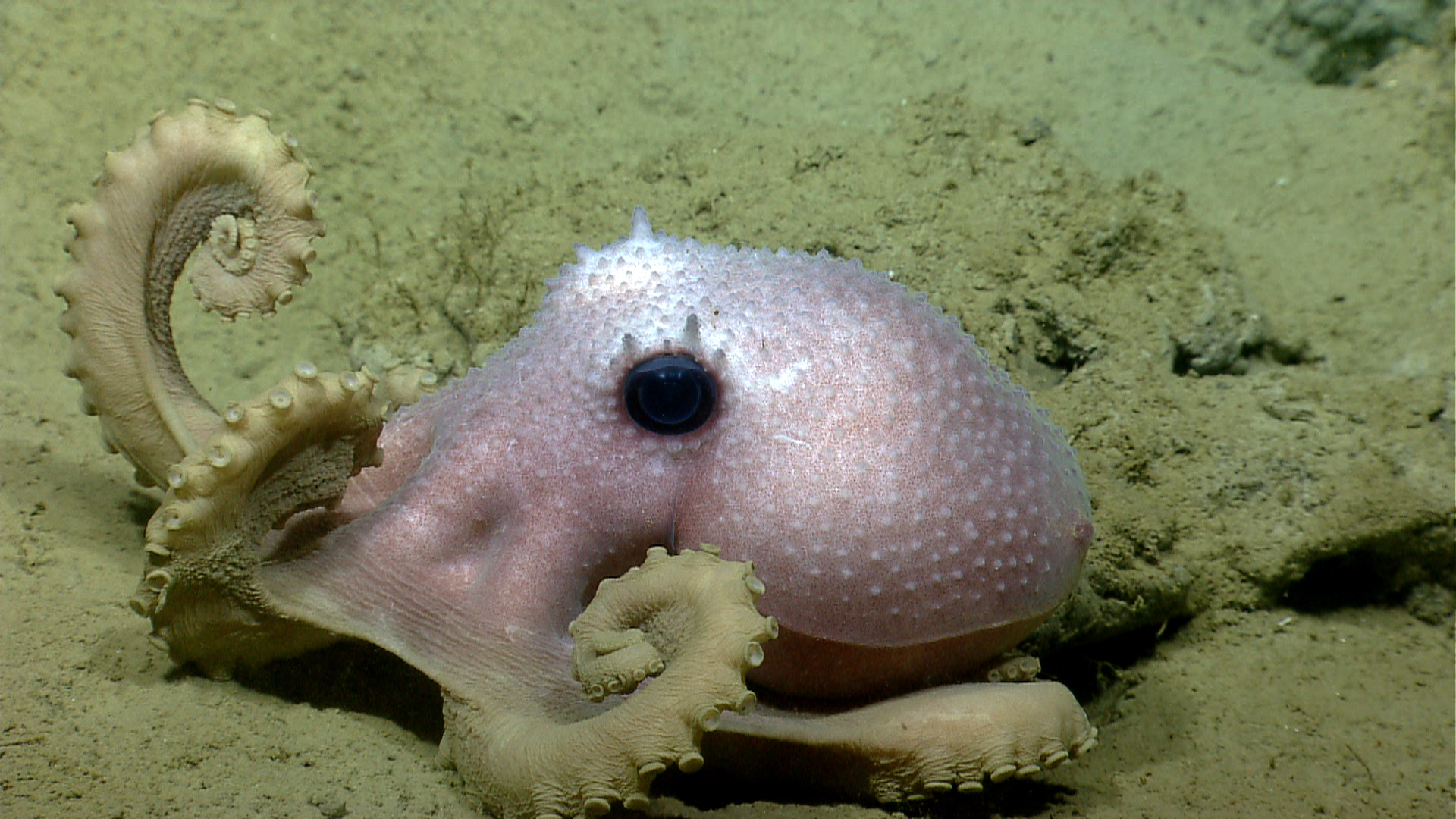

Conservation status
- Least Concern (IUCN 3.1)

Scientific classification
- Kingdom: Animalia
- Phylum: Mollusca
- Class: Cephalopoda
- Order: Octopoda
- Family: Megaleledonidae
- Genus: Graneledone
- Species: G. verrucosa

Binomial name
- Graneledone verrucosa (A. E. Verrill, 1881)

Synonyms
- Eledone verrucosa A. E. Verrill, 1881; Graneledone verrucosa media Joubin, 1918; Graneledone verrucosa verrucosa (A. E. Verrill, 1881); Moschites verrucosa (A. E. Verrill, 1881); Moschites verucosus (A. E. Verrill, 1881); Moschites verucosus var. media Joubin, 1918

= Graneledone verrucosa =

Species of cephalopod

Graneledone verrucosa is a species of octopus in the family Megaleledonidae. The species is native to the North Atlantic Ocean.
