= Thaumeledone =

Scientific classification
- Kingdom: Animalia
- Phylum: Mollusca
- Class: Cephalopoda
- Order: Octopoda
- Family: Megaleledonidae
- Genus: Thaumeledone; Robson, 1930

Type species
- Eledone brevis Hoyle, 1885

Species
- See text

Genus of molluscs

Thaumeledone is a genus of octopuses in the family Octopodidae found in deep waters in the Southern Hemisphere.

== Characteristics ==
Members of this genus are found in deep waters in the Southern Hemisphere. They are small, squat-bodied, benthic octopuses with arms united by a web. A single row of suckers occurs on the arms. Most species have a deep purple pigmentation on the oral surface of the web. One arm in the male is modified into a hectocotylus. This has a large calamus at the end, giving it a club-like appearance.

== Species ==
These species are accepted by the World Register of Marine Species:

- Thaumeledone brevis (Hoyle, 1885) - southwest Atlantic Ocean
- Thaumeledone gunteri Robson, 1930 - Southern Ocean around South Georgia
- Thaumeledone marshalli O'Shea, 1999 - New Zealand and the southwest Pacific Ocean
- Thaumeledone peninsulae Allcock, Collins, Piatkowski & Vecchione, 2004 - Southern Ocean, Antarctic Peninsula
- Thaumeledone rotunda (Hoyle, 1885) - Southern Ocean and circumpolar (This name is considered invalid by the World Register of Marine Species, which prefers Bentheledone rotunda.)
- Thaumeledone zeiss O'Shea, 1999 - New Zealand and the southwest Pacific Ocean
