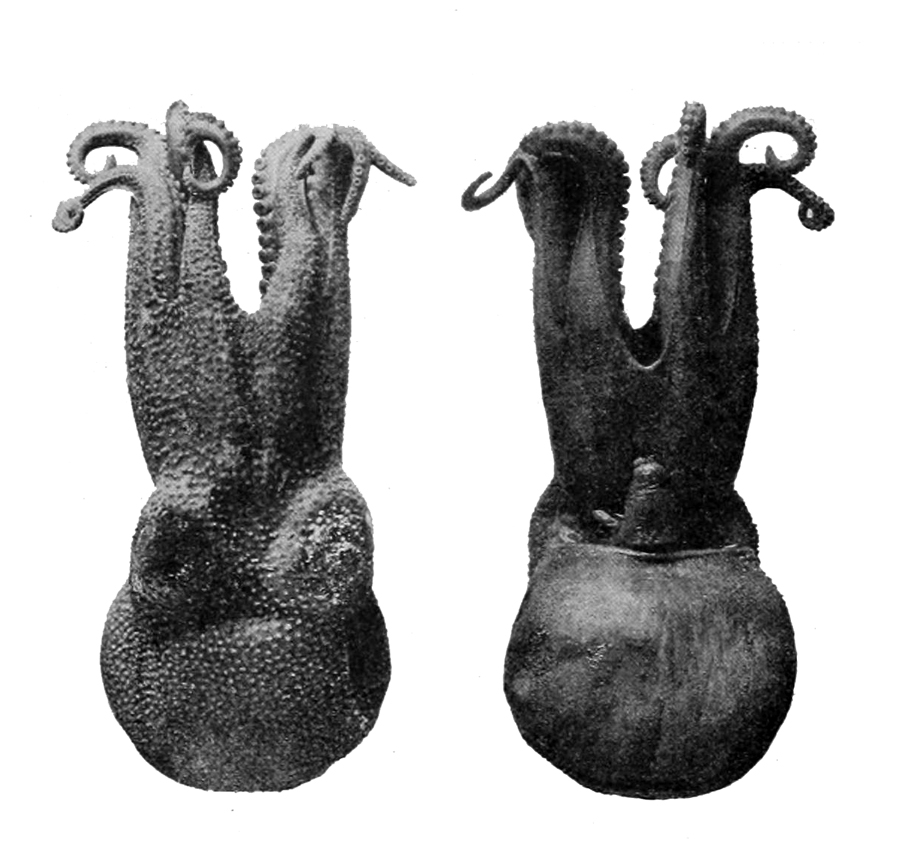
- Pareledone charcoti

Scientific classification
- Kingdom: Animalia
- Phylum: Mollusca
- Class: Cephalopoda
- Order: Octopoda
- Family: Megaleledonidae
- Genus: Pareledone; Robson, 1932

Species
- See text.

= Pareledone =

Genus of molluscs

Pareledone is a genus of octopuses in the family Megaleledonidae.

== Species ==
- Pareledone adelieana (Berry, 1917)
- Pareledone aequipapillae Allcock, 2005
- Pareledone albimaculata Allcock, 2005
- Pareledone antarctica (Thiele, 1920) *
- Pareledone aurata Allcock, 2005
- Pareledone charcoti (Joubin, 1905)
- Pareledone cornuta Allcock, 2005
- Pareledone felix Allcock, Strugnell, Prodohl, Piatkowski & Vecchione, 2007
- Pareledone framensis (Lu & Stranks, 1994)
- Pareledone harrissoni (Berry, 1917)
- Pareledone panchroma Allcock, 2005
- Pareledone polymorpha (Robson, 1930)
- Pareledone prydzensis (Lu & Stranks, 1994 )
- Pareledone serperastrata Allcock, 2005
- Pareledone subtilis Allcock, 2005
- Pareledone turqueti (Joubin, 1905), Turquet's octopus

The species listed above with an asterisk (*) are questionable and need further study to determine if they are valid species or synonyms.

== RNA editing ==
Some octopuses exhibit the ability to alter speeds of sodium and potassium ion movement across cell membranes, allowing them to live in very cold water. Researchers at the University of Puerto Rico's Institute of Neurobiology found that a member of the Pareledone genus collected from McMurdo Station, Antarctica could speed up the gating kinetics of its potassium channels in cold water to keep up with sodium ion exchange, whose channel is less temperature sensitive. This alteration in the rate of opening is accomplished through RNA editing, in which specific deamination of an adenosine nucleotide to inosine results in a change in a single amino acid in the potassium channel's voltage sensor, destabilizing the open state. They are now looking into whether individuals can alter their protein synthesis in response to changing temperatures, or if this change occurs species-wide, over long-term adaptations. If changes are possible by the individual, these octopuses might be able to adapt quickly to changing climate scenarios.
