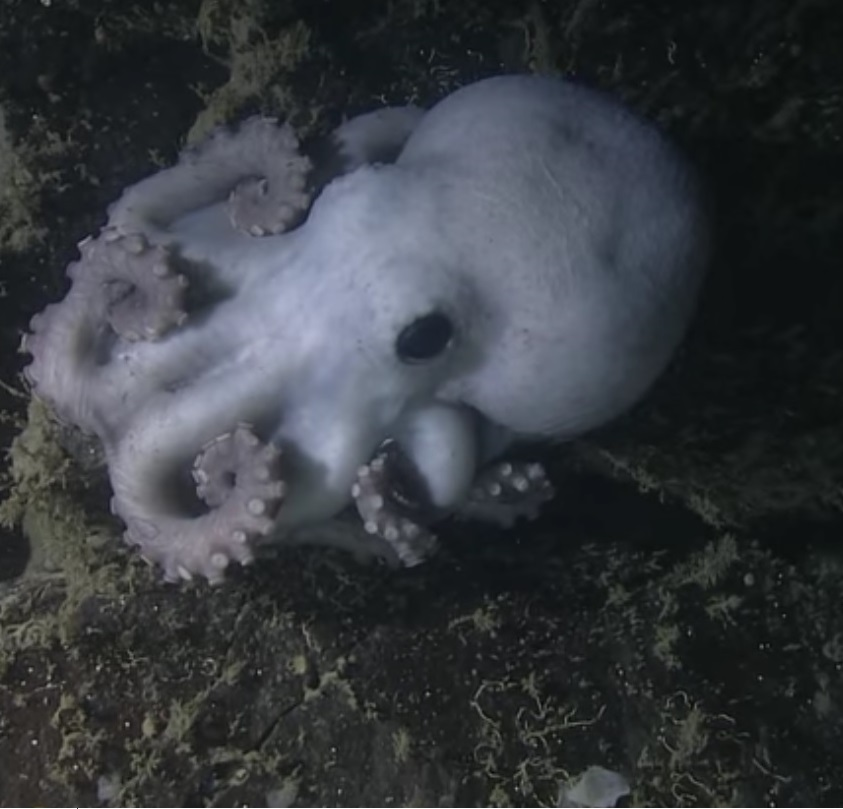
- Graneledone boreopacifica

Scientific classification
- Kingdom: Animalia
- Phylum: Mollusca
- Class: Cephalopoda
- Order: Octopoda
- Superfamily: Octopodoidea
- Family: Megaleledonidae; Taki, 1961

Type genus
- Megaleledone Taki, 1961

= Megaleledonidae =

Family of molluscs

Megaleledonidae is a family of octopuses in the superfamily Octopodoidea. It was formerly placed in the family Octopodidae sensu lato as the subfamily Megaleledoninae but more recent studies have raised this taxon as a valid family. Megaleledonidae contains about 43 species in 12 genera.

== Reproduction ==
Megaleledonidae are known to produce both fewer and larger offspring than octopods that live in more tropical climates. The eggs produced by Megaleledonidae are typically large with very slow embryonic development that can take up the majority of their lifecycle including from months to years.

== Genera ==
The following genera are included within the family Megaleledonidae:

- Adelieledone Allcock, Hochberg, Rodhouse & Thorpe, 2003 (3 species)
- Bathypurpurata Vecchione, Allcock & Piatkowski, 2005 (monotypic)
- Bentheledone Robson, 1932 (2 species)
- Graneledone Joubin, 1918 (9 species)
- Megaleledone Iw. Taki, 1961 (monotypic)
- Microeledone Norman, Hochberg & Boucher-Rodoni, 2004 (2 species)
- Pareledone Robson, 1932 (16 species)
- Praealtus Allcock, Collins, Piatkowski & Vecchione, 2004 (monotypic)
- Tetracheledone Voss, 1955 (monotypic)
- Thaumeledone Robson, 1930 (6 species)
- Velodona Chun, 1915 (monotypic)
- Vosseledone Palacio, 1978 (monotypic)
