= Vitreledonella alberti =

Scientific classification
- Kingdom: Animalia
- Phylum: Mollusca
- Class: Cephalopoda
- Order: Octopoda
- Family: Amphitretidae
- Genus: Vitreledonella
- Species: V. alberti

Binomial name
- Vitreledonella alberti Joubin, 1924

Species of octopus

Vitreledonella alberti is an incirrate octopus, in the genus Vitreledonella of the family Amphitretidae. It was named alberti in honor of Albert I, Prince of Monaco.

== Description ==
It is a transparent octopus. It was discovered by Louis Joubin in 1924, six years after the discovery of its better-known congener Vitreledonella richardi.
