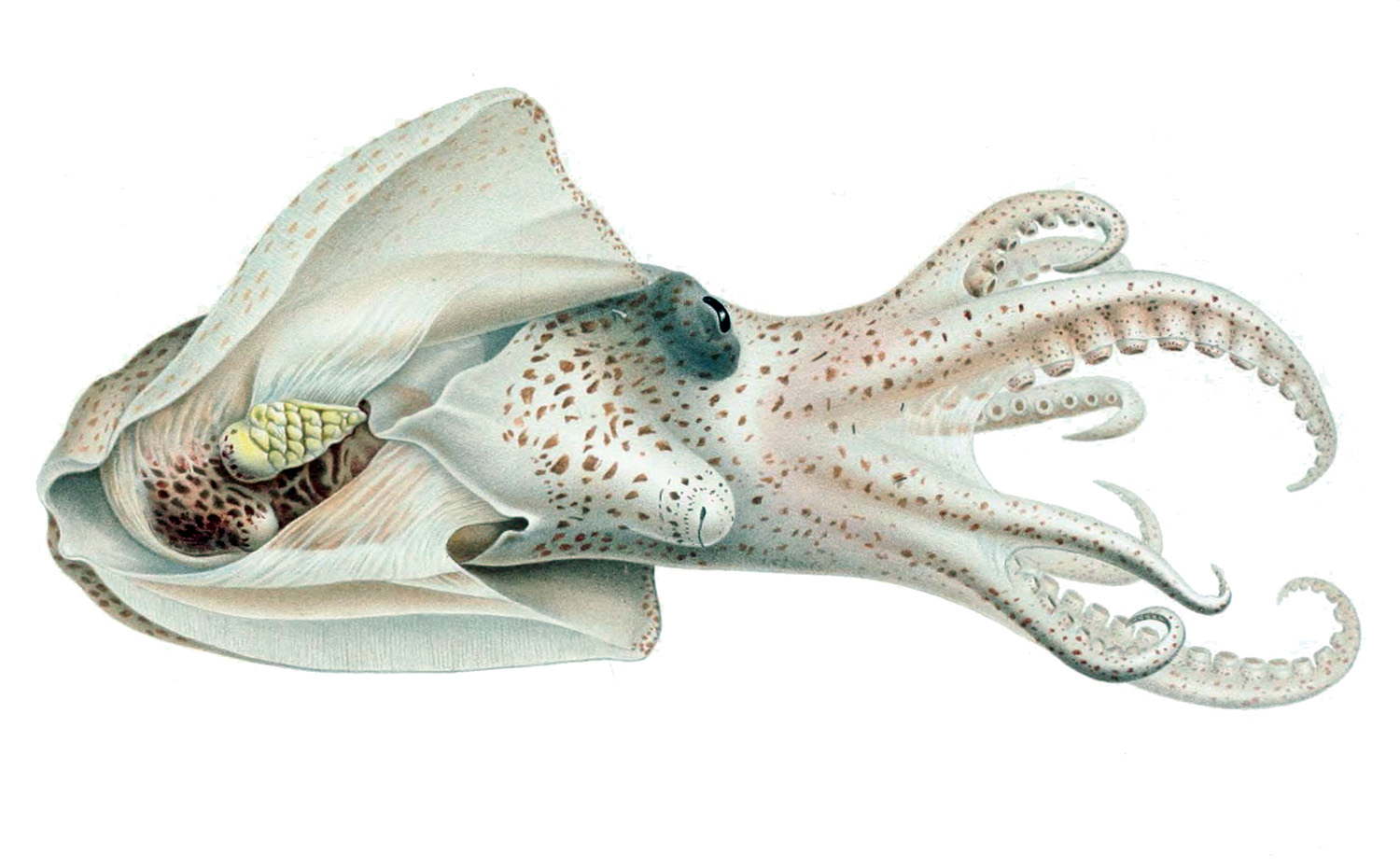
- Illustration from 1910
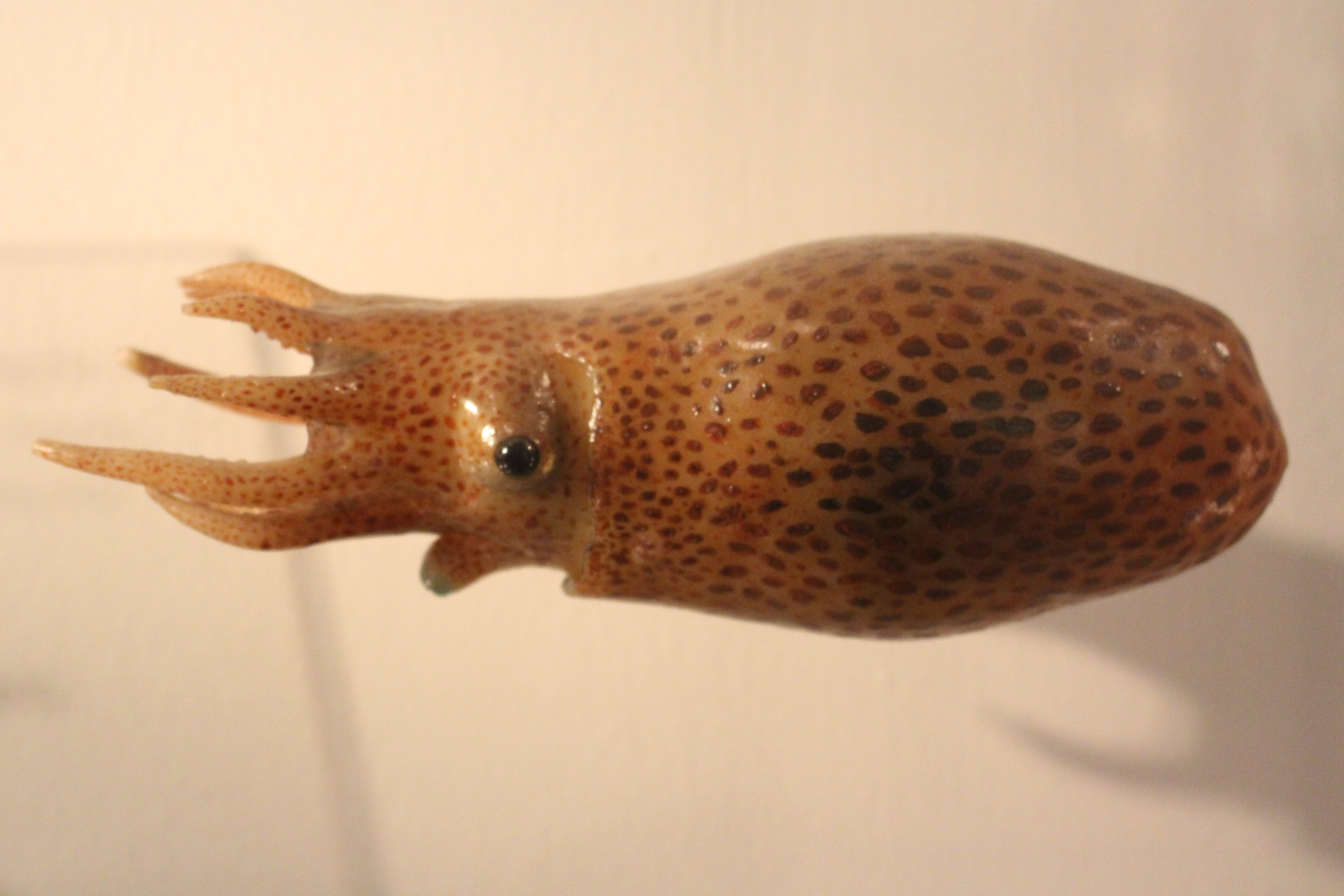
- Model at the Natural History Museum in London, England

Conservation status
- Least Concern (IUCN 3.1)

Scientific classification
- Kingdom: Animalia
- Phylum: Mollusca
- Class: Cephalopoda
- Order: Octopoda
- Family: Amphitretidae
- Genus: Japetella
- Species: J. diaphana

Binomial name
- Japetella diaphana (Hoyle, 1885)

= Japetella diaphana =

Species of deep sea octopus

Japetella diaphana, also known as the midwater octopus, is a species of pelagic deep-sea octopus from the subfamily Bolitaeninae in the family Amphitretidae. It inhabits the mesopelagic and bathypelagic zones of all three major oceans, and is known for its transparent body and bioluminescence. The midwater octopus is also noted for its high tolerance to hypoxia, and is able to live in a wide range of oxygen levels.

== Taxonomy ==
Japatella diaphana belongs to the phylum Mollusca, in the class of Cephalopoda and the subclass Coleoidea. Within Coleoidea, it is part of the order Octopoda in the Incirrata suborder. It belongs to the family Amphitretidae and the subfamily Bolitaeninae.

The genus Japetella, of which Japatella diaphana is the type species, is commonly referred to as the 'midwater octopus'.

== Anatomy and morphology ==
Japetella diaphana is characterized by its small, gelatinous body and distinctive bioluminescence, which play roles in communication and predator avoidance.. Its adaptations, including a luminescent oral ring composed of light-generating photocytes and hypoxic metabolic strategies, are well-suited to deep-sea environments, where visual predator-prey interactions are constrained by light availability.

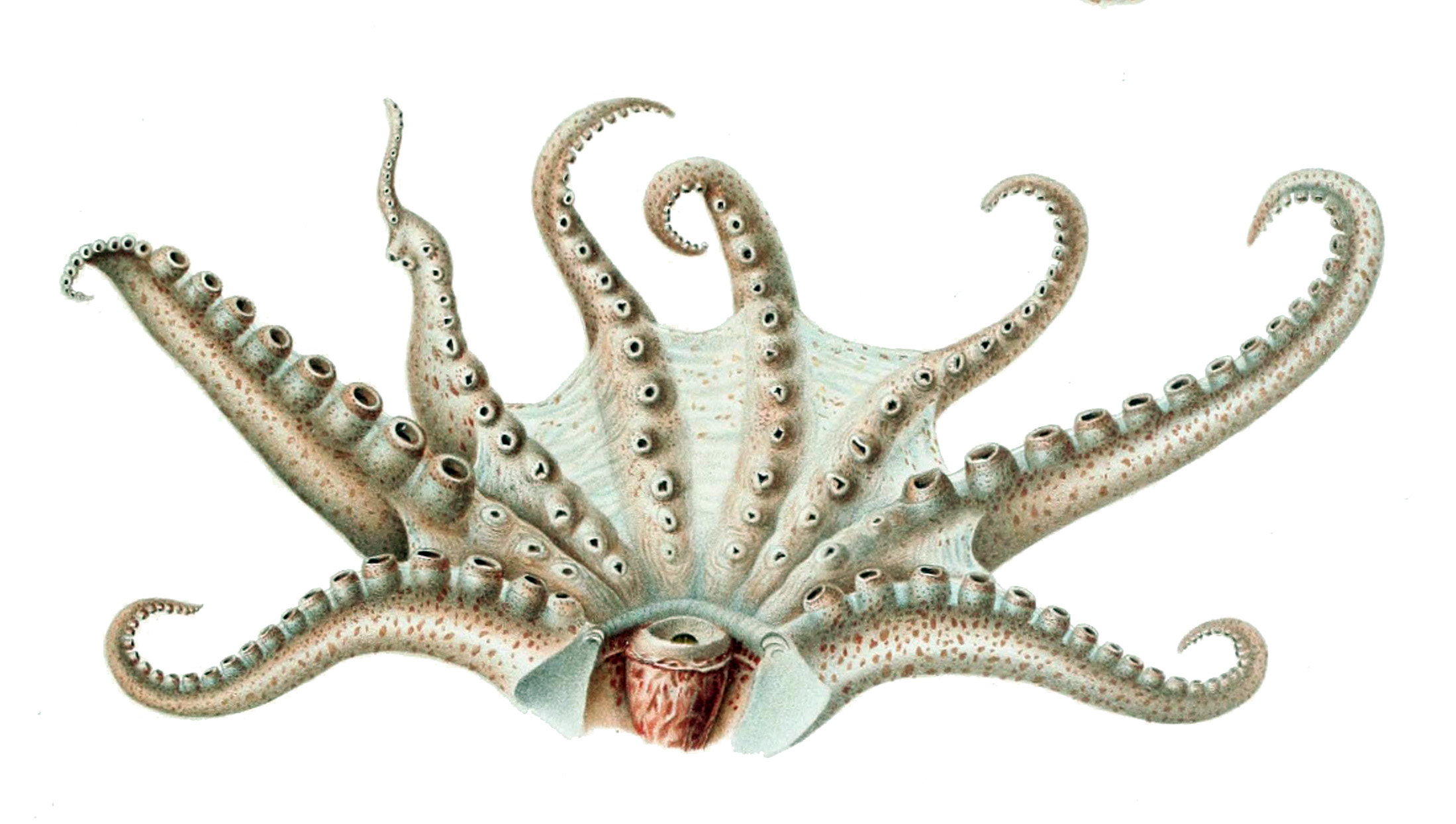
Illustration from 1910 of Japetella diaphana's arms and mouth

Specimens of Japetella diaphana collected from the Pacific Ocean near the Hawaiian Islands have displayed mantle lengths of 35–80 mm (1.4–3.1 in), while mature specimens obtained in the northeast Pacific and central and eastern Atlantic have displayed longer mantle lengths of 53–144 mm (2.1–5.7 in), body masses ranging from 18–235 g (0.63–8.29 oz), and a series of growth increments in their beaks ranging from 21 to 207. Each growth increment takes over 24 hours to form. Japetella diaphana displays a longer-than-average lifespan compared to octopus species living in the neritic zone. The species also exhibits physiological traits and plasticity that allow it to tolerate hypoxic conditions at warmer temperatures, unlike most ectotherms.

== Distribution and habitat ==
Japetella diaphana is found in tropical and subtropical oceans worldwide, including the Atlantic, Pacific, and Indian Oceans. Unlike most octopuses, which are benthic, Japetella diaphana is pelagic, inhabiting both the mesopelagic and bathypelagic oceanic zones. The species is the most widespread deep-sea cephalopod in the Mexican Pacific, and has been sampled in 11 stations off the west coast of Mexico during the TALUD III-XVI-B research cruises. Its presence has also been recorded in the Gulf of California, Monterey Bay (California), the North Atlantic, and near the Cape Verde archipelago. In the Sargasso Sea, it is primarily found in the southern area, where its distribution is influenced by oceanographic features such as temperature gradients and water currents.

Japetella diaphana undergoes diurnal vertical migration (DVM), moving between depths in response to light availability. It is also known for ontogenetic vertical migration, where juveniles start their life at shallower depths (approximately 200 m (660 ft)) and gradually descend to deeper depths as they mature; brooding females are often found at depths exceeding 700–1,000 m (2,300–3,300 ft).

Japetella diaphana is particularly abundant in regions with deep-water oxygen minimum zones (OMZs), including the Eastern Tropical North Pacific (ETNP) off the coast of Mexico and Central America. It is well-adapted to the hypoxic conditions present in these zones. Despite its hypoxia tolerance, the species avoids the most extreme hypoxic zones, instead populating the more oxygenated waters surrounding these areas.

== Diet ==
Japetella diaphana is an opportunistic ambush predator, relying on its translucent body to avoid detection and its bioluminescent characteristics (including a photophore surrounding the mouth of mature females) to lure prey such as zooplankton and small crustaceans. Specimens of Japetella diaphana collected off the west coast of Mexico contained crustacean remains in their stomachs, suggesting a diet composed mainly of copepods and amphipods. Japetella's ability to switch between prey types based on availability may be essential for its survival in resource-scarce environments.

== Reproduction ==
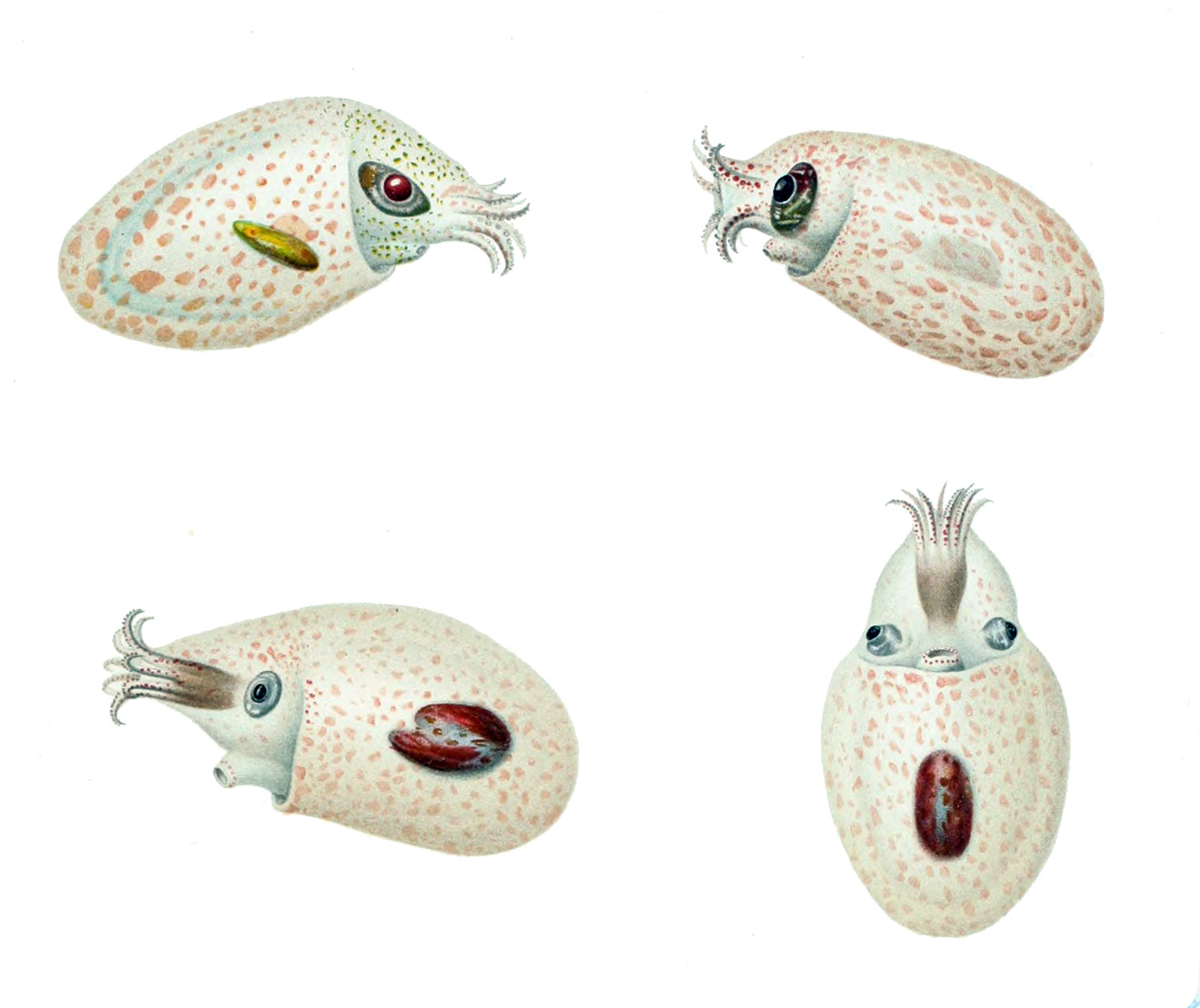
Illustration from 1910 of Japetella diaphana larvae

Japetella diaphana's reproductive strategy is characterized by synchronous ovulation, with mature females spawning approximately 2,000 eggs. A brooding female was found at 1,352 m (4,436 ft) in the Gulf of California carrying 1,419 eggs in the pre-organogenetic stage; each egg had a diameter of approximately 2.5 mm. Immature and maturing females can have as many as 4,000 oocytes, but a significant portion of these cells undergo resorption before reaching full maturity. The octopus broods its eggs within its arm crown, holding them in front of the mouth. This behavior likely restricts the octopus's ability to feed. It is estimated that embryonic development takes about 731 days in cold deep-sea conditions (4.5 °C (40.1 °F).

A large, bioluminescent circumoral photophore is found on mature females. It lies beneath a transparent outer layer, forming a thick ring around the mouth with blood vessels and muscle fibers passing directly through the structure. One female specimen collected near the Hawaiian islands had a yellow photophore measured at 1.5 mm deep by 3 mm wide (0.05 in by 0.12 in). The photopore had short, extended lobes that gave it a flower-like appearance. This organ originates from a muscular ring that undergoes cellular proliferation during the early stages of development, followed by gradual degeneration of the muscle tissue. Its photocytes have a uniform cytoplasm with small mitochondria, granular aggregates, and microtubular or microfibrillar bundles. The organ may play a role in attracting mates, particularly in the low-light environments of the deep sea.

== Threats ==
Japetella diaphana is a host for the protist Hochbergia moroteuthensis, a large unicellular parasite commonly found in midwater cephalopods. Remotely operated vehicles (ROVs) in the Monterey Submarine Canyon have observed the presence of the parasite in 7% of sampled J. diaphana individuals.
