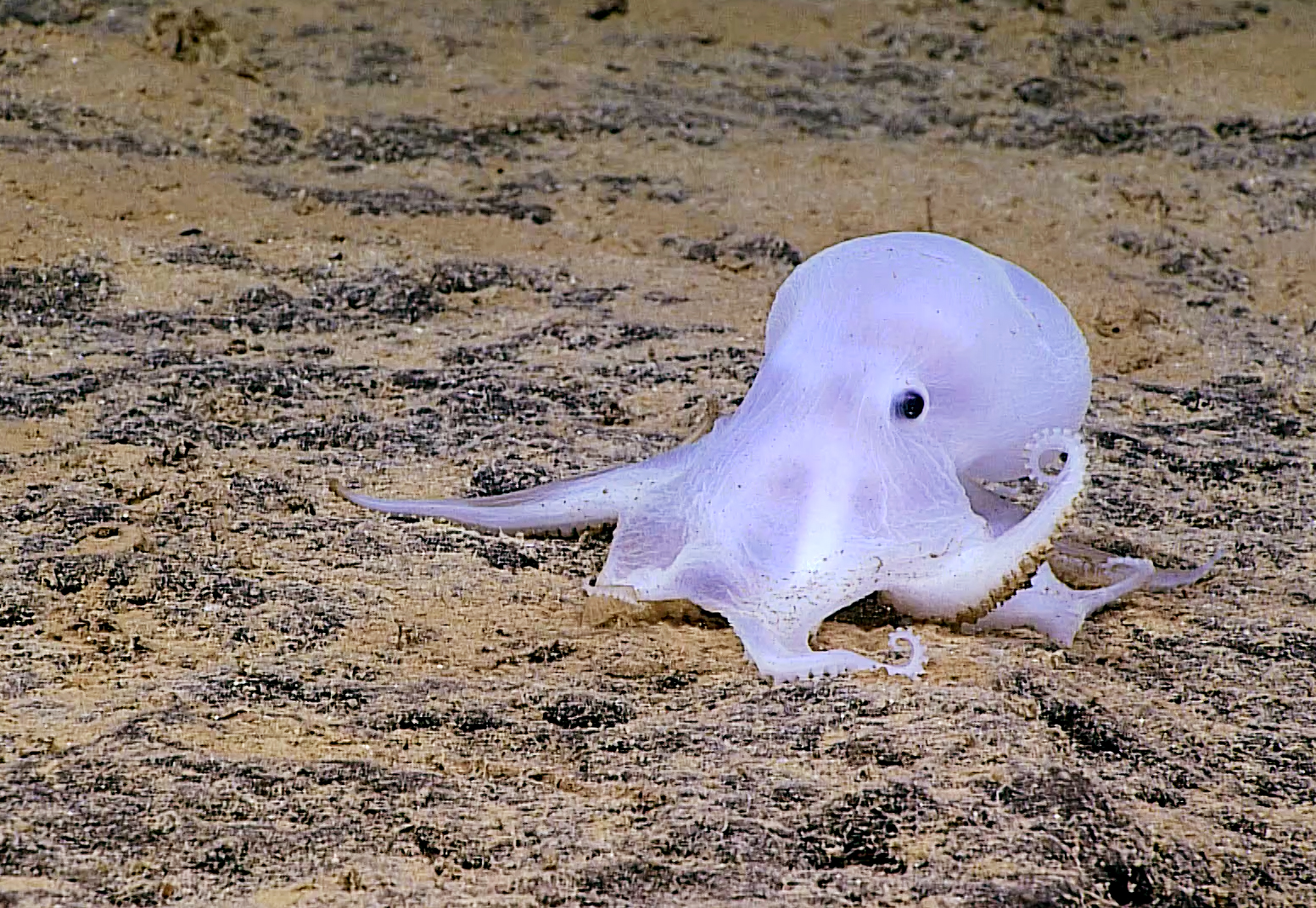
- "Caspar octopus" observed in the Papahānaumokuākea Marine National Monument (near Hawaii) during March 2016

Scientific classification
- Kingdom: Animalia
- Phylum: Mollusca
- Class: Cephalopoda
- Order: Octopoda
- Suborder: Incirrata

= Casper (octopus species) =

Casper octopus

Informally named species of octopus

The informally named "Casper octopus" , also called the "ghost octopus", was first observed in waters off Hawaii in 2016. Similar animals have since been reported off the coast of Ecuador and along the Nazca Ridge.

The taxonomic identity of the Casper octopus remains unresolved because no physical specimen has been examined, and these animals are known primarily from imagery. Video oberservations indicate that the Casper octopus has very little musculature and an almost gelatinous body.

These animals have been referred to in scientific literature as the "Casper morphotype". The morphotype lacks chromatophores, giving individuals a partially translucent appearance reminiscent of the cartoon character Casper the Friendly Ghost. It thus got its name. It also has a single series of suckers.

The Casper morphotype has short arms. As an incrirrate octopod, it lacks the fins characteristic of cirrate octopods such as Grimpoteuthis.The Casper morphotype observed at Necker Ridges of the Hawaiian Archipelago at a depth of 4,290m was described as the deepest recorded sighting of an incirrate octopod.

In the survey, two incirrate octopods were observed brooding egg clutches at depths greater than 4000m in the Peru Basin. Each brood contained approximately 30 eggs , individually attached to stalks of dead sponges growing on manganese nodules. Given the low annual water temperature of about 1.5 °C, deep sea ecologist Autun Purser suggested that egg development and brooding may take years. The removal of nodule fields and crusts for commercial exploitation may cause habitat loss for these octopods.
