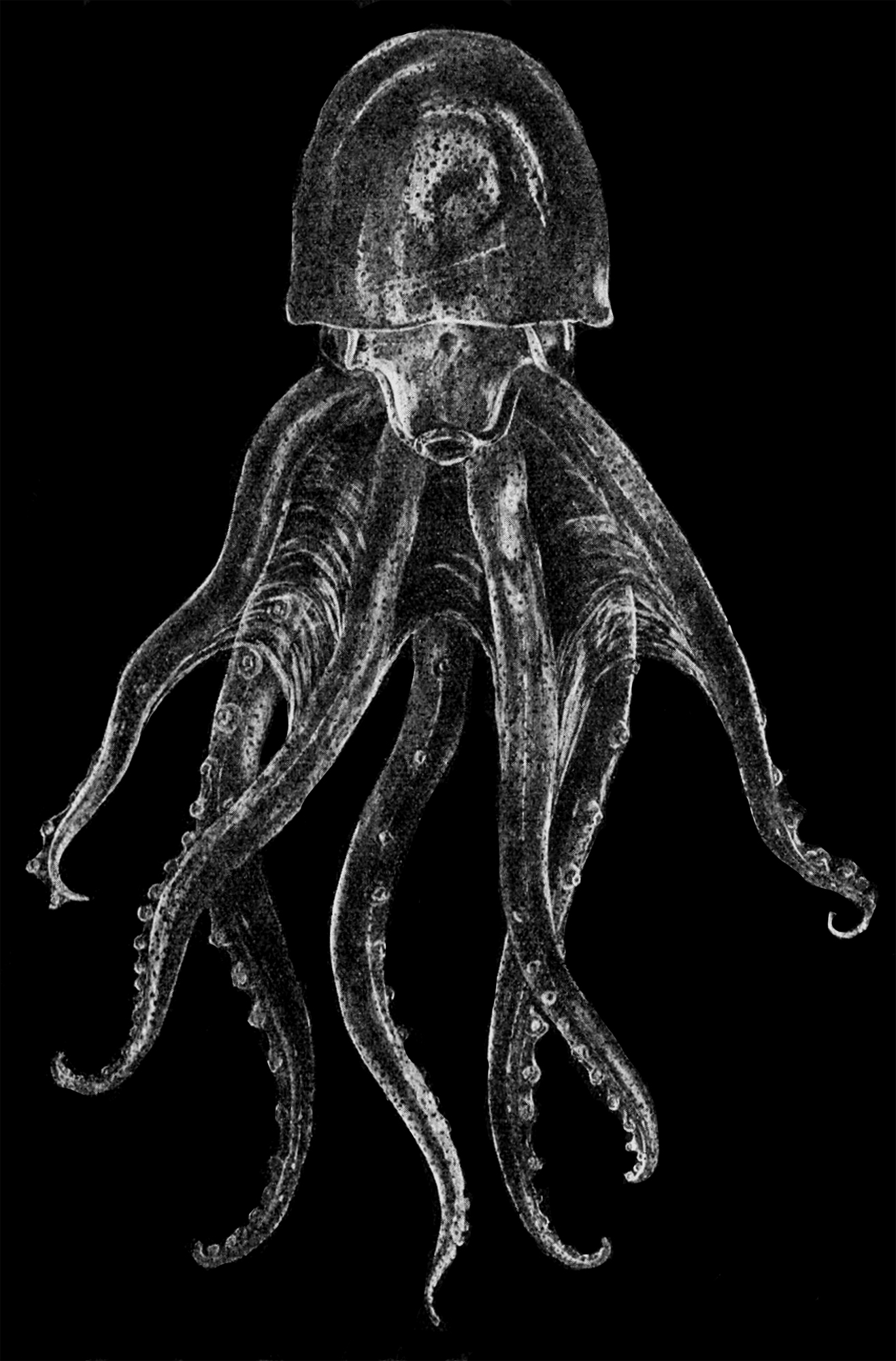
- Belly view of female

Conservation status
- Least Concern (IUCN 3.1)

Scientific classification
- Kingdom: Animalia
- Phylum: Mollusca
- Class: Cephalopoda
- Order: Octopoda
- Family: Amphitretidae
- Genus: Vitreledonella
- Species: V. richardi

Binomial name
- Vitreledonella richardi Joubin, 1918

Synonyms
- Vitreledonella ingeborgae Joubin, 1929; Vitreledonella translucida Robson, 1930

= Glass octopus =

Species of octopus

Vitreledonella richardi, also known as the glass octopus, is an incirrate octopus. It is in the genus Vitreledonella and of the family Amphitretidae.

== Description ==
Vitreledonella richardi is transparent, gelatinous, and nearly colorless.

Adults reach up to 11 cm (4.3 in) in mantle length and a total length of up to 45 cm (18 in). The upper three pairs of arms are subequal in length, about as long as the mantle in juveniles and two to three times longer in adults. The fourth, ventral pair is slightly shorter. Suckers are small, widely spaced, and arranged in a single row. Males possess a hectocotylized third left arm, capable of detaching to deliver sperm during mating. Among mature males, the large ampulla and elongate accessory gland are prominent within the reproductive system.

The species has distinctive rectangular eyes when viewed laterally. This cylindrical design, with a centered lens, limits horizontal vision but is believed to minimize the eye's silhouette when viewed from below, aiding in camouflage. Its radula is heterodont (or heteroglossan), featuring a multicuspid central rhachidian tooth and unicuspid lateral teeth.

== Distribution and habitat ==
Vitreledonella richardi is found in tropical and subtropical seas worldwide. It inhabits mesopelagic to bathypelagic zones of the ocean, typically at depths where sunlight penetration is minimal. Due to its deep-sea habitat, encounters with this species in the wild are rare. One of the few documented observations occurred in 2021, when researchers from Boston University recorded video footage of two individuals during an expedition aboard the research vessel Falkor.

== Reproduction ==
Vitreledonella richardi is ovoviviparous. The female broods her eggs, of which hundreds are within the mantle cavity. Each egg measures about 4 mm (0.16 in) in length. Newborn larvae have a mantle length around 2.2 mm (0.087 in). The young paralarvae are left to fend for themselves as the mother quickly dies after their birth.

Researchers at Central Marine Fisheries Research Institute conducted an experiment that later concluded young paralarvae beaks change as they get older, along with the depth of water which they want to live in. Younger paralarvae have stronger beaks to tear prey's flesh off since that was all they ate. Once they got older, they lose that beak and form a faint, less developed one to eat softer-bodied prey. With their diet changing, they are predicted to move up from deeper levels (between 310 and 440, but can be as far as 1000 m) to the subsurface (between 110 and 300 m) as they get older.

== Ecology ==
The glass octopus is prey to northern bottlenose whales, including a specific individual known as the Tåsinge whale.
