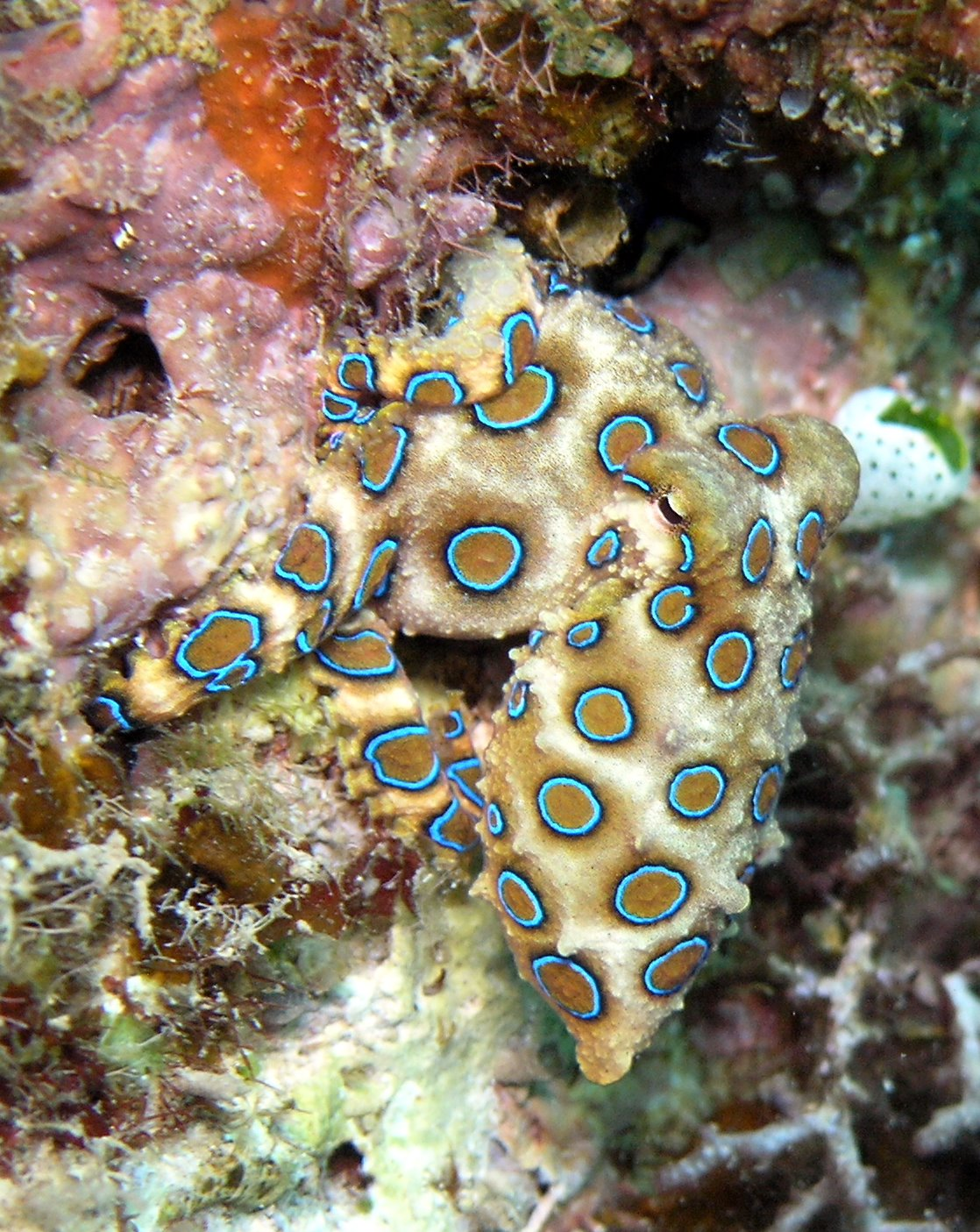
- Greater blue-ringed octopus (Hapalochlaena lunulata)
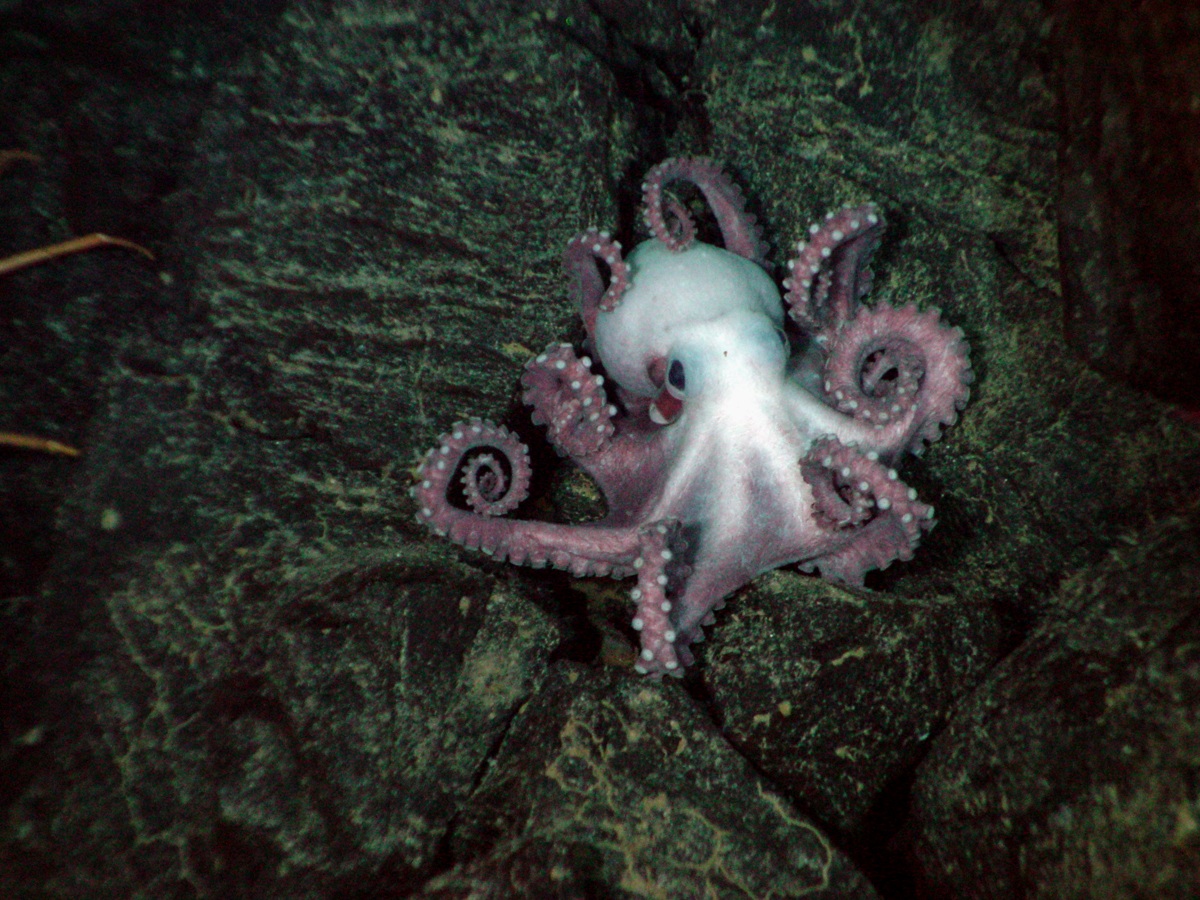
- Benthoctopus sp.

Scientific classification
- Kingdom: Animalia
- Phylum: Mollusca
- Class: Cephalopoda
- Order: Octopoda
- Suborder: Incirrata
- Superfamily: Octopodoidea

Families
- Amphitretidae; Bolitaenidae; Octopodidae; Vitreledonellidae

= Octopodoidea =

Superfamily of octopuses

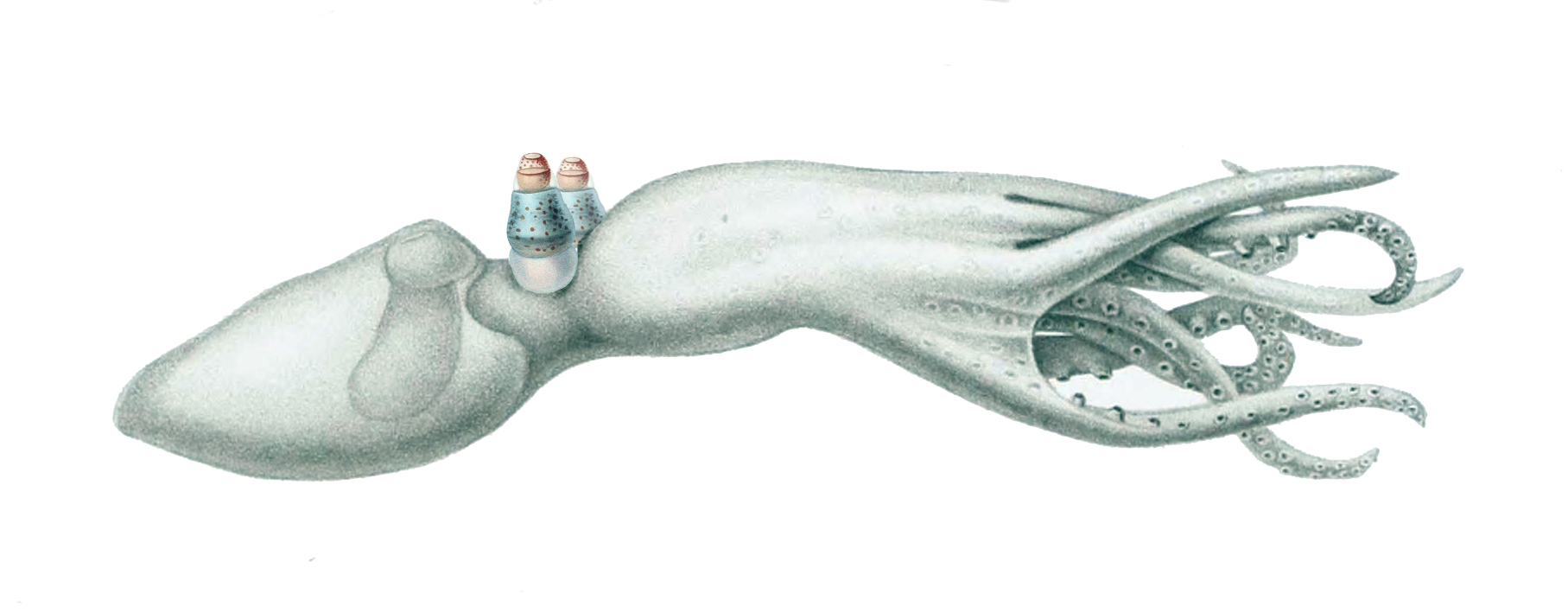
A member of the family Amphitretidae.

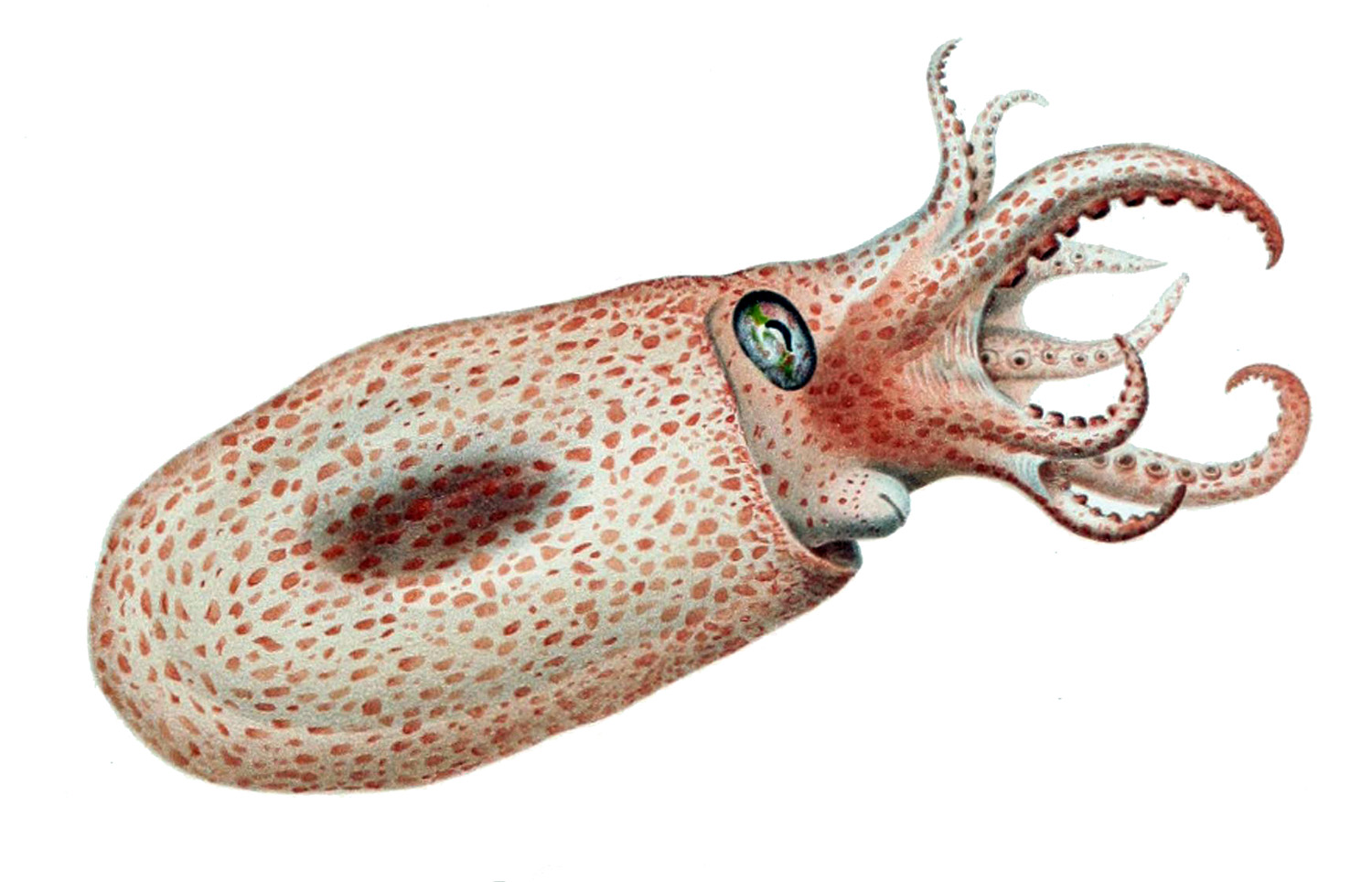
A member of the family Bolitaenidae.

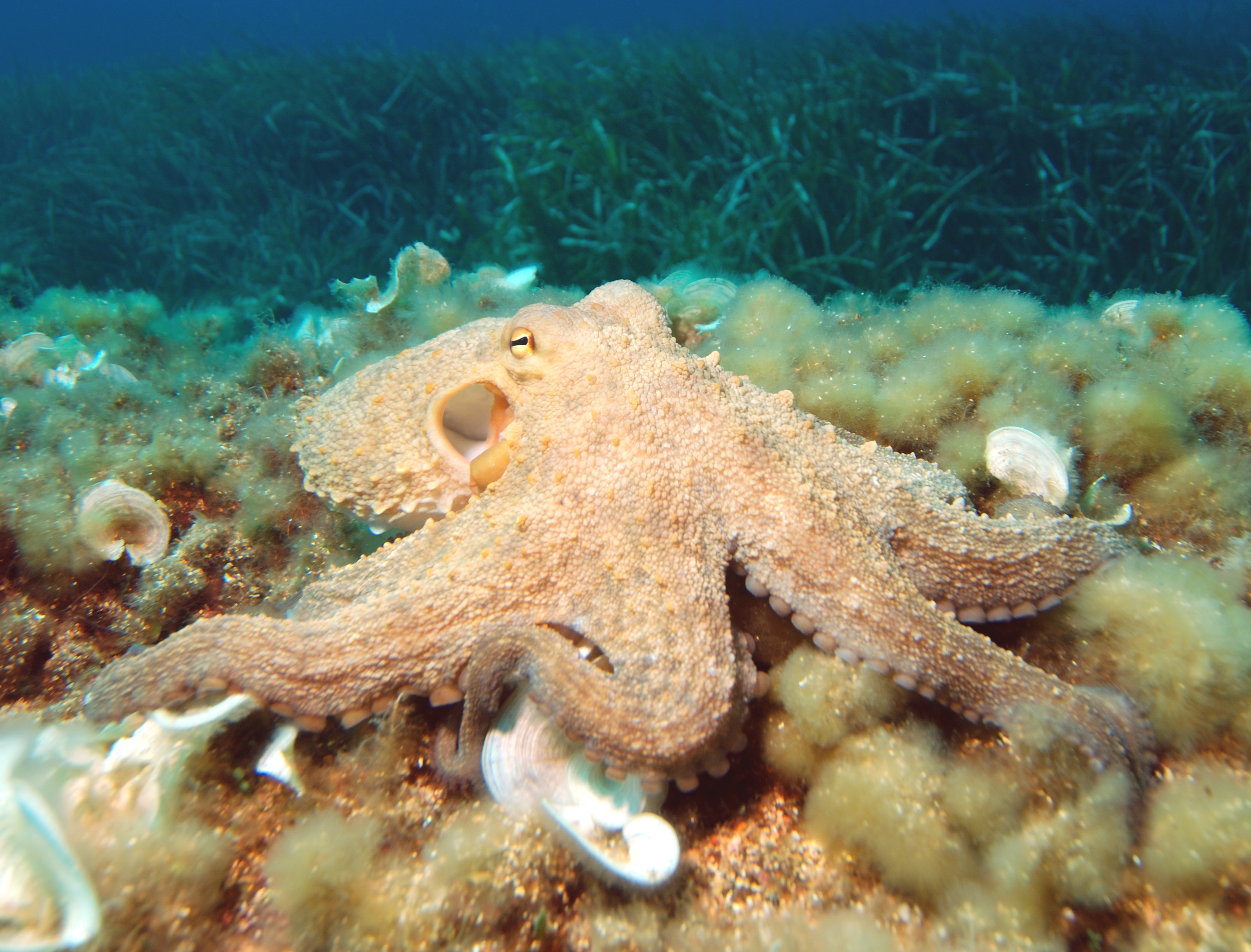
A member of the family Octopodidae.

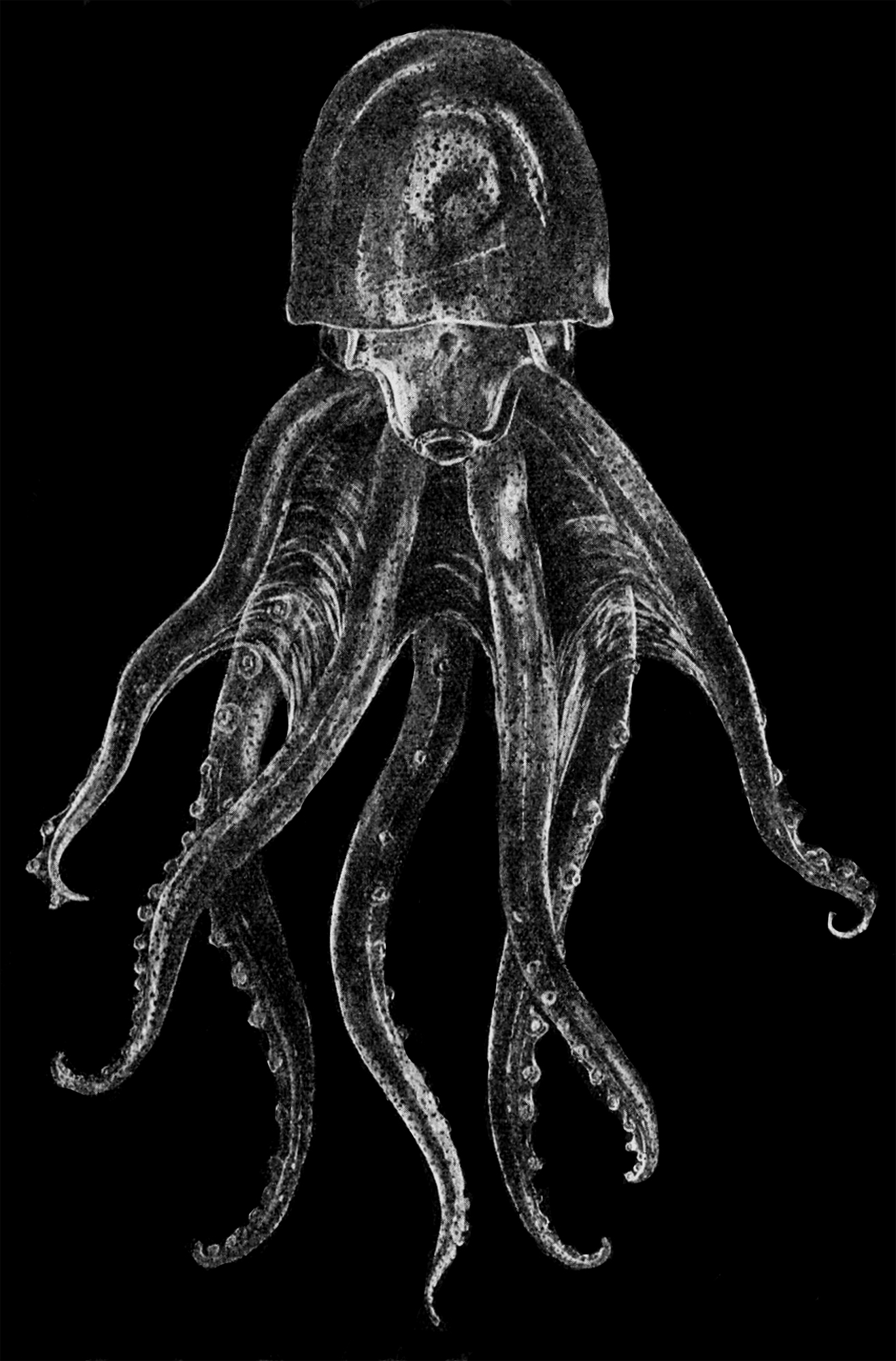
A member of the family Vitreledonellidae.

Octopodoidea is a superfamily of the suborder Incirrata containing all extant octopods except for the cirrate octopodes, argonauts (Alloposidae, Argonautidae, Ocythoidae and Tremoctopodidae), and the vampire squid.

== Families ==
- Suborder Incirrina
  - Superfamily Argonautoidea
  - Superfamily Octopodoidea
    - Family Amphitretidae
      - subfamily Bolitaeninae
      - subfamily Vitreledonellinae
    - Family Bathypolypodidae
    - Family Eledonidae
    - Family Enteroctopodidae
    - Family Megaleledonidae
    - Family Octopodidae
