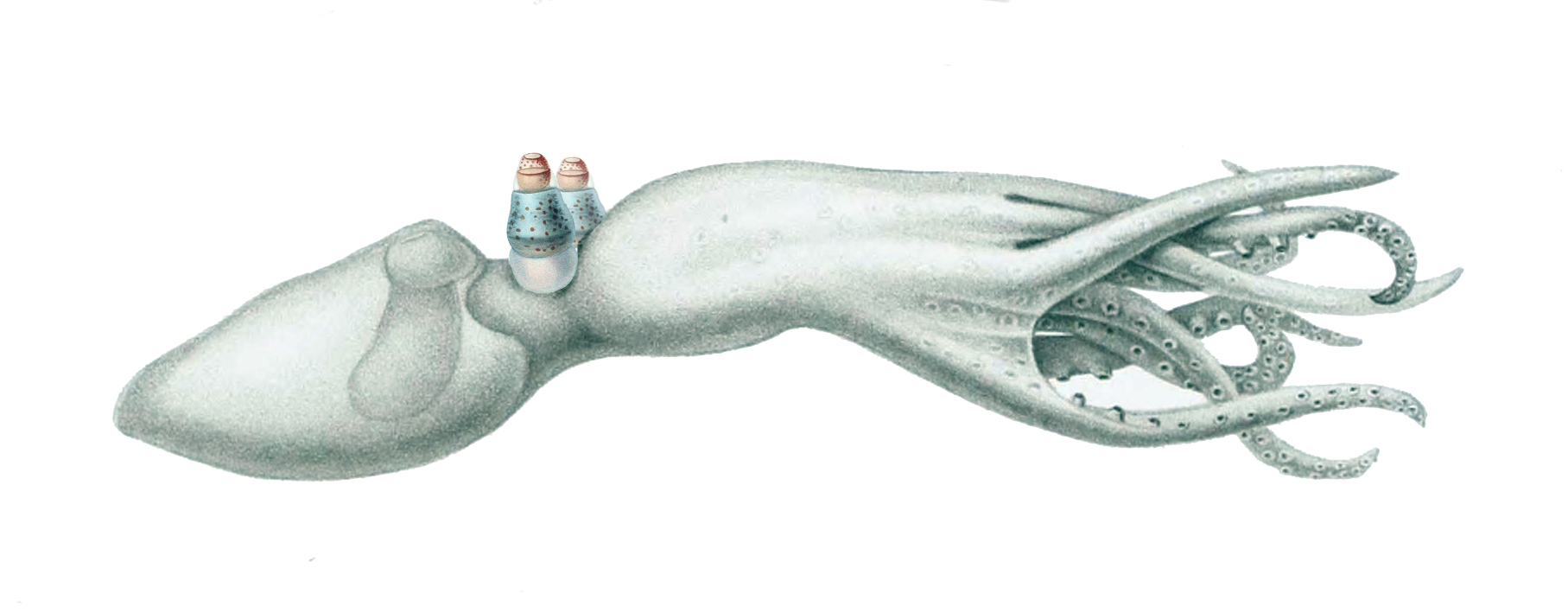

Conservation status
- Least Concern (IUCN 3.1)

Scientific classification
- Kingdom: Animalia
- Phylum: Mollusca
- Class: Cephalopoda
- Order: Octopoda
- Family: Amphitretidae
- Genus: Amphitretus
- Species: A. pelagicus

Binomial name
- Amphitretus pelagicus Hoyle, 1885

= Telescope octopus =

Species of octopus

The telescope octopus (Amphitretus pelagicus) is a species of pelagic octopus found in tropical and subtropical regions of the Indian and Pacific Oceans.

It is transparent, almost colorless, and has 8 arms, all of the same size.

It is the only octopus to have tubular eyes, which is the reason it is commonly referred to as telescope octopus.

The telescope octopus is about 8inch (203mm) long, with its arms making up for about half its length.
