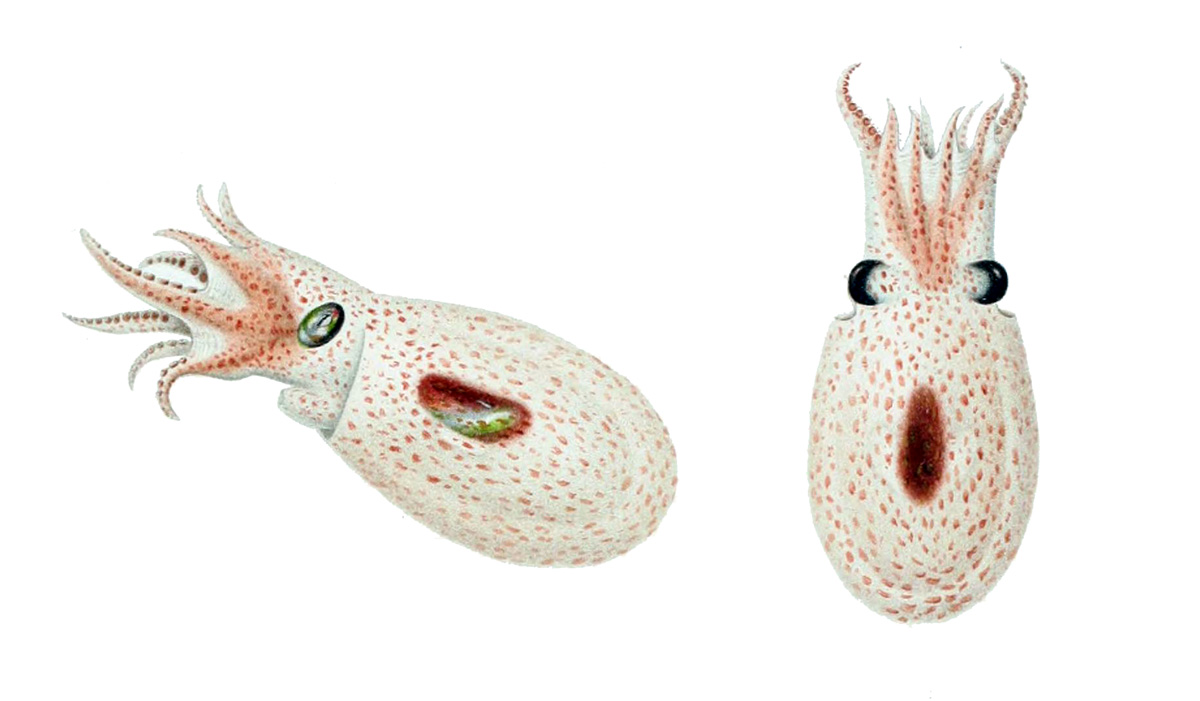
- Japetella diaphana

Scientific classification
- Domain: Eukaryota
- Kingdom: Animalia
- Phylum: Mollusca
- Class: Cephalopoda
- Order: Octopoda
- Family: Amphitretidae
- Subfamily: Bolitaeninae
- Genus: Japetella; Hoyle, 1885

Type species
- Japetella diaphana Hoyle, 1885

Species
- Japetella diaphana Hoyle, 1885; Japetella heathi (Berry, 1911); Japetella taningi (Thore, 1949) (nomen dubium)

= Japetella =

Genus of octopuses

Japetella is a genus of pelagic octopods from the subfamily Bolitaeninae in the family Amphitretidae. It contains at least one species but another two have been questionably raised with Japetella heathi being of doubtful validity, although currently accepted and Japetella taningi being classed as a nomen dubium.

The genus contains bioluminescent species.

Japetella diaphana inhabits the oxygen minimum zone of the eastern tropical Pacific Ocean. It is a species of midwater octopus which is relatively abundant in the Gulf of Mexico compared to the Monterey Bay. It has a bioluminescent, yellow ring which starts at the base of its arms, of which all are of the same size. The arms are also very short, no longer than the mantle length. Total length may be around 12 cm (4.7 in). It has been proposed that the female octopus uses the ring to communicate with the opposite gender, perhaps to attract the male to mate. Its chromatophores allow it to go almost fully transparent with spots, to be of a solid orange. The octopus never touches the seafloor, living its entire life in the water column. Mature adults usually live at a depth of 1,450 m (4,760 ft), while mating occurs at 1,000 m (3,300 ft). The female's bioluminescent ring may be of a specific wavelength, to prevent miscommunication and predator attraction. After mating, the female ascends to a depth of 800 m (2,600 ft).
