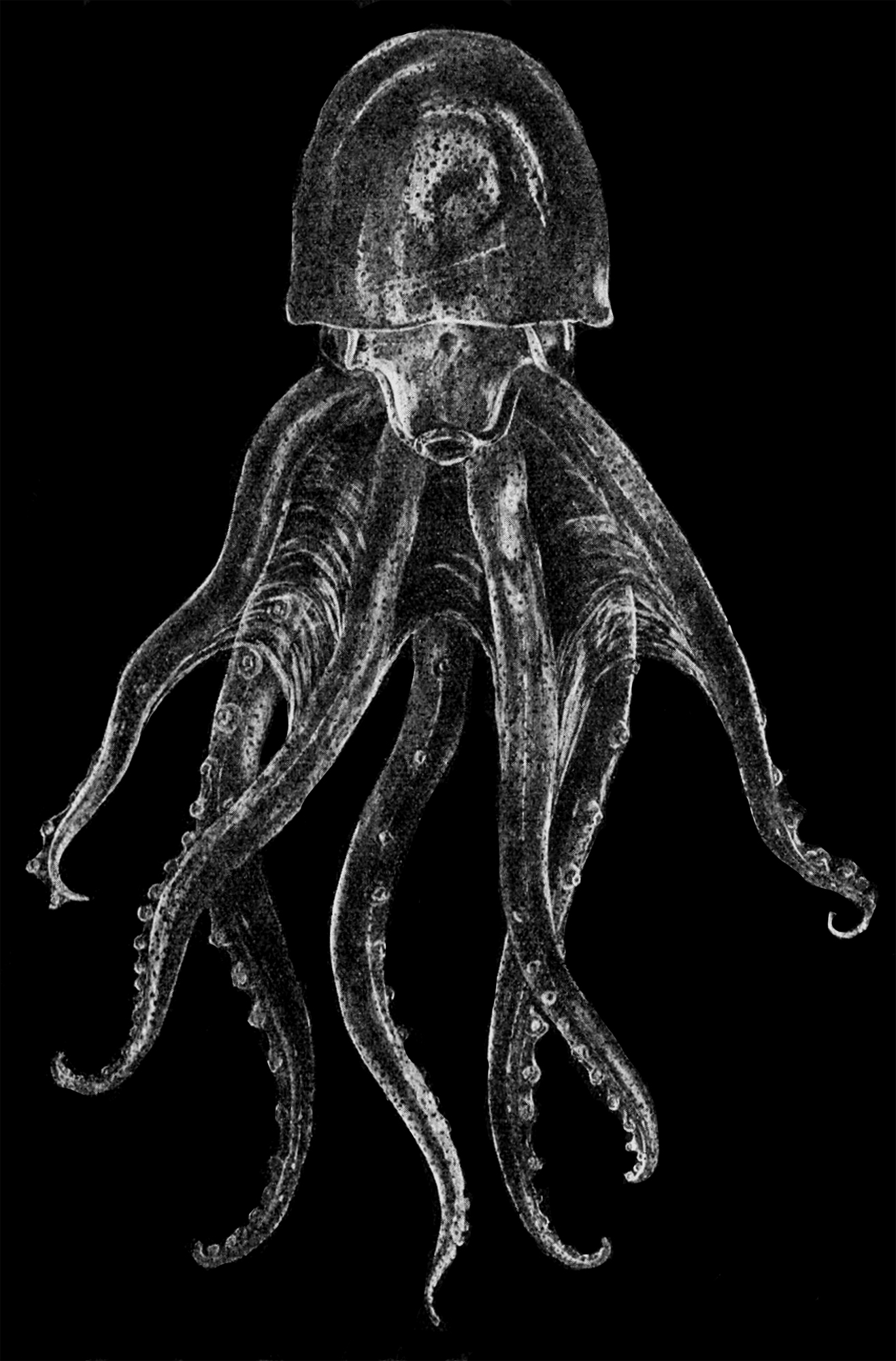
- Vitreledonella richardi

Scientific classification
- Kingdom: Animalia
- Phylum: Mollusca
- Class: Cephalopoda
- Order: Octopoda
- Family: Amphitretidae
- Subfamily: Vitreledonellinae; G. C. Robson, 1932
- Genus: Vitreledonella; Joubin, 1918

Type species
- Vitreledonella richardi Joubin, 1918

Species
- Vitreledonella alberti Joubin, 1924; Vitreledonella richardi Joubin, 1918

= Vitreledonella =

Genus of octopuses

Vitreledonella is a genus of mesopelagic octopods from the family Amphitretidae which contains two species, one of which is the glass octopus.

These octopods have the sucker on their arms arranged in a single series with the suckers widely separated from each other. The third left arm is hectocotylised with a spherical vesicle at the distal end and in males the other arms have suckers which are enlarged beyond the web. The eye has strong lateral compression with a near rectangular shape in lateral view and with the width equal to the diameter of the lens. There is a ventral, blunt rostrum-like extension on the eye which contains iridescent tissue above the eye. The opening to the mantle is broad, the radula is multicuspid and linear in form with the first and second lateral tooth each being unicuspid, which means that this species has a heteroglossan radula. The long and slender digestive gland is spindle-shaped and the stomach is positioned dorsally to the digestive gland.

Amphitretus and Bolitaena are two other transparent, gelatinous pelagic incirrate octopods. Both of these genera differ from Vitreledonella in that the right third arm is hectocotylized and the radula is ctenodont (with comb-like individual teeth).

== List of species ==
According to the EOL:

- Vitreledonella
  - Vitreledonella alberti Joubin, 1924
  - Vitreledonella richardi Joubin, 1918
