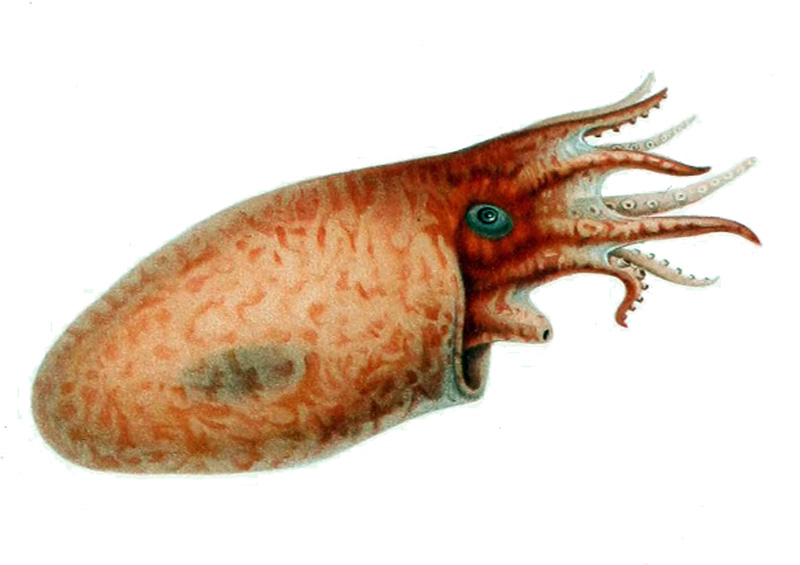

Conservation status
- Least Concern (IUCN 3.1)

Scientific classification
- Kingdom: Animalia
- Phylum: Mollusca
- Class: Cephalopoda
- Order: Octopoda
- Family: Amphitretidae
- Genus: Bolitaena
- Species: B. pygmaea

Binomial name
- Bolitaena pygmaea (A. E. Verrill, 1884)

= Bolitaena pygmaea =

Species of Cephalopoda

Bolitaena pygmaea is a species of Octopoda in the family Amphitretidae. B. Pygmaea are often found in tropical and subtropical water not including the southwest part of the Atlantic ranging in depths between 100 and 1400 meters.
