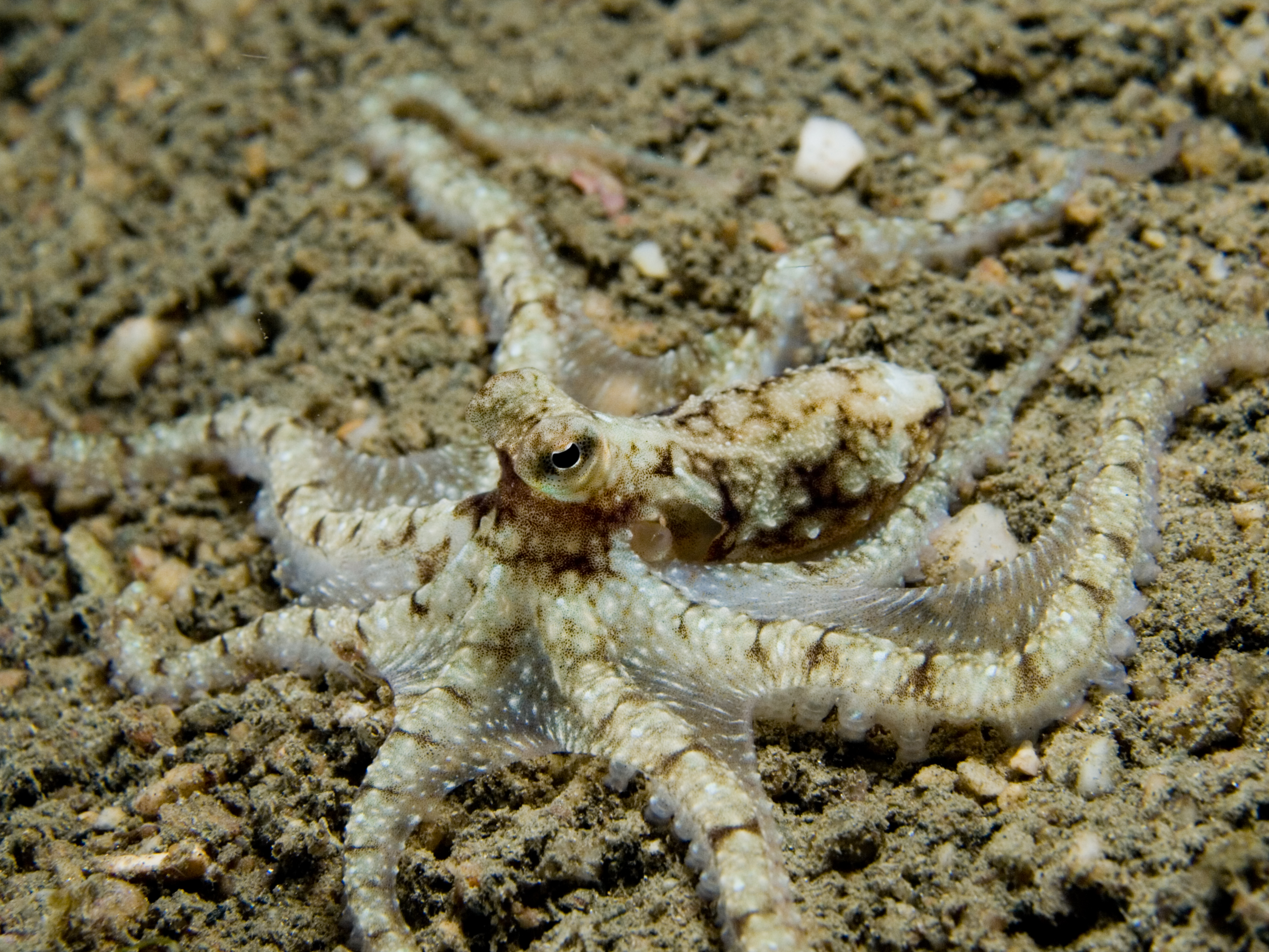
- An octopus active during the night in the coastal waters of northern East Timor
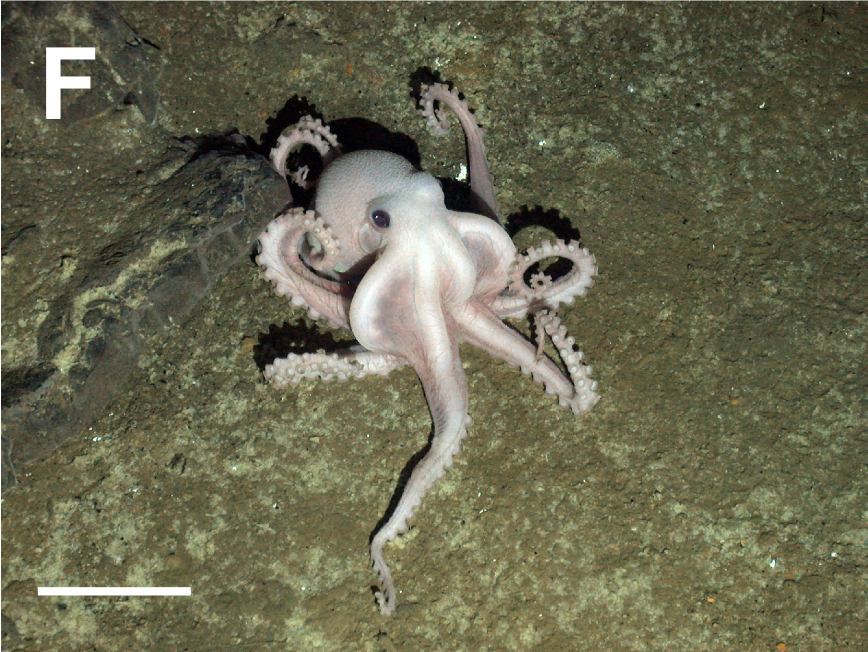
- An unidentified octopus observed on East Scotia Ridge at a depth of 2,394 m (scale bar: 10 cm)

Scientific classification
- Kingdom: Animalia
- Phylum: Mollusca
- Class: Cephalopoda
- Order: Octopoda
- Suborder: Incirrata; Grimpe, 1916

Families
- Superfamily Octopodoidea; Amphitretidae; Bolitaenidae; Octopodidae; Vitreledonellidae; Superfamily Argonautoidea; Alloposidae; Argonautidae; Ocythoidae; Tremoctopodidae

Synonyms
- Incirrina

= Incirrata =

Suborder of octopuses

Incirrata (or Incirrina) is a suborder of the order Octopoda. The suborder contains the classic "benthic octopuses," as well as many pelagic octopus families, including the paper nautiluses. The incirrate octopuses are distinguished from the cirrate octopuses by the absence in the former of the "cirri" filaments (found with the suckers) for which the cirrates are named, as well as by the lack of paired swimming fins on the head, and lack of a small internal shell (the "shell" of Argonauta species is not a true shell, but a thin calcite egg case). This is except for the Sepioidea.

== Classification ==
- Class Cephalopoda
  - Subclass Nautiloidea: nautilus
  - Subclass †Ammonoidea: ammonites
  - Subclass Coleoidea
    - Superorder Decapodiformes: squid, cuttlefish
    - Superorder Octopodiformes
      - Family †Trachyteuthididae (incertae sedis)
      - Order Vampyromorphida: vampire squid
      - Order Octopoda
        - Genus †Keuppia (incertae sedis)
        - Genus †Palaeoctopus (incertae sedis)
        - Genus †Proteroctopus (incertae sedis)
        - Genus †Styletoctopus (incertae sedis)
        - Suborder Cirrina: finned deep-sea octopus
        - Suborder Incirrata
          - Superfamily Octopodoidea
            - Family Amphitretidae
              - subfamily Amphitretinae
              - subfamily Bolitaeninae
              - subfamily Vitreledonellinae
            - Family Bathypolypodidae
            - Family Eledonidae
            - Family Enteroctopodidae
            - Family Megaleledonidae
            - Family Octopodidae
          - Superfamily Argonautoidea
            - Family Alloposidae: seven-arm octopus
            - Family Argonautidae: argonauts
            - Family Ocythoidae: tuberculate pelagic octopus
            - Family Tremoctopodidae: blanket octopus

Note: A new unnamed white species was discovered February 26, 2016 by NOAA's Deep Discoverer about 2.5 miles below the ocean surface near the Hawaiian Archipelago.
