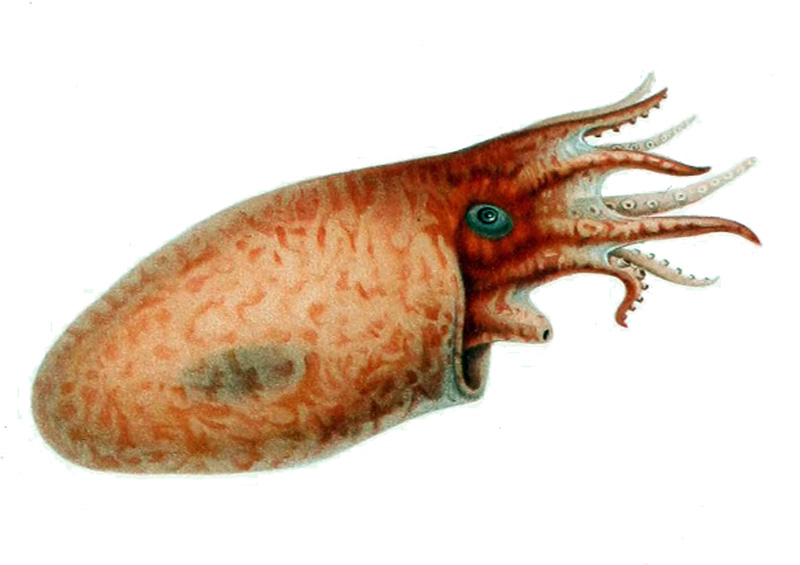
- Bolitaena pygmaea

Scientific classification
- Domain: Eukaryota
- Kingdom: Animalia
- Phylum: Mollusca
- Class: Cephalopoda
- Order: Octopoda
- Family: Amphitretidae
- Subfamily: Bolitaeninae
- Genus: Bolitaena; Steenstrup, 1859

Type species
- Eledonella pygmaea A. E. Verrill, 1884

Species
- Bolitaena massyae (Robson, 1924); Bolitaena pygmaea (A. E. Verrill, 1884)

Synonyms
- Eledonella Verrill, 1884

= Bolitaena =

Genus of octopuses

Bolitaena is a genus of pelagic octopods from the subfamily Bolitaeninae in the family Amphitretidae. It contains two species, a third species Bolitaena microcotyla is now regarded as a synonym of Haliphron atlanticus.

The genus contains bioluminescent species.
