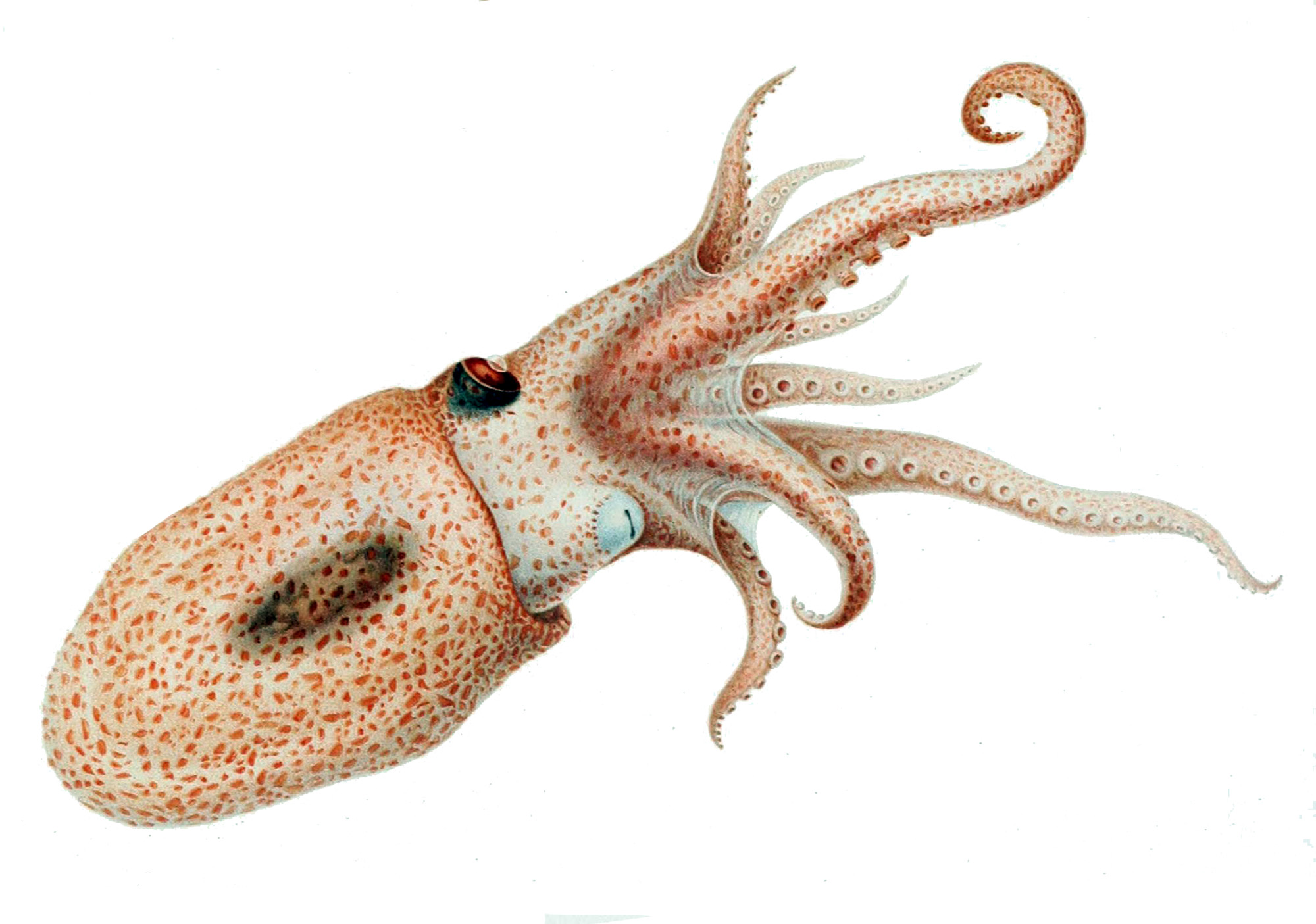
- Female Bolitaena pygmaea from the Gulf of Guinea
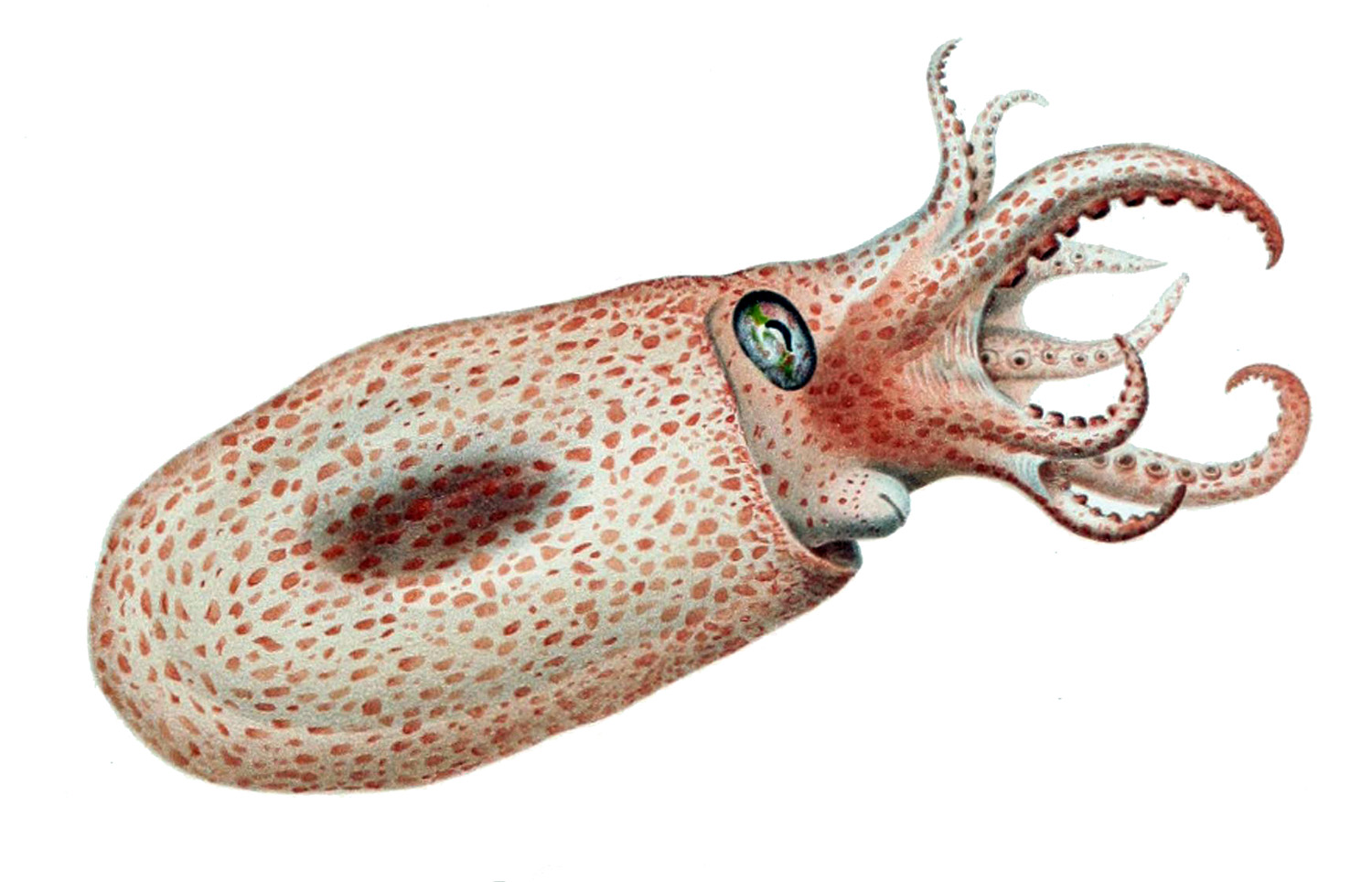
- Female Japetella diaphana from northeastern São Tomé Island

Scientific classification
- Kingdom: Animalia
- Phylum: Mollusca
- Class: Cephalopoda
- Order: Octopoda
- Family: Amphitretidae
- Subfamily: Bolitaeninae; Chun, 1911

Genera
- Bolitaena; Japetella

= Bolitaeninae =

Subfamily of octopuses

The Bolitaeninae are a subfamily, in the family Amphitretidae, of small, common pelagic octopuses found in all tropical and temperate oceans of the world. The taxonomy of this taxon is not entirely certain. Recent research suggests just two genera exist, Bolitaena and Japetella, both of which are thought to be monotypic by some authorities and under this view, the family would represent two very similar species: Bolitaena pygmaea and Japetella diaphana. However, currently a second species of Bolitaena, B. massyae is also recognised.

== Physical description ==
Bolitaenins are characterised by their small size—up to 8.5 cm or 3.3 in mantle length and 12 cm total length in Japetella species—and their comparatively short arms, much shorter than their dome-shaped mantles. The arms have a single series of suckers; in males, these suckers are greatly enlarged on the third right arm. In Bolitaena (but not Japetella) this arm is also modified into a hectocotylus, an appendage used to facilitate transfer of spermatophores during mating.

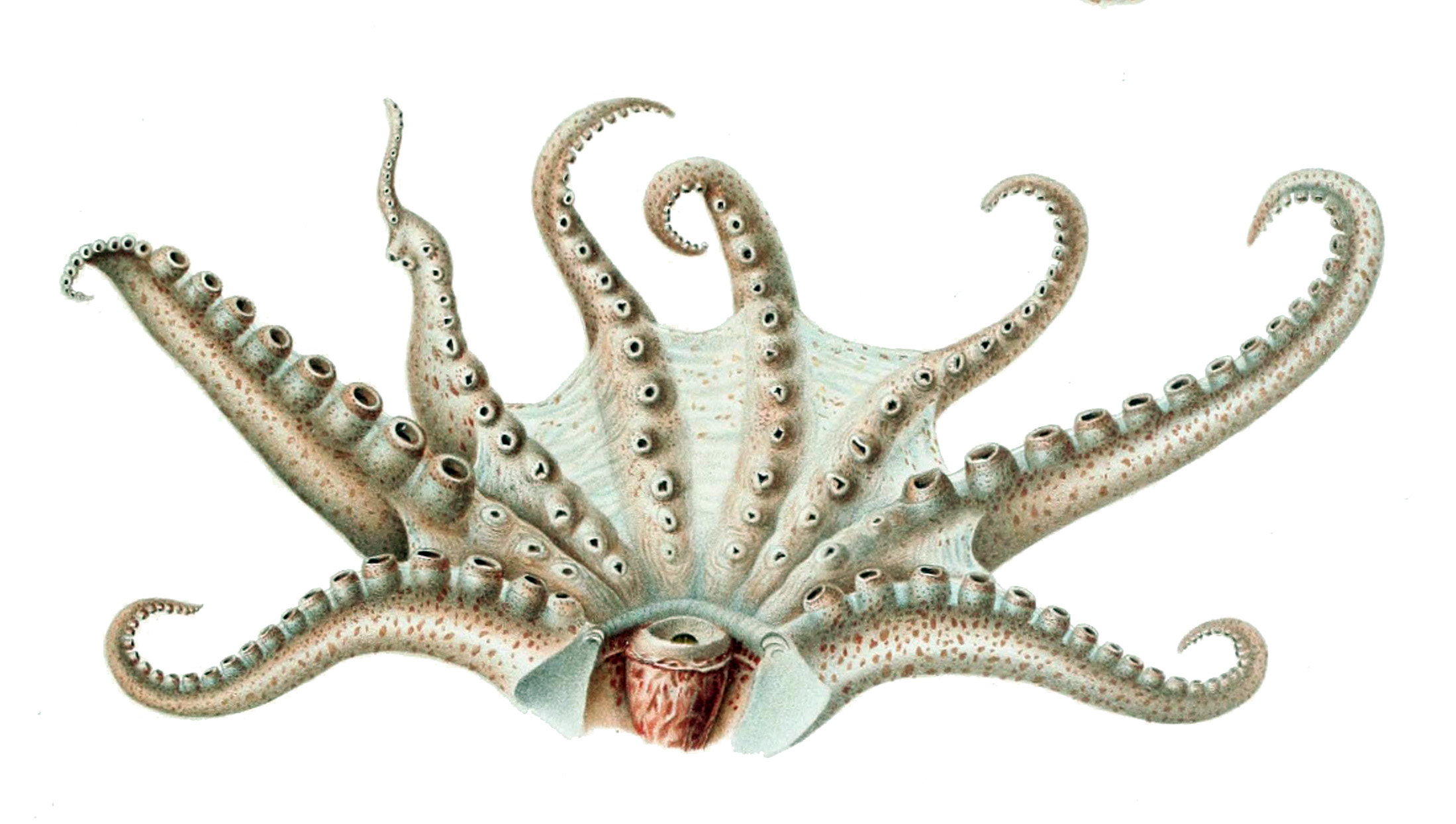
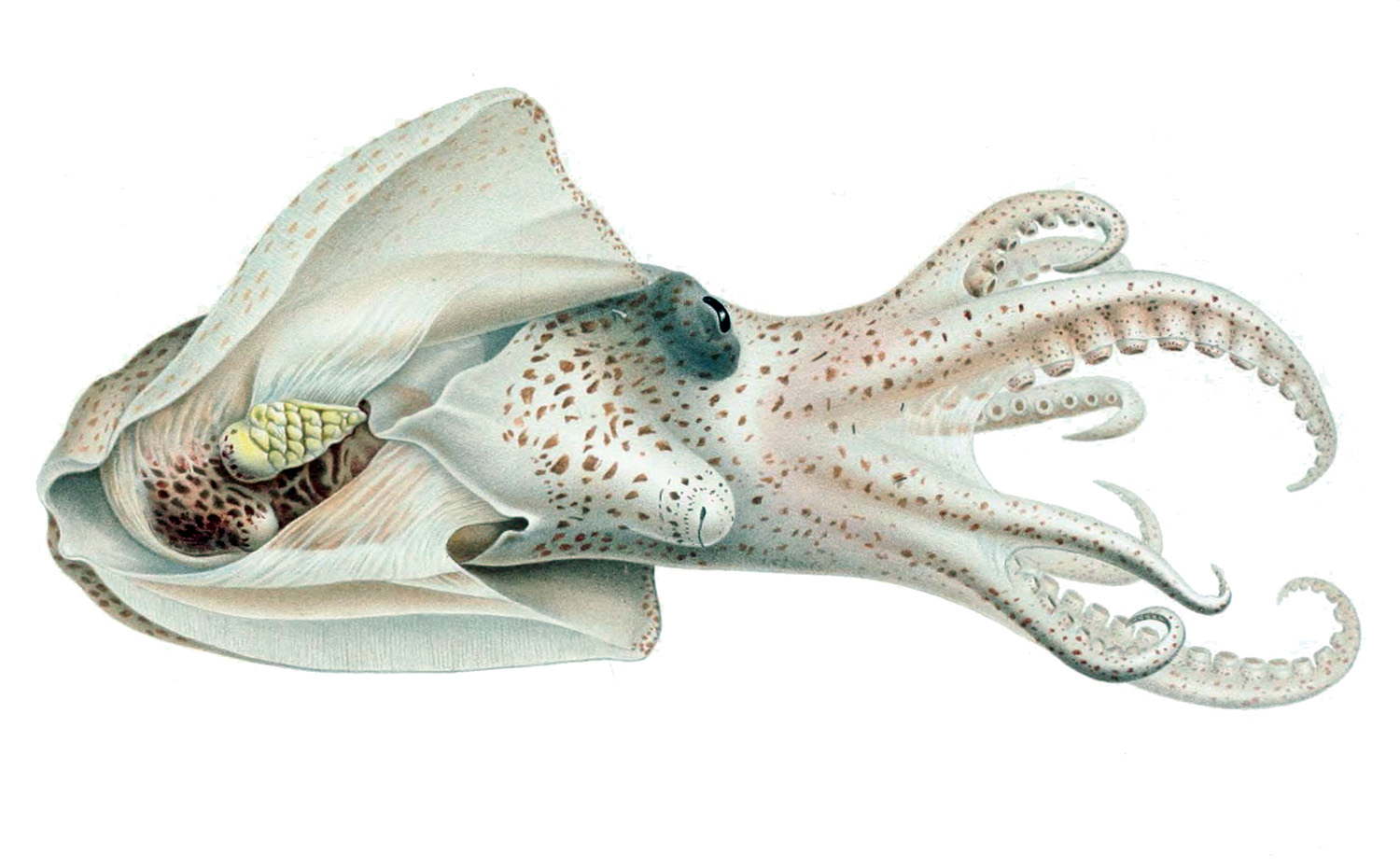
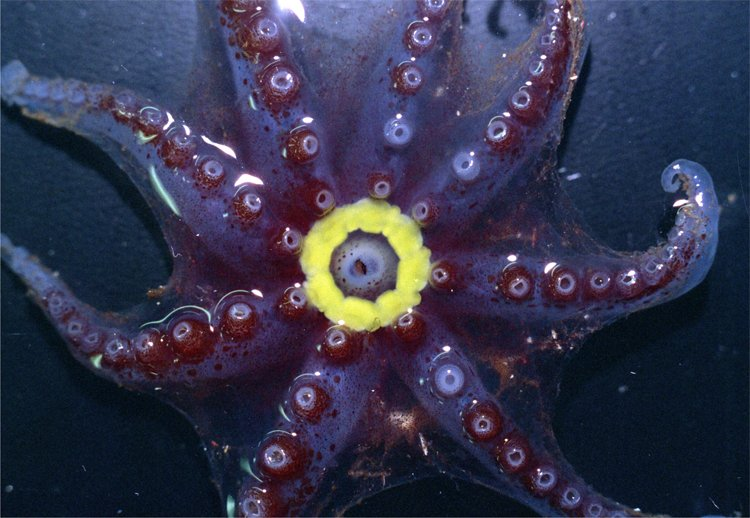
Left: Arms and buccal mass of Japetella diaphana
Middle: Dissected male Japetella diaphana
Right: Female Bolitaena pygmaea. The yellow bioluminescence ring is likely used to attract males.

The eyes of both species are laterally compressed and are distinctly smaller and set further apart from the brain on longer optic stalks in Bolitaena than in Japetella. This feature may be the only way to differentiate the two genera when examining subadults. Mature males are rarely encountered. Their translucent, gelatinous bodies are fragile and easily damaged during collection.

Perhaps the most striking feature of the family is seen in mature females. Upon maturity, a ring-shaped photophore (a light-producing organ) develops to encircle the mouth. This is believed to be an adaptation to life in gloomy, deep ocean waters. The bioluminescent ring may help males and females find each other.

== Habitat ==
Mature bolitaenins occupy depths in the meso- to bathypelagic zones of the water column, down to about 1,425 m. Younger animals (under 20 mm mantle length) are known to remain in shallower waters, either from 170–270 m or 500–800 m depending on size. Japetella is known to venture into far northern waters.

== Reproduction ==
Mating is thought to occur at or below 1,000 m deep. In the darkness, whether mating is successful or not may depend on the female; she can choose whether to signal the male with her circumoral photophore. The light emitted by the photophore is believed to be of a specific wavelength, possibly both preventing miscommunication and the attraction of predators.

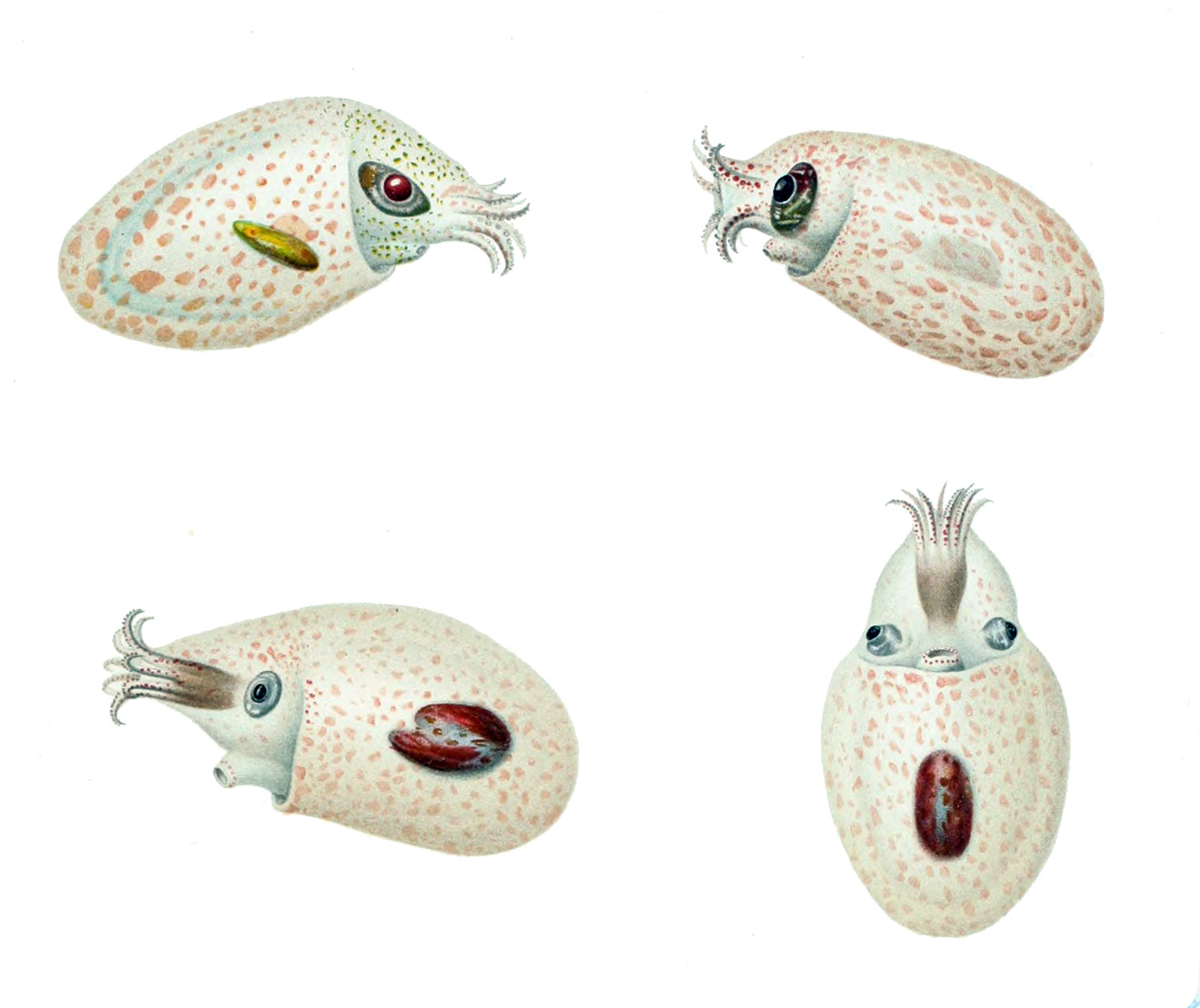
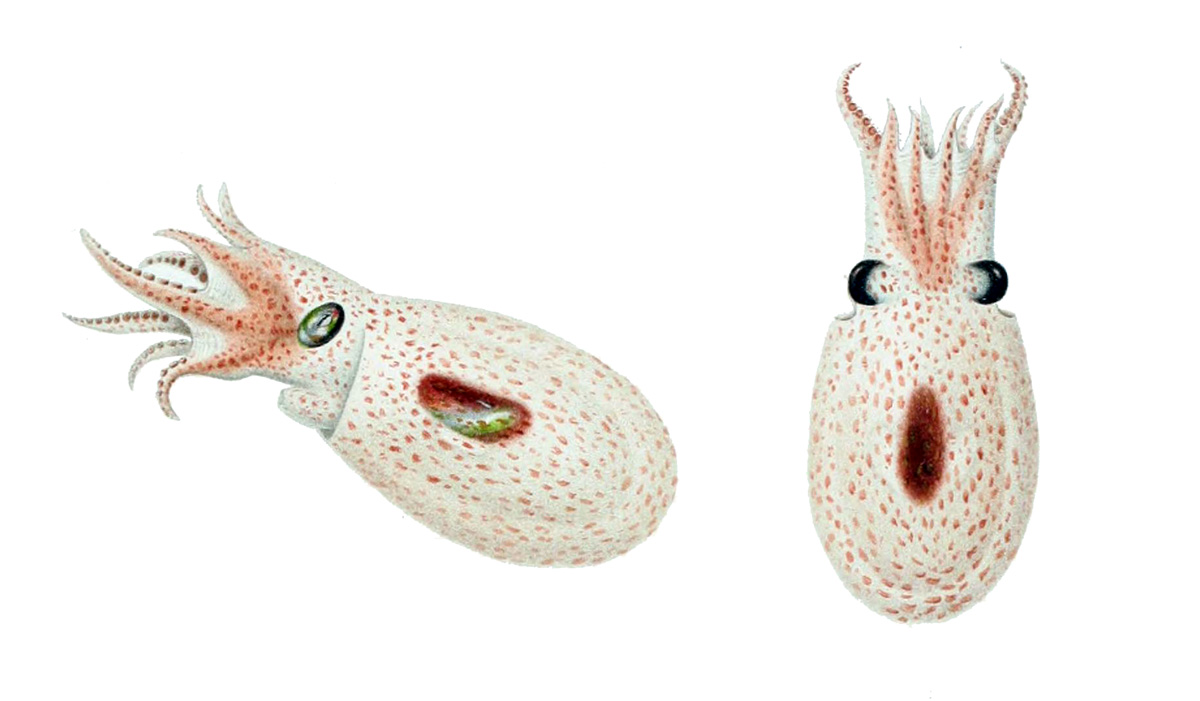
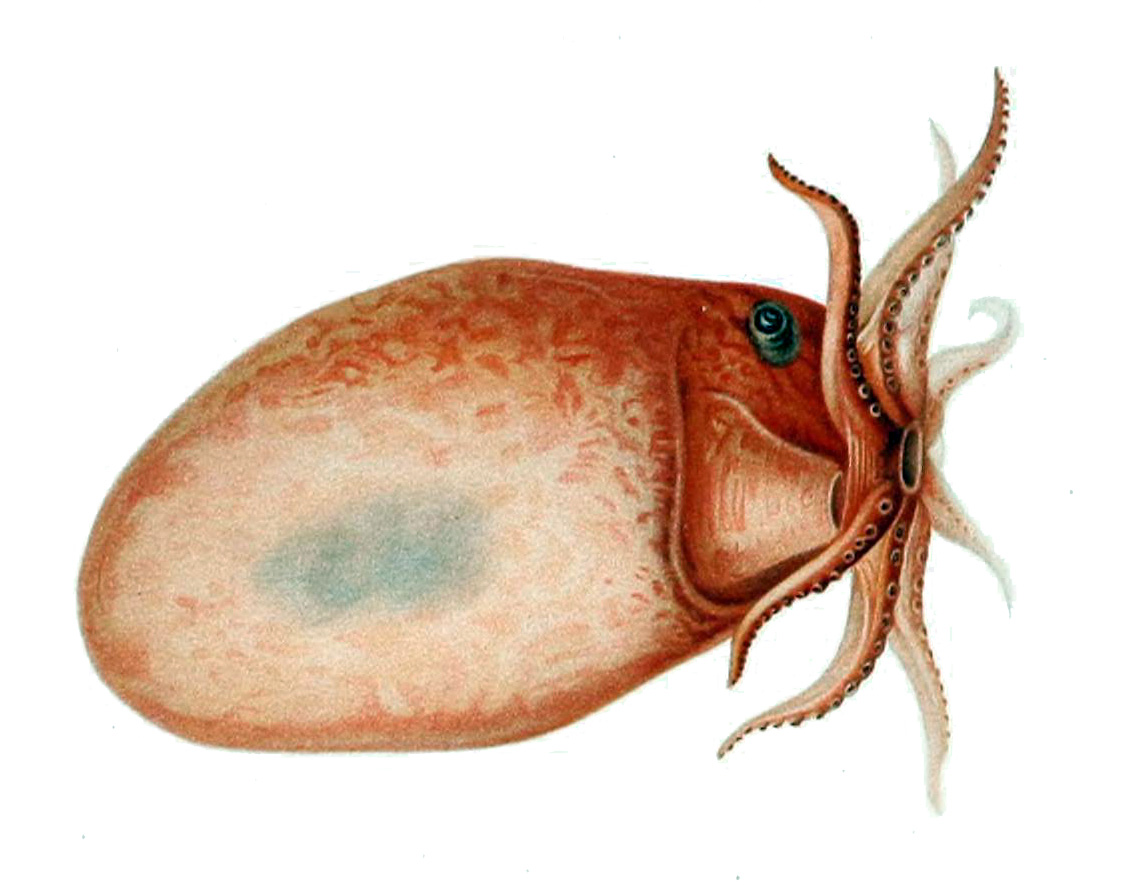
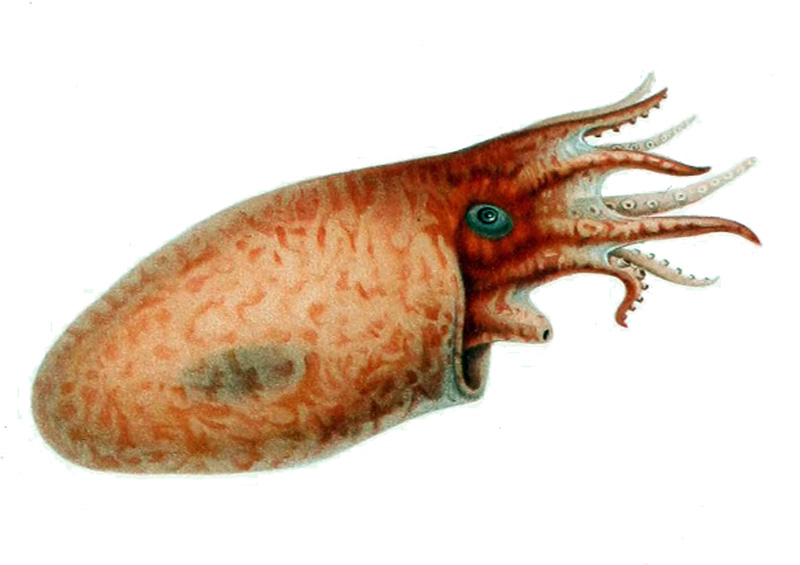
Immature bolitaenids at various stages of development: (left) immature specimens of J. diaphana from Sumatra (top left), southwestern Sri Lanka (top right), and southern Sierra Leone (bottom); (centre left) immature J. diaphana from the Gulf of Guinea; (centre right and right) juvenile female B. pygmaea.

After mating, the female then rises to about 800 m to brood. Her eggs are interconnected by a number of stalks and the whole mass is held safely by means of suckers near her mouth. Due to the cold (4–5 °C) environment, brooding likely takes several months; the female is thought to forgo food during this entire period. After hatching, the young octopuses rise to the productive, upper 300 m of the water column where they remain until reaching a certain size (7–20 mm). As they mature, the young begin their gradual descent to the mesopelagic and eventually bathypelagic zones.

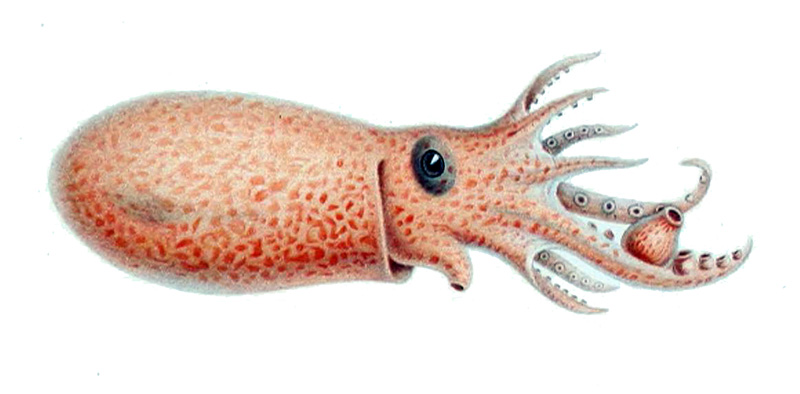
Male B. pygmaea, probably taken during the Michael-Sars Expedition
