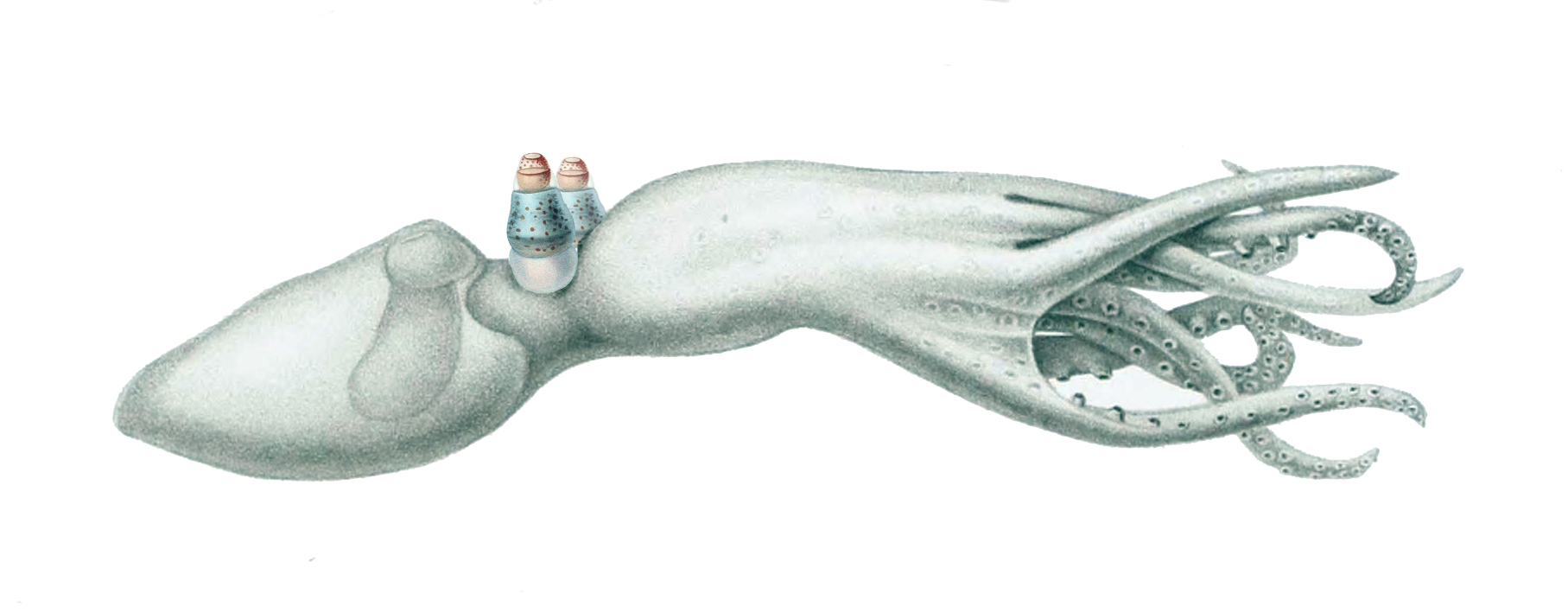

Scientific classification
- Kingdom: Animalia
- Phylum: Mollusca
- Class: Cephalopoda
- Order: Octopoda
- Superfamily: Octopodoidea
- Family: Amphitretidae
- Subfamily: Amphitretinae
- Genus: Amphitretus; Hoyle, 1885

Type species
- Amphitretus pelagicus Hoyle, 1885

Species
- Amphitretus pelagicus; Amphitretus thielei

= Amphitretus =

Genus of octopuses

Amphitretus is a genus of pelagic gelatinous octopuses. It is the sole genus of subfamily Amphitretinae, one of three subfamilies in the family Amphitretidae and consists of two species. Some authorities consider Amphitretus thielei as a subspecies of Amphitretus pelagicus, which would make the genus monotypic.
