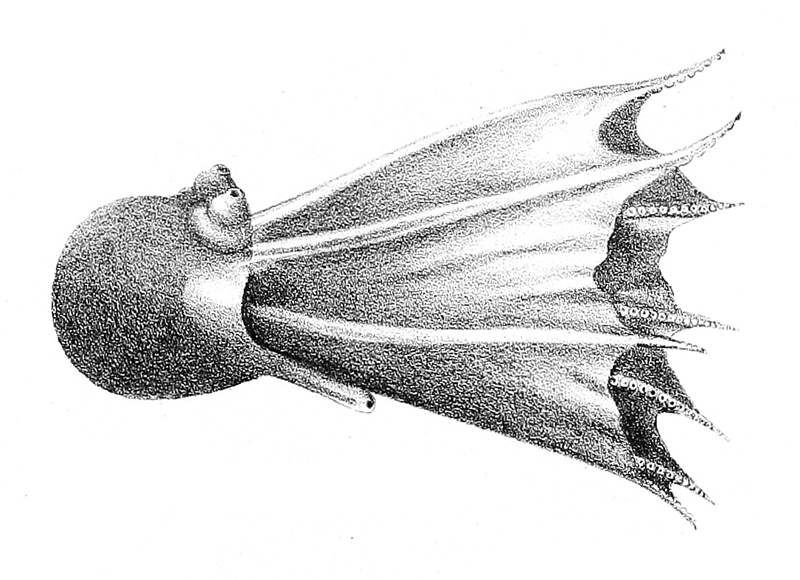
- Amphitretus pelagicus

Scientific classification
- Kingdom: Animalia
- Phylum: Mollusca
- Class: Cephalopoda
- Order: Octopoda
- Superfamily: Octopodoidea
- Family: Amphitretidae; Hoyle, 1885

Subfamilies
- Amphitretinae; Bolitaeninae; Vitreledonellinae

= Amphitretidae =

Family of octopuses

Amphitretidae is a family of mesopelagic octopods which contains three subfamilies, formerly classified as families in their own right. It is classified in the superfamily Octopodoidea. Species in the family Amphipetridae are characterised by having a single row of suckers on each arm (uniserial suckers), a gelatinous body and non hemispherical eyes.

== Taxonomy ==
There are three subfamilies within Amphipetridae:

- Subfamily Amphitretinae Hoyle, 1886
  - Genus Amphitretus Hoyle, 1885
- Subfamily Bolitaeninae Chun, 1911
  - Genus Bolitaena Steenstrup, 1859
  - Genus Japetella Hoyle, 1885
  - Genus Dorsopsis Thore, 1949 (taxon inquirendum)
- Subfamily Vitreledonellinae Robson, 1932
  - Genus Vitreledonella Joubin, 1918
