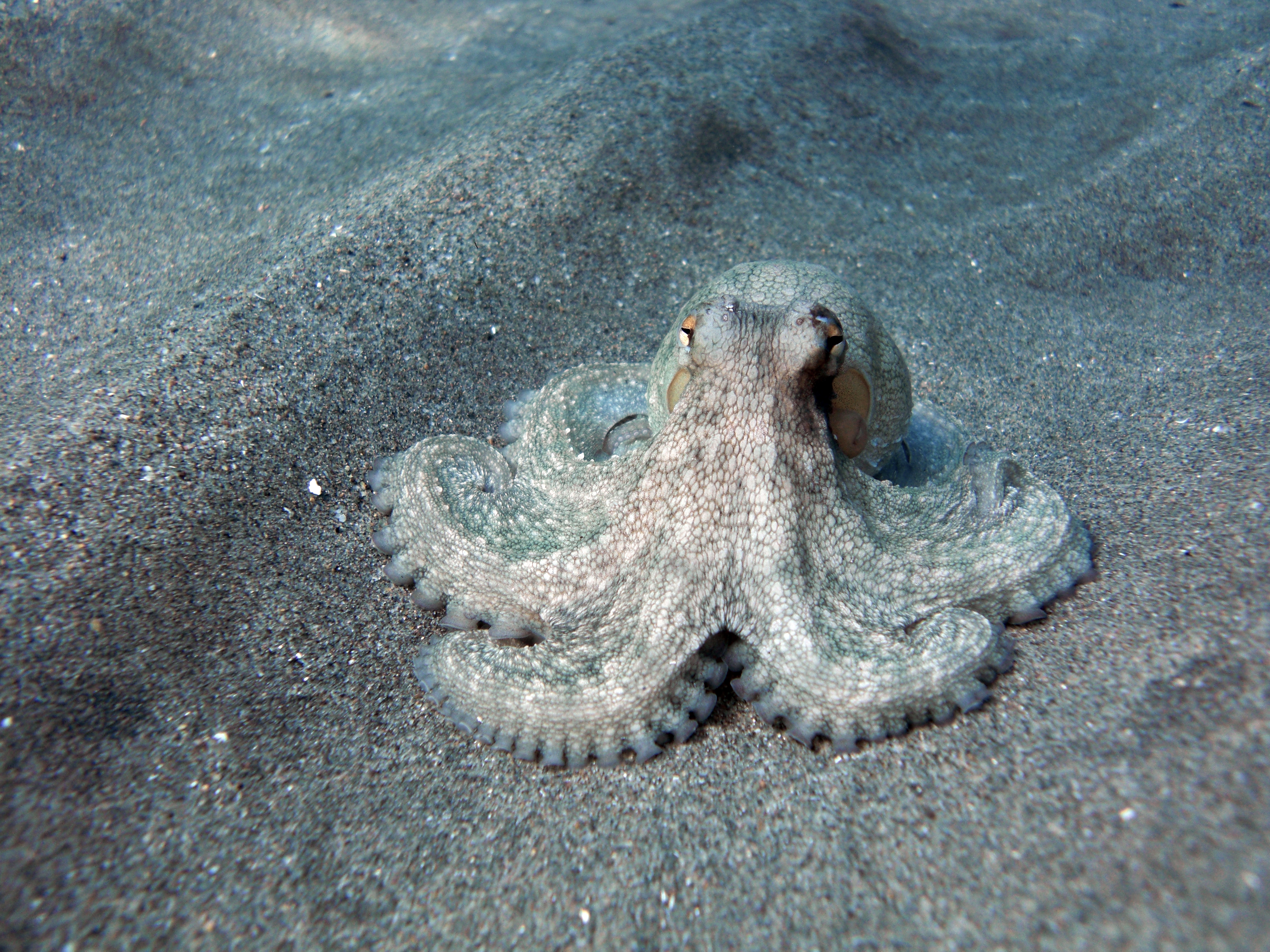
- Octopus vulgaris

Scientific classification
- Kingdom: Animalia
- Phylum: Mollusca
- Class: Cephalopoda
- Order: Octopoda
- Family: Octopodidae
- Subfamily: Octopodinae
- Genus: Octopus; Cuvier, 1797

Type species
- Octopus vulgaris Cuvier, 1797

Species
- Over 100, see text.

= Octopus (genus) =

Genus of cephalopods

Octopus is the largest genus of octopuses, comprising about 100 species. These species are widespread throughout the world's oceans. Many species formerly placed in the genus Octopus are now assigned to other genera within the family.

== Species ==
- Octopus alecto Berry, 1953
- Octopus argus Krauss, 1848
- Octopus australis Hoyle, 1885 – hammer octopus
- Octopus balboai Voss, 1971
- Octopus berenice Gray, 1849
- Octopus berrima Stanks & Norman, 1992 – southern keeled octopus
- Octopus bimaculatus Verrill, 1883 – California two-spot octopus or Verrill's two-spot octopus
- Octopus bimaculoides Pickford & McConnaughey, 1949 – California two-spot octopus
- Octopus bocki Adam, 1941 – Bock's pygmy octopus
- Octopus briareus Robson, 1929 – Caribbean reef octopus
- Octopus bulbus Norman, 2001
- Octopus californicus Berry, 1911 – North Pacific bigeye octopus
- Octopus chierchiae Jatta, 1889 – lesser Pacific striped octopus
- Octopus conispadiceus Sasaki, 1917 – chestnut octopus
- Octopus cyanea Gray, 1849 – big blue octopus or day octopus
- Octopus diminutus Kaneko & Kubodera, 2008
- Octopus djinda Amor, 2021
- Octopus favonius Gray, 1849
- Octopus filosus Howell, 1867
- Octopus fitchi Berry, 1953 – Fitch's pygmy octopus
- Octopus gardineri Hoyle, 1905
- Octopus gorgonus Huffard, 2007
- Octopus harpedon Norman, 2001
- Octopus hattai Sasaki, 1929
- Octopus hawaiiensis Eydoux & Souleyet, 1852 - Hawaiian octopus
- Octopus hubbsorum Berry, 1953 – Hubb's octopus
- Octopus humilis Huffard, 2007
- Octopus hummelincki Adam, 1936 – bumblebee two-spot octopus or Caribbean two-spot octopus
- Octopus huttoni Benham, 1943
- Octopus incella Kaneko & Kubodera, 2007
- Octopus insularis Leite & Haimovici, 2008
- Octopus jeraldi Pratt, Baldwin & Vecchione, 2020
- Octopus joubini Robson, 1929 - Atlantic pygmy octopus or small-egg Caribbean pygmy octopus
- Octopus kaharoa O'Shea, 1999
- Octopus kaurna Stranks, 1990 – southern sand octopus
- Octopus laqueus Kaneko & Kubodera, 2005
- Octopus mariles Huffard, 2007
- Octopus maya Voss & Solís, 1966 – Mexican four-eyed octopus
- Octopus mercatoris Adam, 1937 - Caribbean dwarf octopus
- Octopus mernoo O'Shea, 1999
- Octopus microphthalmus Goodrich, 1896
- Octopus micropyrsus Berry, 1953 – California Lilliput octopus
- Octopus micros Norman, 2001
- Octopus mimus Gould, 1852 - Gould octopus
- Octopus mutilans Taki, 1942
- Octopus nanus Adam, 1973
- Octopus occidentalis Steenstrup in Hoyle, 1885
- Octopus oculifer Hoyle, 1904 – Galapagos reef octopus
- Octopus oliveri Berry, 1914
- Octopus pallidus Hoyle, 1885 – pale octopus
- Octopus parvus Sasaki, 1917 – Japanese pygmy octopus
- Octopus penicillifer Berry, 1954
- Octopus pentherinus Rochebrune & Mabille, 1889 (nomen dubium)
- Octopus pumilus Norman & Sweeney, 1997
- Octopus pyrum Norman, Hochberg & Lu, 1997
- Octopus rubescens Berry, 1953 – East Pacific red octopus
- Octopus salutii Vérany, 1836 – spider octopus
- Octopus sanctaehelenae Robson, 1929
- Octopus selene Voss, 1971 – moon octopus
- Octopus sinensis d'Orbigny, 1841 - East Asian Common octopus
- Octopus stictochrus Voss, 1971
- Octopus superciliosus Quoy & Gaimard, 1832frilled pygmy octopus
- Octopus tehuelchus d'Orbigny, 1834 – Tehuelche or Patagonian octopus
- Octopus tenebricus Smith, 1884
- Octopus tetricus Gould, 1852 – gloomy octopus or common Sydney octopus
- Octopus veligero Berry, 1953 – veiled octopus
- Octopus verrucosus Hoyle, 1885
- Octopus vitiensis Hoyle, 1885 – bighead octopus
- Octopus vulgaris Cuvier, 1797 – common octopus
- Octopus warringa Stranks, 1990 – club pygmy octopus
- Octopus wolfi Wülker, 1913 – star-sucker pygmy octopus
- Octopus zonatus Voss, 1968 – Atlantic banded octopus

The following species are species inquirenda; species needing further investigation and redescription to determine whether they belong within this genus. The species listed with an asterisk (*) are questionable and need further study to determine if they are valid species or synonyms;

- Octopus alatus Sasaki, 1920
- Octopus araneoides * Iw. Taki, 1964
- Octopus arborescens Hoyle, 1904
- Octopus filamentosus Blainville, 1826
- Octopus fujitai Sasaki, 1929
- Octopus globosus Appellöf, 1886 – globe octopus
- Octopus hongkongensis Hoyle, 1885
- Octopus longispadiceus Sasaki, 1917
- Octopus minor Sasaki, 1920
- Octopus nanhaiensis Dong, 1976
- Octopus niveus Lesson, 1831
- Octopus ochotensis Sasaki, 1920
- Octopus oshimai Sasaki, 1929
- Octopus prashadi Adam, 1939
- Octopus pricei * Berry, 1913
- Octopus sasakii Taki, 1942
- Octopus spinosus Sasaki, 1920
- Octopus tsugarensis Sasaki, 1920
- Octopus validus Sasaki, 1920
- Octopus yendoi Sasaki, 1920

Species brought into synonymy

List of synonyms in the genus Octopus
- Octopus abaculus Norman & Sweeney, 1997: synonym of Abdopus abaculus (Norman & Sweeney, 1997)
- Octopus aculeatus d'Orbigny, 1834: synonym of Abdopus aculeatus (d'Orbigny, 1834)
- Octopus adamsi Benham, 1944 : synonym of Octopus huttoni Benham, 1943
- Octopus aegina Gray, 1849: synonym of Amphioctopus aegina (Gray, 1849)
- Octopus albus Rafinesque, 1814: synonym of Octopus vulgaris Cuvier, 1797
- Octopus alderii Vérany, 1851: synonym of Pinnoctopus macropus (Risso, 1826)
- Octopus alpheus, Capricorn night octopus: synonym of Pinnoctopus alpheus (Norman, 1993)
- Octopus alpheus Norman, 1993: synonym of Oinnoctopus alpheus (Norman, 1993)
- Octopus americanus Froriep, 1806: synonym of Octopus vulgaris Cuvier, 1797
- Octopus apollyon (S. S. Berry, 1912): synonym of Enteroctopus dofleini (Wülker, 1910)
- Octopus arcticus Prosch, 1849: synonym of Bathypolypus arcticus (Prosch, 1849)
- Octopus areolatus de Haan, 1839: synonym of Amphioctopus fangsiao (d'Orbigny, 1839)
- Octopus aspilosomatis Norman, 1993, plain-body night octopus: synonym of Pinnoctopus aspilosomatis (Norman, 1993)
- Octopus bairdii Verrill, 1873: synonym of Bathypolypus bairdii (Verrill, 1873)
- Octopus bakerii d'Orbigny, 1826: synonym of Octopus americanus Montfort, 1802: synonym of Octopus vulgaris Cuvier, 1797
- Octopus bermudensis Hoyle, 1885: synonym of Callistoctopus furvus (Gould, 1852)
- Octopus bitentaculatus Risso, 1854: synonym of Octopus vulgaris Cuvier, 1797
- Octopus brevitentaculatus Blainville, 1826: synonym of Octopus vulgaris Cuvier, 1797
- Octopus brocki Ortmann, 1888: synonym of Amphioctopus fangsiao (d'Orbigny, 1839)
- Octopus bunurong Stranks, 1990: synonym of Callistoctopus bunurong (Stranks, 1990) – southern white-spot octopus
- Octopus burryi Voss, 1950: synonym of Amphioctopus burryi (Voss, 1950)
- Octopus carolinensis Verrill, 1884: synonym of Amphioctopus carolinensis (Verrill, 1884), Carolinian octopus
- Octopus cassiopea Gray, 1849: synonym of Octopus vulgaris Cuvier, 1797
- Octopus cassiopeia Gray, 1849 (incorrect subsequent spelling of specific epithet): synonym of Octopus vulgaris Cuvier, 1797
- Octopus catenulatus Philippi, 1844: synonym of Ocythoe tuberculata Rafinesque, 1814
- Octopus chromatus Heilprin, 1888: synonym of Callistoctopus furvus (Gould, 1852)
- Octopus cirrhosus Lamarck, 1798: synonym of Eledone cirrhosa (Lamarck, 1798)
- Octopus cocco Risso, 1854: synonym of Scaeurgus unicirrhus (Delle Chiaje [in de Férussac & d'Orbigny], 1841)
- Octopus cocco Vérany, 1846: synonym of Pteroctopus tetracirrhus (Delle Chiaje, 1830)
- Octopus coerulescentes Fra Piero, 1895: synonym of Octopus vulgaris Cuvier, 1797
- Octopus communis Park, 1885: synonym of Macroctopus maorum (Hutton, 1880)
- Octopus cuvieri d'Orbigny, 1826: synonym of Callistoctopus lechenaultii (d'Orbigny, 1826)
- Octopus dana Robson, 1929: synonym of Macrotritopus defilippi (Vérany, 1851)
- Octopus defilippi Vérany, 1851: synonym of Macrotritopus defilippi (Vérany, 1851) Atlantic longarm octopus or Lilliput longarm octopus
- Octopus didynamus Rafinesque, 1814: synonym of Pinnoctopus macropus (Risso, 1826)
- Octopus dierythraeus Norman, 1992: synonym of Pinnoctopus dierythraeus (Norman, 1992) – red-spot night octopus
- Octopus digueti Perrier & Rochebrune, 1894: synonym of Paroctopus digueti (Perrier & Rochebrune, 1894) – Diguet's pygmy octopus
- Octopus dofleini (Wülker, 1910): synonym of Enteroctopus dofleini (Wülker, 1910)
- Octopus dollfusi Robson, 1928: synonym of Amphioctopus aegina (Gray, 1849)
- Octopus duplex Hoyle, 1885: synonym of Octopus superciliosus Quoy & Gaimard, 1832
- Octopus equivocus Robson, 1929: synonym of Macrotritopus defilippi (Vérany, 1851)
- Octopus ergasticus P. Fischer & H. Fischer, 1892: synonym of Bathypolypus ergasticus (P. Fischer & H. Fischer, 1892)
- Octopus eudora Gray, 1849: synonym of Octopus americanus Montfort, 1802: synonym of Octopus vulgaris Cuvier, 1797
- Octopus exannulatus Norman, 1992: synonym of Amphioctopus exannulatus (Norman, 1992)
- Octopus fangsiao d'Orbigny, 1839: synonym of Amphioctopus fangsiao (d'Orbigny, 1839)
- Octopus fasciatus Hoyle, 1886: synonym of Hapalochlaena fasciata (Hoyle, 1886)
- Octopus fimbriatus d'Orbigny, 1841: synonym of Abdopus horridus (d'Orbigny, 1826)
- Octopus flindersi Cotton, 1932: synonym of Macroctopus maorum (Hutton, 1880)
- Octopus fontanianus d'Orbigny, 1834: synonym of Robsonella fontaniana (d'Orbigny, 1834)
- Octopus frayedus Rafinesque, 1814: synonym of Pinnoctopus macropus (Risso, 1826)
- Octopus furvus Gould, 1852: synonym of Callistoctopus furvus (Gould, 1852)
- Octopus geryonea Gray, 1849: synonym of Octopus americanus Montfort, 1802: synonym of Octopus vulgaris Cuvier, 1797
- Octopus gibbsi O'Shea, 1999: synonym of Octopus tetricus Gould, 1852
- Octopus gilbertianus Berry, 1912: synonym of Enteroctopus dofleini (Wülker, 1910)
- Octopus glaber Wülker, 1920: synonym of Octopus cyanea Gray, 1849
- Octopus gracilis Verrill, 1884: synonym of Macrotritopus equivocus (Robson, 1929)
- Octopus gracilis Eydoux & Souleyet, 1852: synonym of Tremoctopus gracilis (Eydoux & Souleyet, 1852)
- Octopus granosus Blainville, 1826: synonym of Pinnoctopus macropus (Risso, 1826)
- Octopus granulatus Lamarck, 1799: synonym of Amphioctopus granulatus (Lamarck, 1799)
- Octopus graptus Norman, 1992: synonym of Pinnoctopus graptus (Norman, 1992) – scribbled night octopus
- Octopus groenlandicus Steenstrup, 1856: synonym of Bathypolypus arcticus (Prosch, 1849)
- Octopus guangdongensis Dong, 1976: synonym of Abdopus guangdongensis (Dong, 1976)
- Octopus hardwickei Gray, 1849: synonym of Amphioctopus aegina (Gray, 1849)
- Octopus harmandi Rochebrune, 1882: synonym of Abdopus aculeatus (d'Orbigny, 1834)
- Octopus herdmani Hoyle, 1904: synonym of Octopus cyanea Gray, 1849
- Octopus heteropus Rafinesque, 1814: synonym of Octopus vulgaris Cuvier, 1797
- Octopus horridus d'Orbigny, 1826: synonym of Abdopus horridus (d'Orbigny, 1826)
- Octopus horsti Joubin, 1898: synonym of Octopus cyanea Gray, 1849
- Octopus hoylei (S. S. Berry, 1909): synonym of Pteroctopus hoylei (S. S. Berry, 1909)
- Octopus indicus Rapp, 1835: synonym of Cistopus indicus (Rapp, 1835)
- Octopus januarii Hoyle, 1885: synonym of Muusoctopus januarii (Hoyle, 1885)
- Octopus kagoshimensis Ortmann, 1888: synonym of Amphioctopus kagoshimensis (Ortmann, 1888)
- Octopus kempi Robson, 1929: synonym of Macrotritopus defilippi (Vérany, 1851)
- Octopus kermadecensis (Berry, 1914): synonym of Pinnoctopus kermadecensis (Berry, 1914)
- Octopus koellikeri Vérany, 1851: synonym of Tremoctopus violaceus delle Chiaje, 1830
- Octopus lechenaultii d'Orbigny, 1826: synonym of Callistoctopus lechenaultii (d'Orbigny, 1826)
- Octopus leioderma (Berry, 1911): synonym of Benthoctopus leioderma (Berry, 1911)
- Octopus lentus Verrill, 1880: synonym of Bathypolypus bairdii (Verrill, 1873)
- Octopus leschenaultii d'Orbigny, 1826: synonym of Callistoctopus lechenaultii (d'Orbigny, 1826)
- Octopus leucoderma San Giovanni, 1829: synonym of Eledone leucoderma (San Giovanni, 1829)
- Octopus lobensis Castellanos & Menni, 1969: synonym of Octopus tehuelchus d'Orbigny, 1834 – lobed octopus
- Octopus lothei Chun, 1913: synonym of Bathypolypus ergasticus (P. Fischer & H. Fischer, 1892)
- Octopus lunulatus Quoy & Gaimard, 1832: synonym of Hapalochlaena lunulata (Quoy & Gaimard, 1832)
- Octopus luteus (Sasaki, 1929): synonym of Callistoctopus luteus (Sasaki, 1929) – starry night octopus
- Octopus macropodus Sangiovanni, 1829: synonym of Pinnoctopus macropus (Risso, 1826)
- Octopus macropus Risso, 1826: synonym of Pinnoctopus macropus (Risso, 1826) – Atlantic white-spotted octopus
- Octopus maculatus Rafinesque, 1814: synonym of Octopus vulgaris Cuvier, 1797
- Octopus maculosus Hoyle, 1883: synonym of Hapalochlaena maculosa (Hoyle, 1883)
- Octopus magnificus Villanueva, Sanchez & Compagno, 1992: synonym of Enteroctopus magnificus (Villanueva, Sanchez & Compagno, 1992)
- Octopus maorum Hutton, 1880: synonym of Macroctopus maorum (Hutton, 1880) – Maori octopus
- Octopus marginatus Taki, 1964: synonym of Amphioctopus marginatus (Iw. Taki, 1964)
- Octopus marmoratus Hoyle, 1885: synonym of Octopus cyanea Gray, 1849
- Octopus membranaceus Quoy & Gaimard, 1832: synonym of Amphioctopus membranaceus (Quoy & Gaimard, 1832)
- Octopus microstomus Reynaud, 1830: synonym of Tremoctopus violaceus delle Chiaje, 1830
- Octopus moschatus Rafinesque, 1814: synonym of Octopus vulgaris Cuvier, 1797
- Octopus moschatus Lamarck, 1798: synonym of Eledone moschata (Lamarck, 1798)
- Octopus mototi Norman, 1992: synonym of Amphioctopus mototi (Norman, 1992)
- Octopus neglectus Nateewathana & Norman, 1999: synonym of Amphioctopus neglectus (Nateewathana & Norman, 1999)
- Octopus nierstraszi W. Adam, 1938: synonym of Hapalochlaena nierstraszi (W. Adam, 1938)
- Octopus nierstrazi [sic]: synonym of Octopus nierstraszi W. Adam, 1938: synonym of Hapalochlaena nierstraszi (W. Adam, 1938)
- Octopus niger Risso, 1854: synonym of Octopus vulgaris Cuvier, 1797
- Octopus niger Rafinesque, 1814: synonym of Octopus vulgaris Cuvier, 1797
- Octopus nocturnus Norman & Sweeney, 1997: synonym of Callistoctopus nocturnus (Norman & Sweeney, 1997)
- Octopus obesus Verrill, 1880: synonym of Bathypolypus bairdii (Verrill, 1873)
- Octopus ocellatus Gray, 1849: synonym of Amphioctopus fangsiao (d'Orbigny, 1839)
- Octopus octopodia Tryon, 1879: synonym of Octopus vulgaris Cuvier, 1797
- Octopus ornatus Gould, 1852: synonym of Pinnoctopus ornatus (Gould, 1852) – ornate octopus or white-striped octopus
- Octopus ovulum Sasaki, 191: synonym of Amphioctopus ovulum (Sasaki, 1917)
- Octopus rapanui Voss, 1979: synonym of Callistoctopus rapanui (Voss, 1979)
- Octopus patagonicus Lönnberg, 1898: synonym of Enteroctopus megalocyathus (Gould, 1852)
- Octopus pictus Brock, 1882: synonym of Hapalochlaena fasciata (Hoyle, 1886)
- Octopus pictus Verrill, 1883: synonym of Octopus verrilli Hoyle, 1886
- Octopus pilosus Risso, 1826: synonym of Octopus vulgaris Cuvier, 1797
- Octopus piscatorum Verrill, 1879: synonym of Bathypolypus bairdii (Verrill, 1873)
- Octopus polyzenia Gray, 1849: synonym of Amphioctopus polyzenia (Gray, 1849)
- Octopus punctatus Gabb, 1862: synonym of Enteroctopus dofleini (Wülker, 1910)
- Octopus pustulosus Sasaki, 1920: synonym of Octopus madokai Berry, 1921
- Octopus rabassin Risso, 1854: synonym of Octopus vulgaris Cuvier, 1797
- Octopus reticularis Petangna, 1828: synonym of Ocythoe tuberculata Rafinesque, 1814
- Octopus rex Nateewathana & Norman, 1999: synonym of Amphioctopus rex (Nateewathana & Norman, 1999)
- Octopus robsoni Adam, 1941: synonym of Amphioctopus robsoni (Adam, 1941)
- Octopus robustus Brock, 1887: synonym of Hapalochlaena fasciata (Hoyle, 1886)
- Octopus roosevelti Stuart, 1941: synonym of Octopus oculifer Hoyle, 1904
- Octopus ruber Rafinesque, 1814: synonym of Octopus vulgaris Cuvier, 1797
- Octopus rufus Risso, 1854: synonym of Scaeurgus unicirrhus (Delle Chiaje [in de Férussac & d'Orbigny], 1841)
- Octopus salebrosus Sasaki, 1920: synonym of Sasakiopus salebrosus (Sasaki, 1920)
- Octopus saluzzii Naef, 1923: synonym of Octopus salutii Vérany, 1836
- Octopus saluzzii Vérany, 1840: synonym of Octopus salutii Vérany, 1836
- Octopus scorpio (Berry, 1920): synonym of Macrotritopus defilippi (Vérany, 1851)
- Octopus semipalmatus Owen, 1836: synonym of Tremoctopus violaceus delle Chiaje, 1830
- Octopus siamensis Nateewathana & Norman, 1999: synonym of Amphioctopus siamensis (Nateewathana & Norman, 1999)
- Octopus smedleyi Robson, 1932: synonym of Amphioctopus aegina (Gray, 1849)
- Octopus sponsalis Fischer & Fischer, 1892: synonym of Bathypolypus sponsalis (P. Fischer & H. Fischer, 1892)
- Octopus striolatus Dong, 1976: synonym of Amphioctopus marginatus (Iw. Taki, 1964)
- Octopus taprobanensis Robson, 1926: synonym of Callistoctopus taprobanensis (Robson, 1926)
- Octopus tenuicirrus Sasaki, 1929: synonym of Octopus hongkongensis Hoyle, 1885
- Octopus tetracirrhus Delle Chiaje, 1830: synonym of Pteroctopus tetracirrhus (Delle Chiaje, 1830)
- Octopus tetradynamus Rafinesque, 1814: synonym of Octopus vulgaris Cuvier, 1797
- Octopus titanotus Troschel, 1857: synonym of Pteroctopus tetracirrhus (Delle Chiaje, 1830)
- Octopus tonganus Hoyle, 1885: synonym of Abdopus tonganus (Hoyle, 1885)
- Octopus tritentaculatus Risso, 1854: synonym of Octopus vulgaris Cuvier, 1797
- Octopus troscheli Targioni-Tozzetti, 1869: synonym of Octopus vulgaris Cuvier, 1797
- Octopus troschelii Targioni-Tozzetti, 1869: synonym of Octopus vulgaris Cuvier, 1797
- Octopus tuberculatus Risso, 1854: synonym of Ocythoe tuberculata Rafinesque, 1814
- Octopus tuberculatus Targioni-Tozzetti, 1869: synonym of Octopus vulgaris Cuvier, 1797
- Octopus tuberculatus de Blainville, 1826: synonym of Octopus vulgaris Cuvier, 1797
- Octopus unicirrhus Delle Chiaje [in de Férussac & d'Orbigny], 1841: synonym of Scaeurgus unicirrhus (Delle Chiaje [in de Férussac & d'Orbigny], 1841)
- Octopus varunae Oommen, 1971: synonym of Amphioctopus varunae (Oommen, 1971)
- Octopus velatus Rang, 1837: synonym of Tremoctopus violaceus delle Chiaje, 1830
- Octopus velifer de Férussac, 1835: synonym of Tremoctopus violaceus delle Chiaje, 1830
- Octopus veranyi Wagner, 1829: synonym of Ocythoe tuberculata Rafinesque, 1814
- Octopus vincenti Pickford, 1955: synonym of Amphioctopus burryi (Voss, 1950)
- Octopus violaceus Risso, 1854: synonym of Ocythoe tuberculata Rafinesque, 1814
- Octopus westerniensis d'Orbigny, 1834: synonym of Octopus superciliosus Quoy & Gaimard, 1832
- Octopus winckworthi Robson, 1926: synonym of Macrochlaena winckworthi (Robson, 1926)

The following is part of a maximum likelihood phylogenetic tree based on 13 protein-coding genes partitioned by codon, and nodes with less than 70% bootstrap support are collapsed, forming polytomies. As depicted here, genus Octopus (○) is polyphyletic:

- - Megaleledonidae
  - Amphitretidae
- Bathypolypodidae
- Enteroctopodidae
  - Muusoctopus johnsonianus
  - Octopus conispadiceus ○
- - - Argonautidae
    - Tremoctopodidae
  - Octopodidae
    - - - Octopus variabilis ○
        - Octopus minor ○
      - Callistoctopus luteus
    - - Octopus fitchi ○
      - - Octopus cyanea ○
        - - - Amphioctopus fangsiao
            - - Amphioctopus aegina
              - - Amphioctopus neglectus
                - Amphioctopus marginatus
          - - Cistoctopus chinensis
            - Cistoctopus taiwanicus
          - - Octopus vulgaris ○
            - - Octopus mimus ○
              - - Octopus bimaculatus ○
                - Octopus bimaculoides ○
