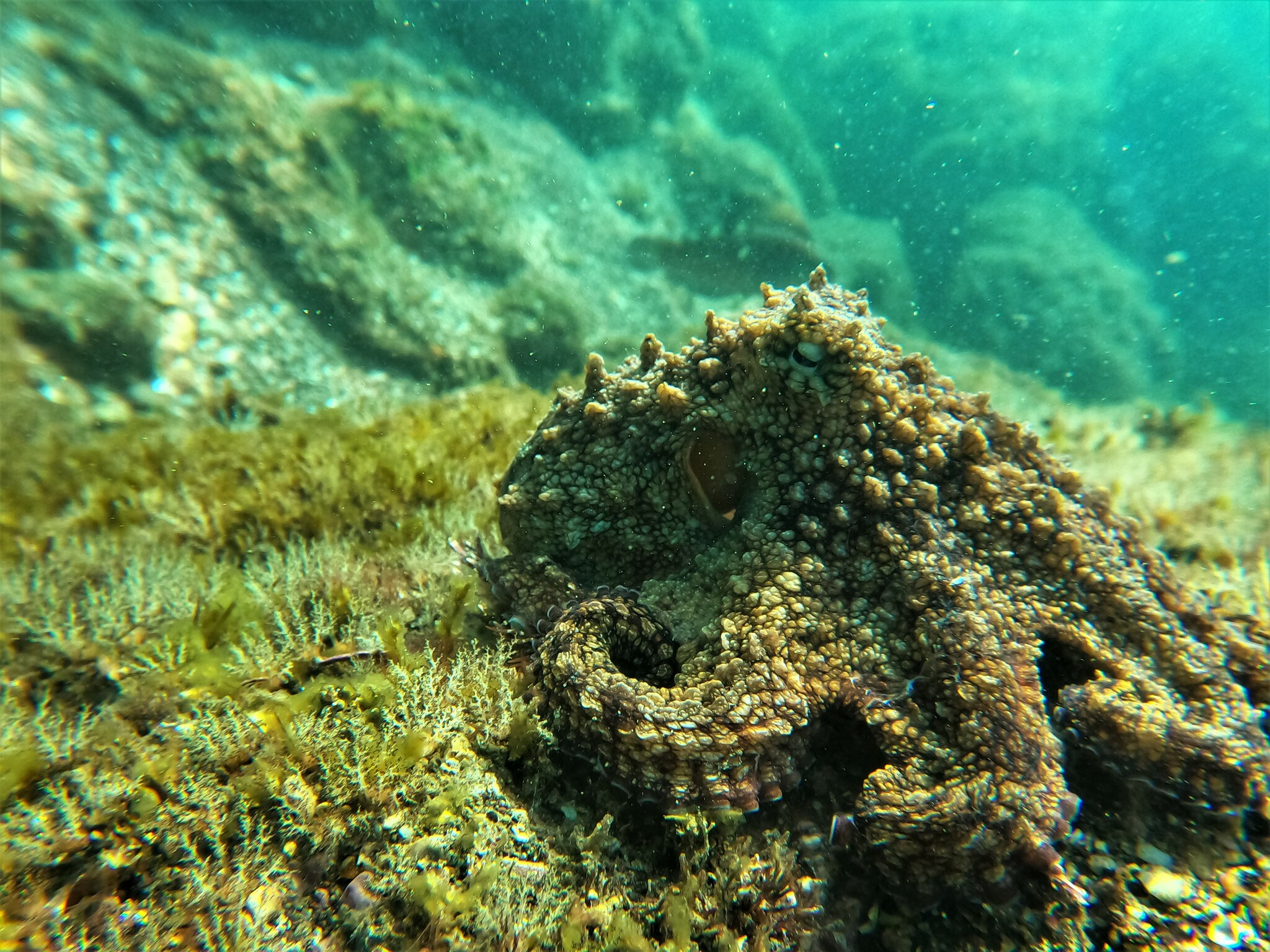
- Manzanillo, Colima, Mexico, 2023

Conservation status
- Least Concern (IUCN 3.1)

Scientific classification
- Kingdom: Animalia
- Phylum: Mollusca
- Class: Cephalopoda
- Order: Octopoda
- Family: Octopodidae
- Genus: Octopus
- Species: O. hubbsorum

Binomial name
- Octopus hubbsorum S. S. Berry, 1953

= Octopus hubbsorum =

Species of Octopus

Octopus hubbsorum (also known as Hubb's octopus), is an octopus in the family Octopodidae. It is commonly found along tropical waters along the central Pacific Coast of Mexico. Here, they are one of the most commonly caught cephalopods and are commercially extremely important for the economy.

== Ecology ==
=== General ===
O. hubbsorum is a benthic free-swimming octopus commonly found in intertidal and shallow subtidal zones of the Mexico pacific. Typically, they are found hiding in small places along coral reefs in shallow waters. Additionally, they do not stay in one area, rather they display seasonal movement due to changes in diet patterns. The typical mantle length is medium sized at 220 mm (8.7 in) with an average weight of 766.6 g (27.04 oz). It has been found that there is a continuous mature population, which can be accredited to the warmer waters they live in. Additionally, mature males were typically smaller than mature females. The species was noticed to have no ocelli. Some other physical characteristics include a rounded mantle shape, individually enlarged proximal suckers in males and females, and tapered arms.

=== Diet ===
O. hubbsorum, like all other octopods, display carnivorous tendencies. Their diet, however, varies throughout their lifespan. The typical diet of mature individuals is rather broad when compared to the diet of juveniles. One study found that O. hubbsorum feeds on 50 different types of prey. There is a notable difference between the diets of mature males and females. This is seen in other species of octopuses and is most likely due to the fact that female octopuses are more metabolically taxed when reproducing. These reproducing females are noticed to ingest organisms that are not frequently ingested by others, most likely due to the need to stay close to the nest and just eating what is available. Senscent females (post reproduction) when monitored, were more likely to have empty stomachs when caught when compared to males of the same age. This similar behaviour is seen in the species O. mimus and is accredited to the fact that females undergo hormonal changes at this point in their lives that ultimately alter their diet. Overall, crustaceans make up the majority of both male and female diets. However, they also have been found to eat mollusks and fishes as well as echinoderms, chaetognaths, siphonophores, and polychaetes. Overall, feeding patterns vary according to time of year, sex, and with maturation. As for their hunting strategy, they are thought to hunt at night, as octopods caught in the morning in one study had full stomachs.

== Reproduction ==
O. hubbsorum spawns with synchronous ovulation, where egg laying is followed by the animal's death (simultaneous terminal spawning). During this period, there is a lack of oocyte maturation. The eggs are cared for by the mother and are laid in a cave or a den. The growth and feeding habits of the female slows during the spawning period as her energy goes to caring for the eggs. Overall, it was found that female O. hubbsorum have low fecundity. Additionally, females are found to have smaller oocytes. Mating can either be performed with one or many males present.

=== Double hectocotylization ===
A study performed in the Mexican Pacific found many male octopuses to have double hectocotylization (Mariana Díaz-Santana-Iturrios et al, 2019). It is ubiquitous for male octopodes to possess a hectocotylus, which is a modified arm with a characteristic ventral groove. This arm contains an aboral ligula and an oral calamus. These structures are responsible for releasing and transferring the spermatophore. The above mentioned study found that the double hectocotylization is mostly non bilateral, meaning that they are not in the same pair of arms. The additional hectocotylus does not contain ligula. Because of this, it is characterized as an accessory hectocotylus and is still used in the mating ritual, but not directly in copulation. It is also thought that the presence of the second hectocotylus is a product of sexual selection, due to the tendency of O. hubbsorum to congregate in large groups. The current thought is that double hectocotylization acts as a visual signal for mating as opposed to the commonly practiced chemical signals for mating.

== Development ==
The embryonic development of O. hubbsorum is like that of many other cephalopods. Females produce large clutch sizes with small eggs, which is most likely due to the ability to invest little care and energy for each individual egg. As for the structure of the egg itself, a pear shaped chorion and long chorion stalk envelope and tether the egg, respectively. The eggs are off white in color with an average length of 0.9–2.4 mm (0.035–0.094 in) and the average width of 0.06–0.18 mm (0.0024–0.0071 in). The egg clusters were noticeably kept together by a green matrix. Though the study did not list the chemical makeup, it can be inferred that this is simply a secretion that allows the eggs to be held together. Chromatophores appear in stages XIV to XV according to Naef morphological descriptions, and iridocytes appear at stage XVII. Arms begin to grow at stage XIV and end up having three suckers each by the time they hatch. At stage XX, the eyes are able to move freely.

O. hubbsorum exhibits direct development. Though egg hatching was monitored in a lab, it is unknown what the source for the cause of hatching is, though it begins with contractions of the mantle. Paralarvae have a mean mantle length of 1.06–1.38 mm (0.042–0.054 in) with equal arm length. The paralarvae are not larval in nature, rather a planktonic juvenile. The species are planktonic swimmers once hatched and are able to use jet propulsion but stay near the surface. Parental care of the eggs is shown through the female ventilating, cleaning, and protecting the eggs until all have hatched. Octopods in the post embryonic stage are very high energy with keen ability to hunt. There was, however, a low survival rate of paralarvae due to the dangerous and competitive environment (María del Carmen Alejo-Plata, Sac-nicté Herrera Alejo, 2014).
