= Octopus mercatoris =

Caribbean dwarf octopus

Conservation status
- Data Deficient (IUCN 3.1)

Scientific classification
- Kingdom: Animalia
- Phylum: Mollusca
- Class: Cephalopoda
- Order: Octopoda
- Family: Octopodidae
- Genus: Octopus
- Species: O. mercatoris

Binomial name
- Octopus mercatoris Adam, 1937

Species of mollusc

Octopus mercatoris, the Caribbean dwarf octopus, is a small octopus species native to the Caribbean Sea region of the Atlantic Ocean.

Though they are common, Octopus mercatoris are rarely seen.

The Caribbean dwarf octopus is mainly nocturnal, hunting by night and staying in a cave during the day. While most octopuses are cannibalistic, O. mercatoris is less cannibalistic than other species, and is sometimes found in small groups under rocks. They eat crabs, shrimps, and small fish.

Caribbean Dwarf Octopus on Bonaire (Caribbean Netherlands) in June 2026

This species has an average lifespan of 8–10 months. Because their eggs are large, they are sometimes kept and bred as pets.
