= Octopus bocki =

Bock's pygmy octopus

Conservation status
- Data Deficient (IUCN 3.1)

Scientific classification
- Kingdom: Animalia
- Phylum: Mollusca
- Class: Cephalopoda
- Order: Octopoda
- Family: Octopodidae
- Genus: Octopus
- Species: O. bocki

Binomial name
- Octopus bocki Adam, 1941

Species of octopus

Octopus bocki is a species of octopus, which has been located near south Pacific islands such as Fiji, the Philippines, and Moorea and can be found hiding in coral rubble. They can also be referred to as the Bock's pygmy octopus. They are nocturnal and use camouflage as their primary defense against predators as well as to ambush their prey. Their typical prey are crustaceans, crabs, shrimp, and small fish and they can grow to be up to 10cm in size.

== Body plan ==
O. bocki are multicellular and bilaterally symmetrical organisms with complex auditory, visual, and nervous systems. Lens eyes are used for sight, statocysts are used for auditory information, and their nervous system contains a large brain relative to their body size. They do, however, have poor circulatory and digestive systems. Their blood pigment, hemocyanin, is inefficient at oxygen transport in comparison to the activity level of octopuses. Additionally, their digestion process can take 18-24 hours due to the secretion-absorption based cycle.

== Sex characteristics and reproduction ==
Octopus bocki show sexual dimorphism where females are larger than males. They are gonochoristic and exhibit internal fertilization through the male's hectocotylus, a modified arm that transfers spermatophores to the female's mantle cavity. The larvae then produced are planktonic and grow into benthic adults. The adults reproduce year-round and exhibit a life cycle with a juvenile, sub-adult, and adult stage.

== Defense and interaction ==
Between life stages, O. bocki experience differences in color patterns. Chromatophore pigments are less developed in juvenile and sub-adult species, resulting in less expression of pattern. However, a larger range of colors displayed does not correlate with more developed chromatophores in relation to predator interaction. Instead, the adult octopuses exhibit diversity in color and pattern due to more developed chromatophores when performing intraspecific interactions. Juveniles and adults display similar predatory defense mechanisms in terms of chromatophore use, but adults use chromatophores for advanced communication with other adult octopuses. Another response they utilize is ink release. In both interactions with other octopuses as well as with predators, they will release a mucus and ink mixture. Though the larger role of ink is unknown, it could be used to attract or repel through chemicals. Following ink release in response to predation, they will jet away and change color from a dark brown to light cream. Studies on Octopus bocki have provided evidence that the use of ink in predator reactions follows the "Blanch-Ink-Jet Maneuver" commonly described when using ink as an escape response.

== Intelligence ==
As members of the Cephalopoda, octopuses are among the most intelligent invertebrates. Their intellect is likely a result of convergent evolution with vertebrates, resulting is them having exceptionally large brains and exhibiting complex behavior. Out of the Cephalopods, which also includes squid and cuttlefish, octopuses seem to have the most complex neurology though it is not fully understood. These factors make octopuses great contenders for intelligence research as the complexity and relative size of their brains is comparable to that of vertebrates. Octopus bocki are among the species that have been used for such studies. Research on the Bock's pygmy octopus has supplied evidence for delivering and processing of pain information. When experimentally injured they learned to avoid previously preferred chambers after receiving an injury there and began to prefer a chamber where they received pain relief like a local anaesthetic. That suggests that they may experience pain rather than just respond to pain. They are in fact the only invertebrate species that has provided strong evidence for advanced cognitive processing in relation to pain.
