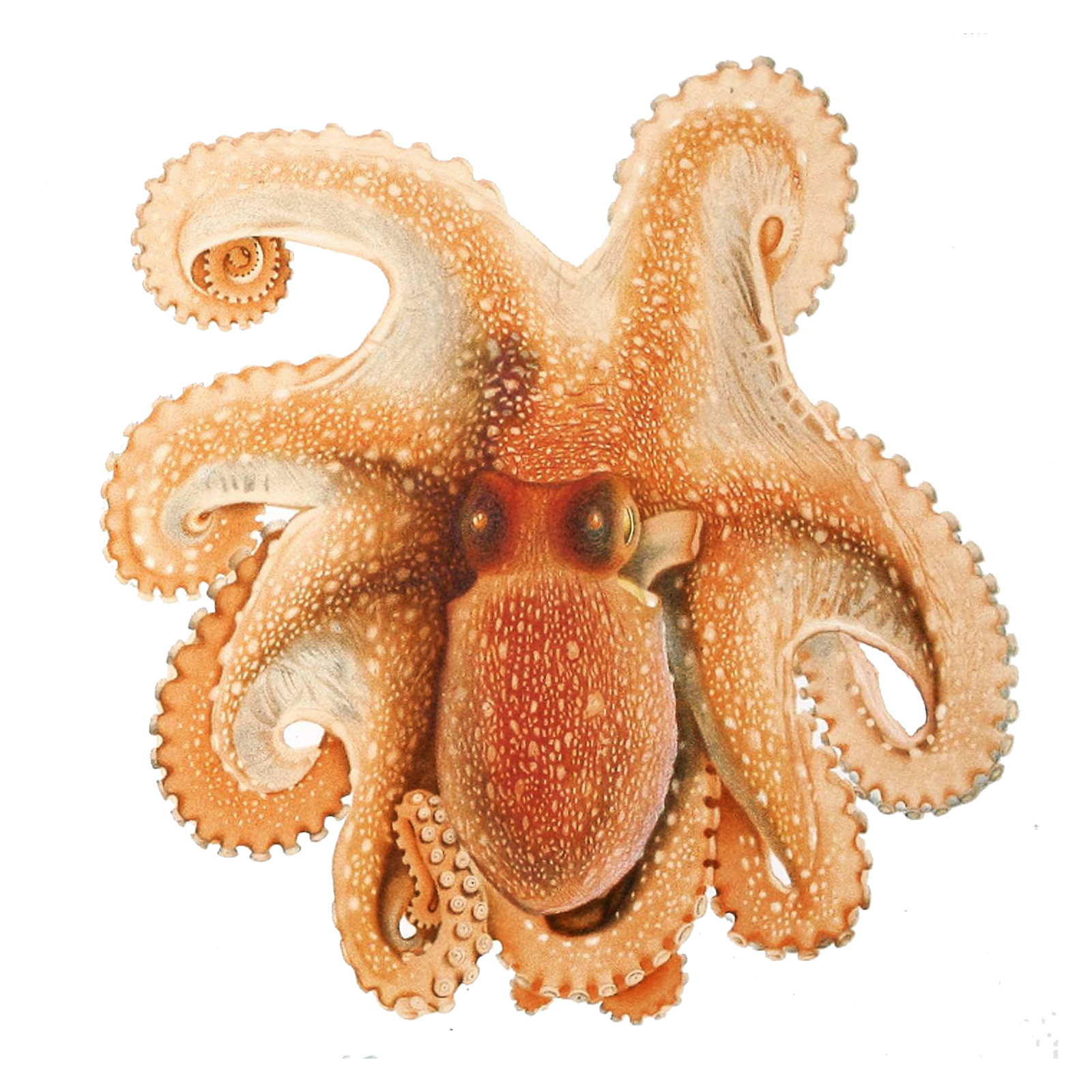

Conservation status
- Data Deficient (IUCN 3.1)

Scientific classification
- Kingdom: Animalia
- Phylum: Mollusca
- Class: Cephalopoda
- Order: Octopoda
- Family: Octopodidae
- Genus: Octopus
- Species: O. salutii

Binomial name
- Octopus salutii Vérany, 1839

= Octopus salutii =

Species of octopus

Octopus salutii or the spider octopus is a species of cephalopods in the family Octopodidae. It ranges from 4.0 to 13.0 cm ML in males and 3.5 to 16.5 cm ML in females. Octopus salutii are found at depths ranging from 100 to 700m however, they are most abundant at depths of 250 to 500m.

== Synonyms ==
- Octopus saluzzii Vérany, 1840 & Naef, 1923

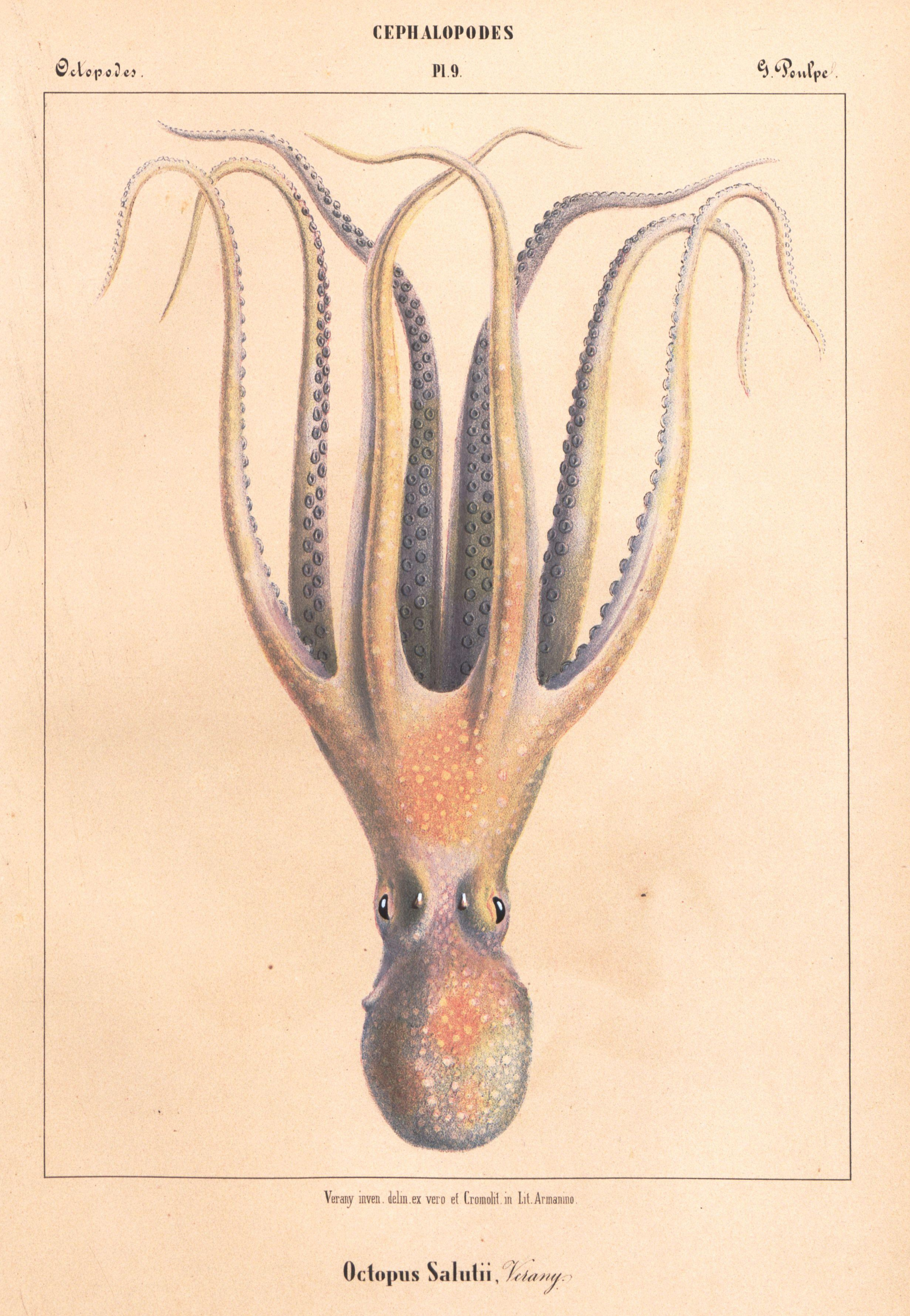
Mediterranean Sea O. salutii

== Behavior and Life History ==
Octopus salutii are marine benthic organisms that can be found in the Mediterranean Sea and Northeast Atlantic, from southern Spain to Morocco. Western Mediterranean sea salutii inhabit the lower continental shelf and the upper slope. Found between the depths of 250 to 500m. Western Mediterranean Sea juveniles inhabit inaccessible areas to avoid trawlers and use the shelfs as reproductive grounds. This species has little to no interest to the market because of its poor consistency of the mantle.

Predators - Grampus griseus, in the family Delphinidae.

Prey - Western Mediterranean Sea species stomach content included 33 different prey belonging to 3 major taxonomic groups. 87% being crustaceans, 25% being fish and 10% being cephalopods.

== Reproduction ==
Male O. salutii have a well-developed ligulae which is used to transfer sperm to the female. O. salutii lay 2,000-4,000 eggs at a time which are 5.2 to 6.0 mm long. Offspring's are planktonic for the first stage of their life. Four life cycles; egg, larva, juvenile and then adult. Males and females will die shortly after . Male usually die a few months after mating and female adults usually die shortly after hatching the eggs.

== Anatomy ==
The Biology of Octopus salutii is poorly known. This is because the species has no value to the market and is difficult to catch for research purposes. To identify the maturity of the species there are 3 stages to clear; immature (ovaries are white, small), maturing (ovaries are yellowish with granular structures), and mature (ovaries full of eggs).

== Distribution ==
- Geographical location: North Atlantic from southern Spain to Morocco, and Mediterranean Sea.
