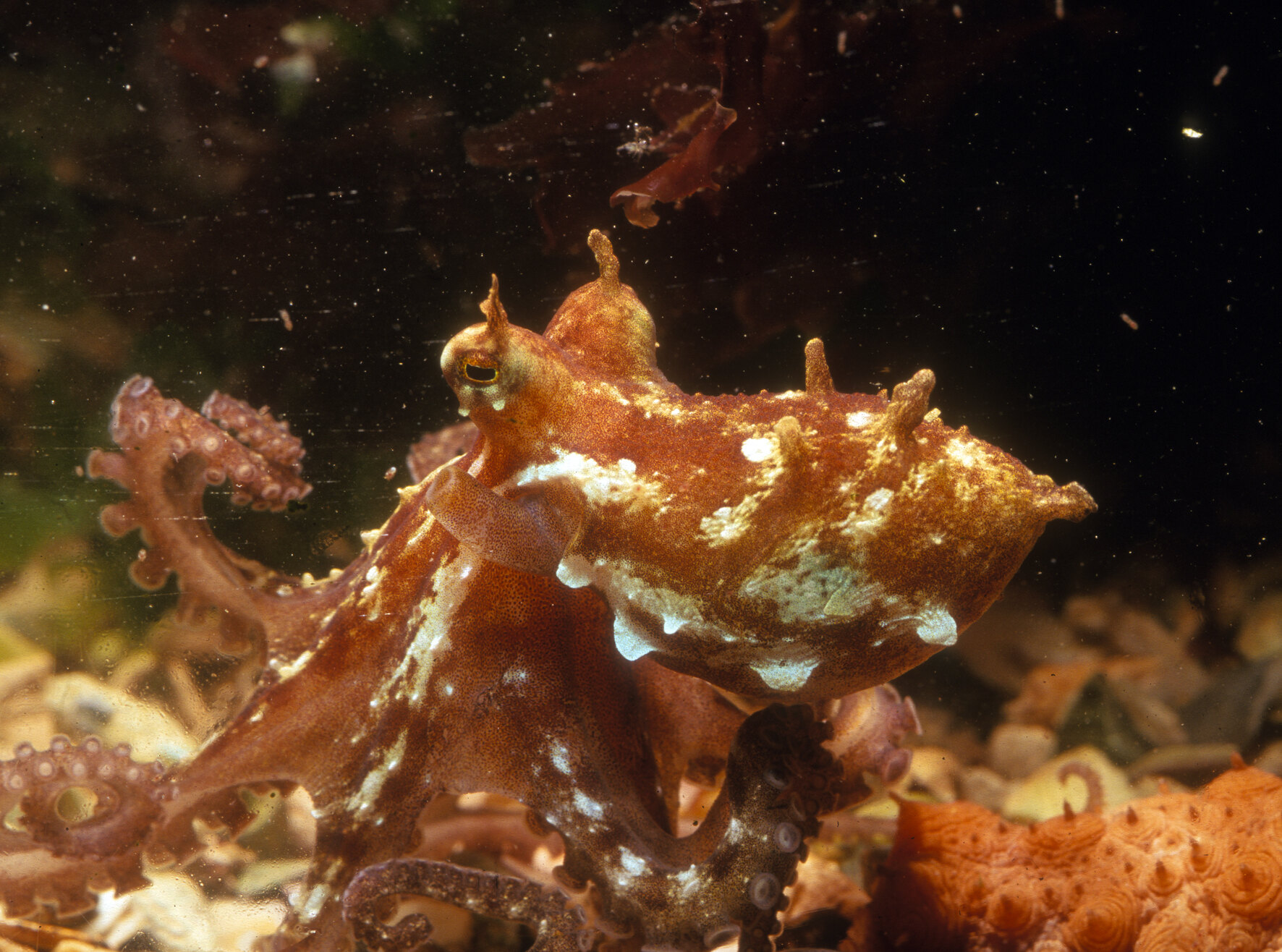

Conservation status
- Data Deficient (IUCN 3.1)

Scientific classification
- Kingdom: Animalia
- Phylum: Mollusca
- Class: Cephalopoda
- Order: Octopoda
- Family: Octopodidae
- Genus: Octopus
- Species: O. superciliosus

Binomial name
- Octopus superciliosus Quoy and Gaimard, 1832

= Octopus superciliosus =

Species of octopus

Octopus superciliosus (commonly the frilled pygmy octopus) is a species of octopus. It was first described in 1832 by Jean René Constant Quoy and Joseph Paul Gaimard based on a specimen found off Victoria during the 1826 to 1829 voyage of the Astrolabe.

== Description ==
O. superciliosus is described as a pygmy species. It is small, with a mantle length of up to 26 millimeters and a total length of up to 94 millimeters. It is white and cream to light brown, with an egg-shaped mantle and large eyes.

== Distribution ==
O. superciliosus is found in southeastern Australia, ranging from the central Great Australian Bight to Twofold Bay in New South Wales. It in an inshore species, with recorded depths from zero to 69 meters. O. superciliosus lives in sandy or mud bottoms, or among sponges or polyzoans.

== Life cycle ==
Female O. superciliosus lay large eggs, around 8-11 millimeters in length. Clutch sizes are unknown, but estimated at 50 to 100 eggs. Hatchlings are benthic and 4 to 5 millimeters in length.
