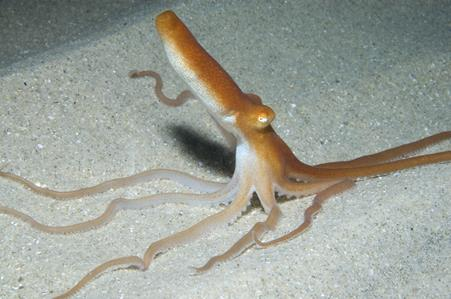

Conservation status
- Data Deficient (IUCN 3.1)

Scientific classification
- Kingdom: Animalia
- Phylum: Mollusca
- Class: Cephalopoda
- Order: Octopoda
- Family: Octopodidae
- Genus: Octopus
- Species: O. kaurna

Binomial name
- Octopus kaurna Stranks, 1990

= Octopus kaurna =

Southern sand octopus

Species of mollusc

Octopus kaurna, also known as the southern sand octopus, is an octopus native to the waters around the Great Australian Bight and Tasmania. It has an arm span of up to 50 cm (20 in) with long, unusually thin tentacles joined at the base by webbing and studded with small suckers. The species was first identified by Timothy Nathaniel Stranks. Kaurna is the name of an Australian Aboriginal clan which lived in the Adelaide region of South Australia.

== Behaviour ==
Unlike most octopuses, O. kaurna lacks color-changing chromatophors. However, it is able to hide from predators by burrowing itself in sand. The process begins with the octopus using its siphon to inject water into the sand, creating quicksand-like conditions which enable burrowing. Then, it uses its arms to burrow into the sand. Two arms will be extended to the surface, creating a ventilation shaft. At the same time, O. kaurna will use mucus to stabilize the shape of the burrow. Finally, the octopus will retract its two arms and push out loose sand with its siphon, creating a mucus-lined, ventilated burrow to rest in. While many octopuses bury themselves in a shallow layer of sediment for camouflage, O. kaurna is the only known species to exhibit sub-surface burrowing.
