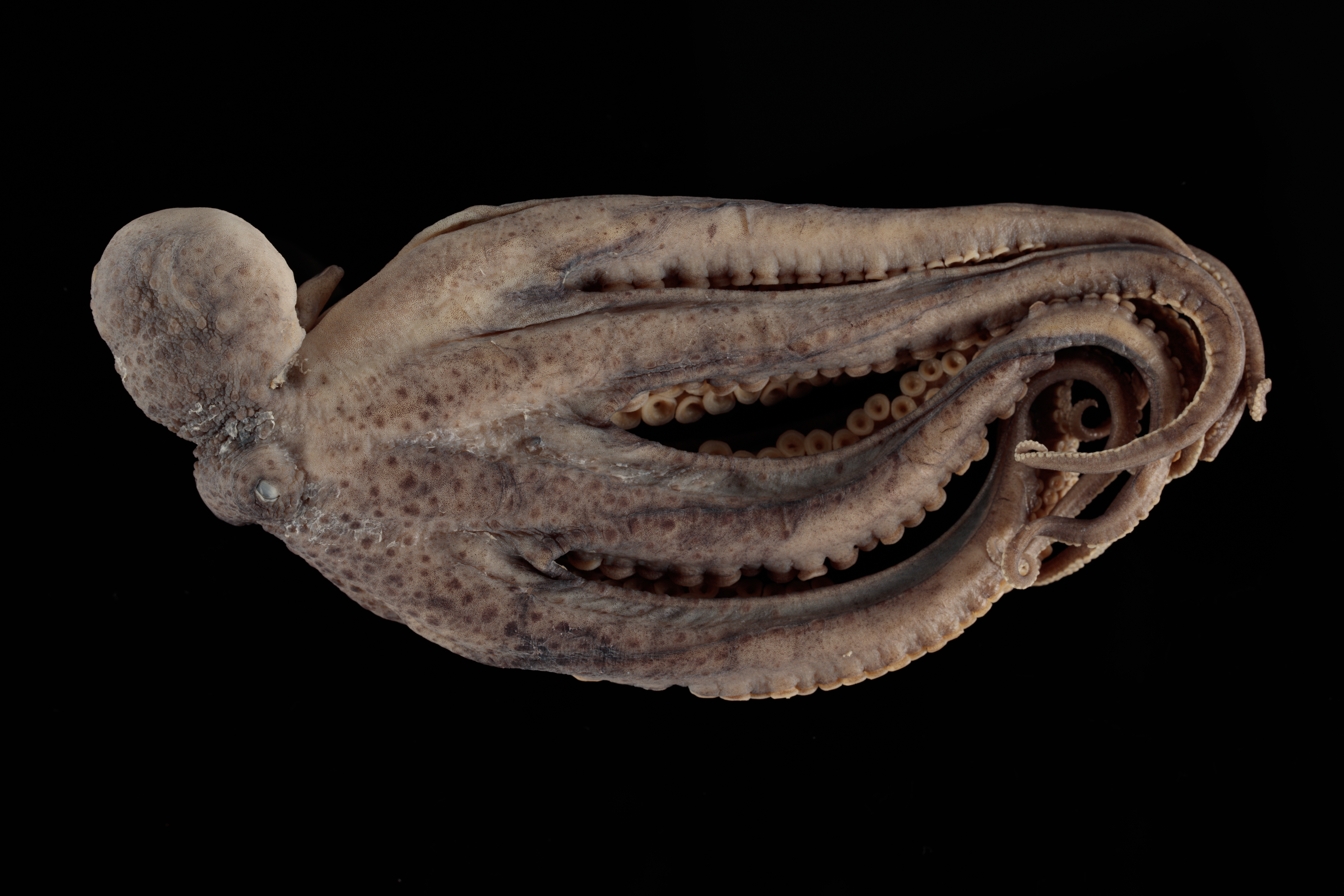

Conservation status
- Data Deficient (IUCN 3.1)

Scientific classification
- Kingdom: Animalia
- Phylum: Mollusca
- Class: Cephalopoda
- Order: Octopoda
- Family: Octopodidae
- Genus: Octopus
- Species: O. oliveri

Binomial name
- Octopus oliveri (Berry, 1914)

= Octopus oliveri =

Species of octopus

Octopus oliveri, is a species of octopus found in the western Pacific Ocean off the coast of Japan, Hawaii, and Kermadec Island, in reefs and boulder coasts.

It is a small species, roughly 70-260mm in length. Females will take longer to mate, the larger their body size. Afterwards, ~5000 eggs will hatch in about five weeks after being laid, and the male/female ratio seems unaffected by temperature. These eggs are laid in strings attached to a hard substrate.
