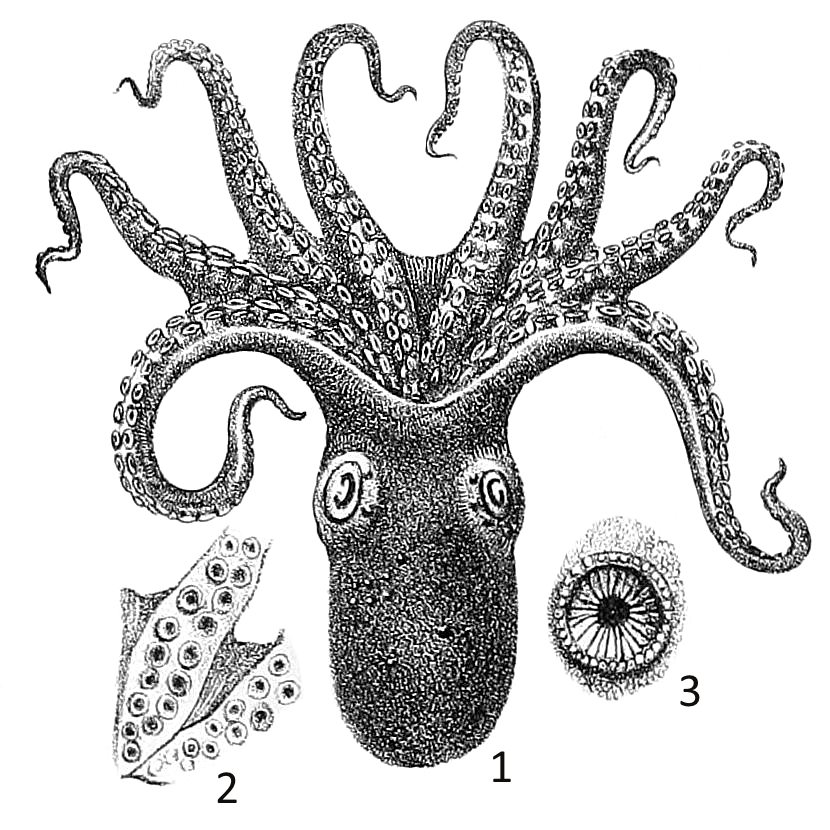

Conservation status
- Data Deficient (IUCN 3.1)

Scientific classification
- Kingdom: Animalia
- Phylum: Mollusca
- Class: Cephalopoda
- Order: Octopoda
- Family: Octopodidae
- Genus: Octopus
- Species: O. vitiensis

Binomial name
- Octopus vitiensis Hoyle, 1885

= Octopus vitiensis =

Species of octopus

Octopus vitiensis, or the bighead octopus, is a species of octopus provisionally placed in the genus Octopus. It was described by William Evans Hoyle in 1885 based on a specimen found in reefs in Kandavu, Fiji during a voyage of HMS Challenger.

== Description ==
O. vitiensis is maroon to dark purple-black in color. It has large eyes, a broad head, and arms of moderate length. The species is described as robust and muscular with scattered warts on the skin. O. vitiensis is small, and has a mantle length of up to 60 millimeters and a total length of up to 250 millimeters.

== Distribution ==
O. vitiensis is tropical, found in Fiji, Tonga, and Papua New Guinea; and benthic, found at depths of zero to 20 meters.

== Life cycle ==
O. vitiensis lays eggs two millimeters in length.
