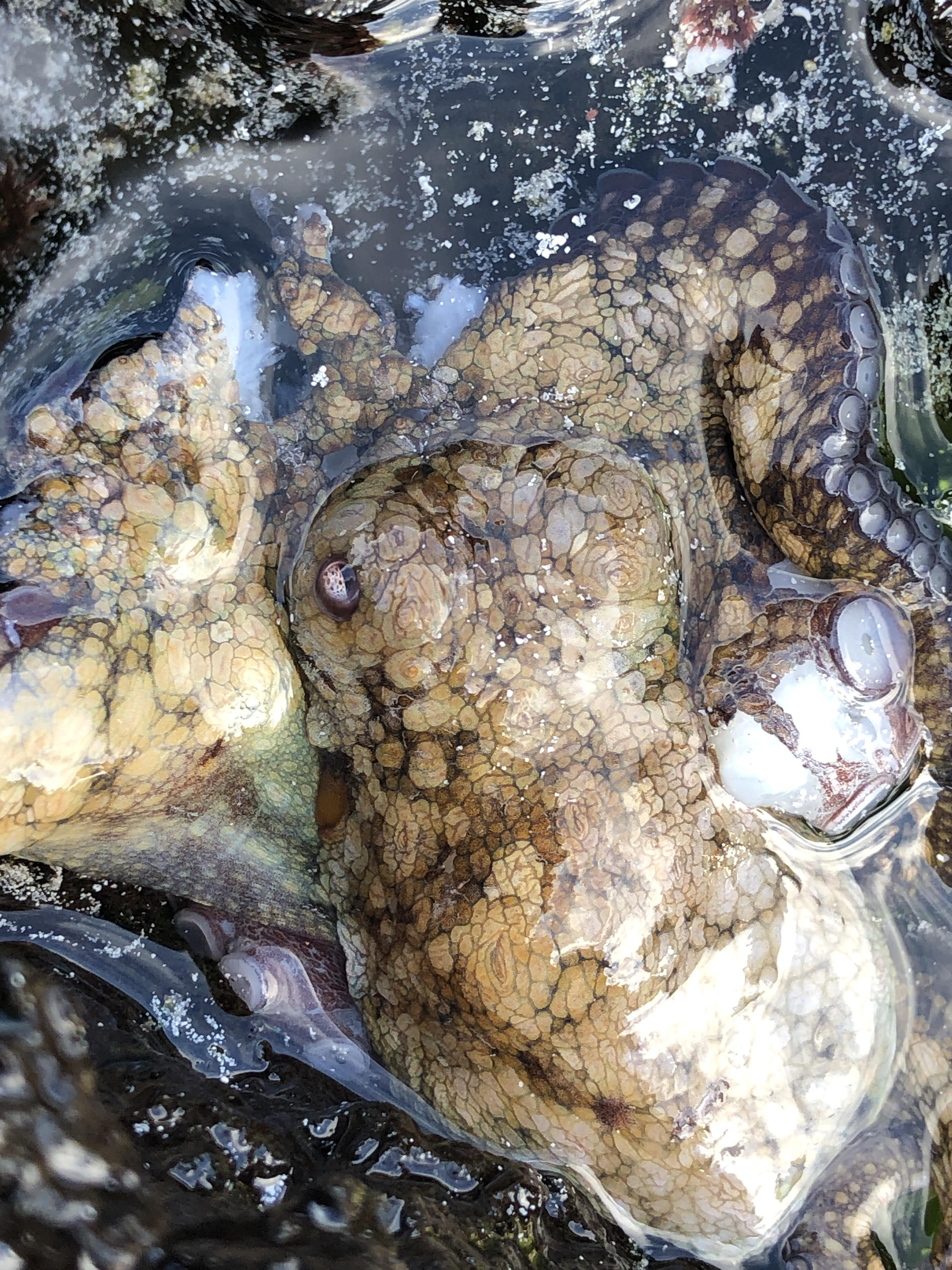

Conservation status
- Least Concern (IUCN 3.1)

Scientific classification
- Kingdom: Animalia
- Phylum: Mollusca
- Class: Cephalopoda
- Order: Octopoda
- Family: Octopodidae
- Genus: Octopus
- Species: O. oculifer

Binomial name
- Octopus oculifer (Hoyle, 1904)

= Octopus oculifer =

Species of mollusc

Octopus oculifer, also known as the Galápagos octopus, is a species of octopus endemic to the coast of the Galápagos, and has been identified in the Revillagigedos ecoregion, living between 0-50 m deep.
