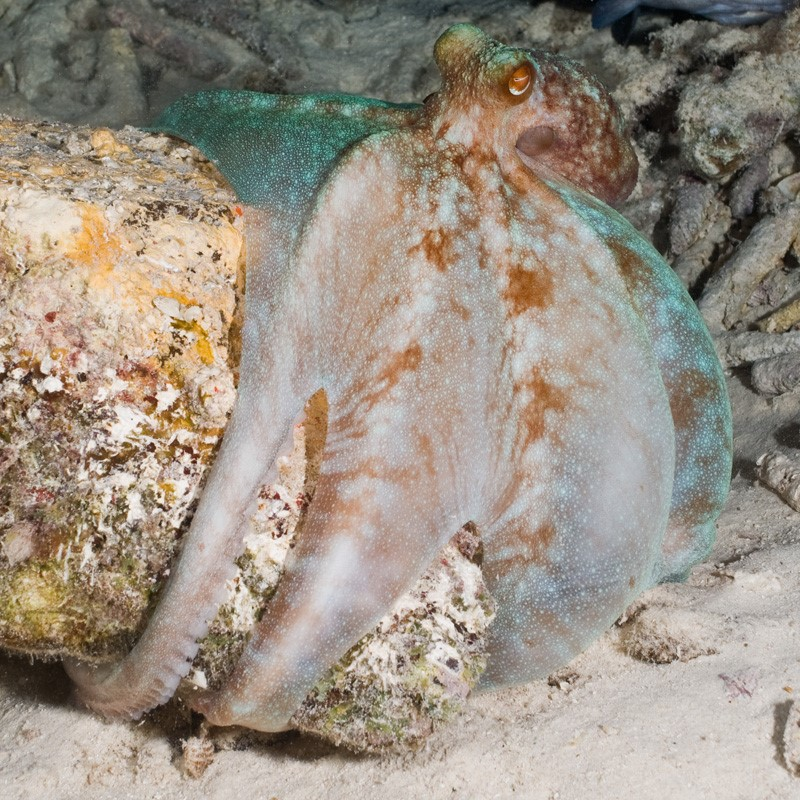

Conservation status
- Least Concern (IUCN 3.1)

Scientific classification
- Kingdom: Animalia
- Phylum: Mollusca
- Class: Cephalopoda
- Order: Octopoda
- Family: Octopodidae
- Genus: Octopus
- Species: O. briareus

Binomial name
- Octopus briareus Robson, 1929

= Caribbean reef octopus =

Species of cephalopod

The Caribbean reef octopus (Octopus briareus) is a coral reef marine animal. It has eight long arms that vary in length and diameter. In comparison to the arms, the mantle is large and bulky (up to 60 cm long). This species is difficult to describe because it changes color and texture to blend into its surroundings, using specialised skin cells known as chromatophores. Its color range is very large; it can change from crimson to green, and bumpy to smooth. It weighs around 3.3 lb or 1.5 kg.

== Ecology ==
=== Habitat and distribution ===
The Caribbean reef octopus lives in warm waters around coral reef environments and grassy and rocky sea beds. Their biogeographic regions are as follows: the Nearctic region, Neotropical region (Central and South America), oceanic islands and the Pacific Ocean.

The Caribbean reef octopus lives in hidden, rocky lairs that are difficult to locate. Their lairs are usually created in shallow warm waters. O. briareus is not a social animal, and stays at a safe distance from other octopuses of the same species, except for mating. If faced with a predator, a Caribbean reef octopus, like most other octopuses, sucks up a volume of water then expels it quickly in the form of a jet to propel itself away. To further deter predators, it can eject ink to mask its escape. This octopus does not live in its lair for its entire life; instead, it moves often except when caring for eggs or young.

=== Prey ===
The Caribbean reef octopus feeds on crabs, shrimp, lobsters, polychaetes and a variety of fish. It is a nocturnal species which only hunts at night. The Caribbean reef octopus is an intraguild predator of juvenile Caribbean spiny lobsters.

=== Predators ===
The Caribbean reef octopus does not seem to have any specialized or outstanding predators. It is preyed on mostly by sharks, stingrays and some other bony, predatory fish.

== Reproduction ==
The mating season lasts for one to two months and is usually around January. The male and female sexes do not display dimorphism. The male first "mounts" the female's mantle, then inserts the hectocotylus, an arm that acts as a "tube", to allow the sperm to enter the female's oviduct. This lasts around half an hour. O. briareus usually mates during the day and only the male octopus can initiate or stop the mating process. After the female octopus has been fertilized, she can store the sperm in her oviduct for at most 100 days. After finding a suitable lair, the female then lays eggs. Some females have been known to seal themselves in their lair while pregnant. A female can lay up to 500 eggs; clusters of eggs are joined by special stalks. The female then sits with her eggs until they are ready to hatch. If any creature comes near the eggs, the female will attack it, though if it kills the creature, will not eat it. The eggs take 50 to 80 days to hatch, but will hatch more quickly in warmer waters. Newly hatched young are able to jet propel themselves round and squirt ink, much like their parents. In just 14 weeks, the hatchlings are 75% of their full-grown size and in just 140 days, male hatchlings reach sexual maturity, and 150 days for females.

== Intelligence ==
Octopus briareus, like most other octopuses, is one of the most intelligent of all invertebrates (see cephalopod intelligence). The octopus's ability to remember where a foe resides and then avoid it is considered to be an intelligence trait. The Caribbean reef octopus has also been known to learn from others of the same species and some have disguised themselves as algae or coconuts to avoid predatory detection. This octopus, while not considered very aggressive, will show cannibalistic qualities if individuals are kept too close to one another in captivity. It has been seen hunting others of its species in the daytime in the wild off St Vincent.
