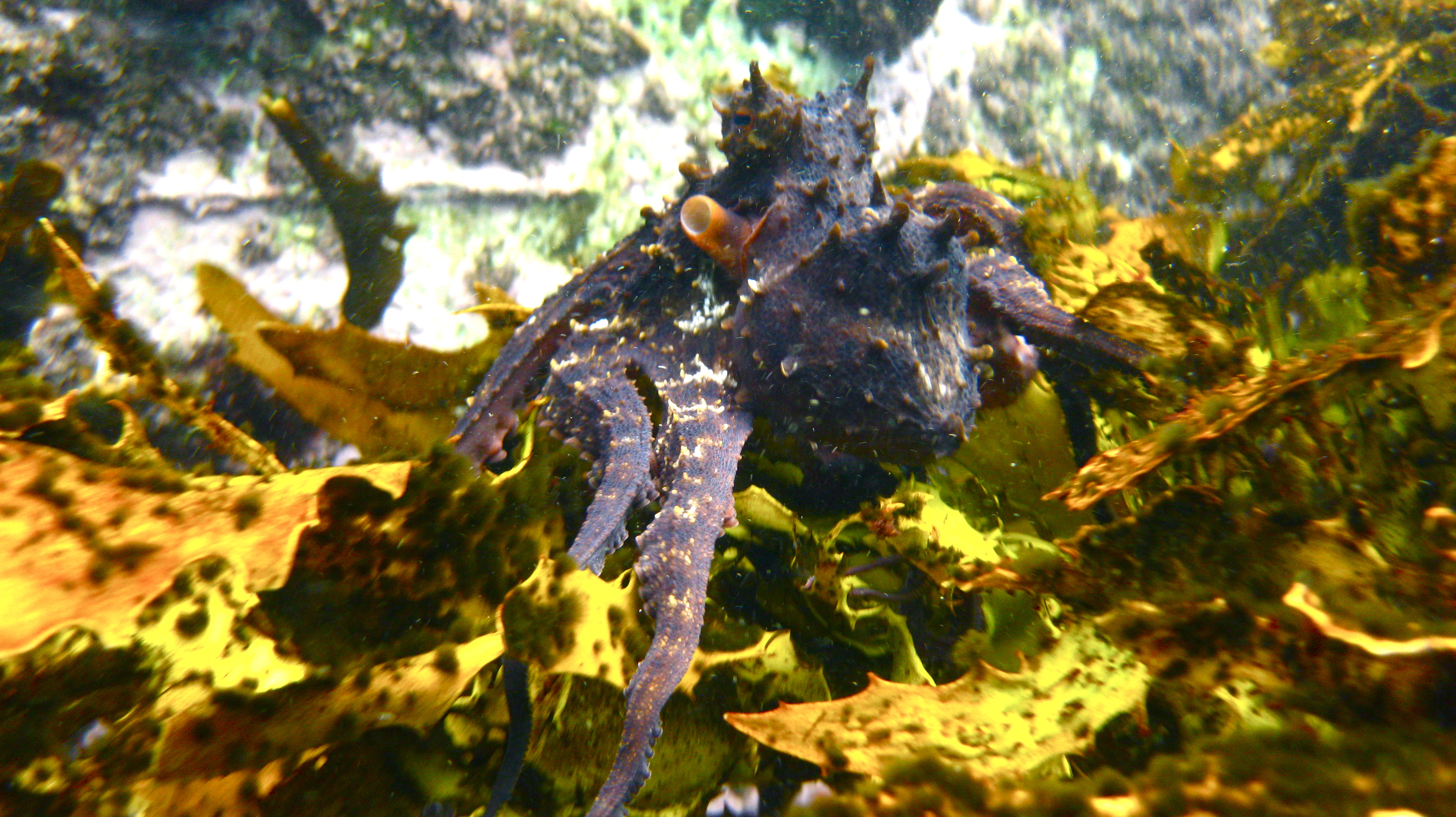

Conservation status
- Least Concern (IUCN 3.1)

Scientific classification
- Kingdom: Animalia
- Phylum: Mollusca
- Class: Cephalopoda
- Order: Octopoda
- Family: Octopodidae
- Genus: Macroctopus; Robson, 1928
- Species: M. maorum

Binomial name
- Macroctopus maorum (Hutton, 1880)

Synonyms
- Octopus communis Park, 1885; Octopus flindersi Cotton, 1932; Octopus maorum Hutton, 1880

= Macroctopus =

Species of mollusc

Macroctopus is a monospecific genus of cephalopod belonging to the family Octopodidae, the "typical octopuses". The only species in the genus is Macroctopus maorum, the Māori octopus or the New Zealand octopus (wheke in Māori). It is found in the waters around New Zealand and southern Australia. M. maorum is one of the largest octopus species living in the New Zealand and Australian waters. They feed mainly on crustaceans and fish. Although they have a short life span, the females lay thousands of eggs and are very protective of them. This taxon is regarded as a synonym of Pinnoctopus cordiformis by some authorities.

== Taxonomy ==
Macroctopus was first proposed as a new subgenus of Octopus in 1928 by Guy Coburn Robson with Octopus maorum as its type species. This species was first formally described in 1880 by Frederick Hutton with its type locality given as Dunedin. This taxon is regarded, by some authorities, as being regarded as conspecific with Pinnoctopus cordiformis, with M. maorum being treated as the junior synonym of P. cordiformis. Yet other authorities do not regard P. cordiformis as conspecific with M. maorum and suggest that P. cordiformis is a synonym of Enteroctopus zealandicus.

== Identification ==
Macroctopus maorum is a large octopus and it is regularly described as a ‘robust’ species, it is a member of the Octopus macropus species complex. The morphological traits characteristic of this complex are a high number of gill lamellae, a robust conical copulatory organ and arms of varying length with long unequal dorsal arms generally four to six times longer than the mantle. Although being unequal, their arms are said to be long and evenly tapering and Macroctopus maorum are even known to regrow arms when one has been lost. Being the largest member of its complex arm span is said to exceed 3 metres (9.8 ft). They have four to six suckers on the first and second arm pairs which are usually about 40 millimetres (1.6 in) in size. Suckers are arranged in two rows down the arm length. There is thought to be no correlation between sexes and size of suckers; however, there was an increase in sucker size with body mass increase. Coloration of this species can vary Macroctopus maorum can be distinguished from other species by the colour, they will be either orange-brown or dark purple-grey. The octopus has numerous small iridescent white spots on the web, arms and dorsal arm crown but there are no spots present on the mantle. Macroctopus maorum has 12–14 gill lamella per demibranch, the mantle is described as broadly ovoid and exhibits a skin pattern of longitudinal ridges. Along the dorsum there are five rows of unbranched papillae and two more papillae appear individually above the eyes. Octopus papillae are camouflage specialised with the ability to change shape, such as by extending in and out from the body. Male M. maorum have a small ligula, the ligula is a specialised arm tip on the hectocotylized arm which grips to allow the transfer of spermatophores. Within the complex O. macropus, Macroctopus maorum is thought to be the largest member. In a study estimating M. maorum size based on a sample of 90 beaks, the largest individual found had a body length of 2.0 metres (6 ft 7 in) and body mass of 12 kilograms (26 lb). Macroctopus maorum has an upper beak and lower beak, the upper beak can be used to differentiate Macroctopus maorum and Enteroctpus zealandicus as it has a lack of overlap in the ratio of upper hood length and upper chest length. Macroctopus maorum hatchlings are usually about 5.06 millimetres (0.199 in) in size, they have 7–8 suckers per arm and each dorsal arm will have 6–11 chromatophores.

== Life cycle/Phenology ==
=== Sexual maturity ===
==== Female ====
Grubert and Wadley assigned 5 maturity stages for the egg development of Macroctopus maorum:

1. Newly formed primary oogonia which has a small, distinct nucleus is visible and Follucular cells attach to the ovum and forming follicular epithelium.
2. Follicular epithelium has completely filled the ova and nucleus is no longer visible. There are no yolk present and cuboidal follicular cells become distinct and closely packed.
3. First granular yolk appears in the ova. Epithelial convolution still occupying much of the interval volume.
4. Only periphery of the ova found and been forced out by the expanding yolk. Nuclei of epithelium has now become indistinct.
5. Mature ova which have thin walls and are replete with yolk. Follicular epithelium produced the chorion and degenerated. Ova is free in the ovary, oviduct or oviducal glands.

Female that undergoes stage 4 oocytes were caught throughout the month of April to October, while those females that undergo stage 3 were caught only in April and July. However, females with stage 5 oocytes were caught every month except May and August.

==== Male ====
In the male, the position of testis from juvenile to adult is different. The position of testis moved backward until it reached the final position at the hinder end of the body during the adult stage. Fully mature male octopus consist of fully-formed spermatophores in the Needham’s sac. They usually had up to 13 spermatophores in the Needham’s sac. Furthermore, their reproductive organ will increase in size over the lifetime.

=== Mating ===
During mating, the male Macroctopus maorum will be on top pinning down the female and usually overpowering the female physically or pouncing on them. The male will inserts a sperm packet by passing it along the arms to the oviduct of the female. When it gets near the oviduct, the end of the spermatophore burst open and release the sperm. Male octopus will then become senescent and die after mating. Female Macroctopus maorum mature and mate during March and October.

=== Eggs laying, brooding and hatching ===
Macroctopus maorum construct the posterior mantle to push out the eggs during egg laying. The female usually will stop eating for 2 weeks during the laying eggs period and continue to look after the eggs until they hatched. Macroctopus maorum usually lay approximate 7000 eggs. Their eggs are usually clusters of 3-12 eggs and cemented directly to the substratum. Octopus maorum swept across the eggs sheet with one or more tentacles to keep the eggs well oxygenated, clean and safe from predators. During brooding period female Macroctopus maorum will stop feeding so that it produce less wastes and ensure the water quality is good for the eggs. When the eggs are about to hatch Macroctopus maorum will frequently squirt water on the eggs using siphon until the eggs hatched. After the eggs hatch, the female Macroctopus maorum will swim away and might die as she has been weakened from guarding the eggs. The hatchlings are planktonic and have 7 to 8 suckers per arm. If the hatchling manages to survive, the life cycle will be repeated.

== Global distribution and habitat ==
=== Global distribution ===
M. maorum is commonly found in the waters of New Zealand and South Australia, preferring temperate to sub-antarctic waters. In New Zealand they are found off the coasts of both the North and South islands, and is one of the most common species of octopus in the country. M. maorum is also common in the waters of the islands surrounding New Zealand including Campbell, Chatham and Auckland Islands. In Southeast Tasmania, at Eaglehawk Bay the site of a commercial fishery is the only known inshore location where the M. maorum have been known to gather in large numbers year round.

=== Habitat ===
M. maorum lives in the benthic zone in soft-sediment and rubble habitats with depths of 0–549 metres (0–1,801 ft) and will sometimes forage in nearby hard-reef habitats and are less common at the fringes between reefal and soft sediment habitats. Rather than settling in a specific location, M. maorum uses temporary shelters. In Tasmania, young M. maorum have been observed settling in intertidal rock pools. Similar sightings of M. maorum in intertidal rock pools have been reported during the summer months in Kaikoura and Banks Peninsula.

== Diet/Predators ==
=== Diet and Foraging ===
A study of M. maorum off the coast of southeastern Tasmania found evidence of 12 different species in the stomachs of sampled octopuses with the dominant prey being the crab P. gaimardii and other M. maorum. This is a low number of prey species compared to other species of octopus and it is assumed that the diet of M. maorum in Southeastern Tasmania is more diverse than results indicated in the study. M. Maorum will eat bivalves, crustaceans and fish but are selective and show preference to lobster, crabs and scallops. As is the case with other octopus species, M. maorum injects prey with a toxin that slowly liquefies flesh so that it can be more easily digested. Cannibalism is a common behavior for many species of octopus in the order of large eating small, however small M. maorum are known to attack larger octopus particularly Octopus tetricus where habitats overlap. M. maorum feeds mainly at night unless food is scarce in which case it must forage during the day. M. maorum is an extremely evolved hunter with a range of hunting methods including stalking, ambush, jet-propulsion and digging. When executing different hunting methods colour and texture are adjusted, often by darkening and erection of papillae. Prey such as crabs are pounced on using the speed of jet propulsion and prey is trapped under the octopus’s web in what is appropriately called the parachute position. Alternatively, in a situation where prey is nearby the octopus will simply snatch it with one of its tentacles. In the case of prey escaping and hiding M. maorum will persistently dig to uncover prey by pushing material into its web and dumping the removed material by the entrance to its home.

=== Predators and parasites ===
Macroctopus maorum is preyed upon by fur seals, sea lions, pilot whales, other octopus and the northern royal albatross. Penguins such as yellow-eyed, fiordland crested and little blue penguin might prey on Macroctopus maorum as well. M. maorum hosts dicyemid mesozoans and digenetic trematodes as parasites. A more recent study of the species adds wobbegongs, school and gummy sharks, mulloway, queen snapper and dolphins to the list of predators. Sea slugs will often feed on M. maorum eggs.

== Other information ==
While research was being carried out the behavior of M. maorum was monitored and results showed that while being in the aquarium they showed a variety of behaviors such as fighting, flamboyant postures and defensive up-turning of arms, withdrawing and cleaning. Small M. maorum would often take on larger octopuses such as O. tetricus such as a 300 grams (11 oz) M. maorum fought and started to eat a 1 kg O. tetricus. M. maorum will generally reach a weight of up to 12 kilograms (26 lb) when fully grown. They live solitarily in a den for up to three months at a time. They would gather prey remains to form a midden (piles of shells, bones and rocks) the midden is used to conceal the entrance to their den. Sometimes mature M. maorum have been located in Eaglehawk Bay in Tasmania nobody knows why they aggregate here or where they come from. M. maorum has a significant economic effect on rock lobster fisheries in New Zealand and Southern Australia. M. maorum will prey on trapped southern rock lobster killing many and leaving some lobster missing limbs making them unsaleable. This also means that M. maorum is being caught as bycatch. The South Australian rock lobster fisheries report that since 1983 octopus bycatch has ranged from 38,000 to 119,000 octopus a year. M. maorum are fished commercially in Eaglehawk Bay Tasmania where they congregate throughout the year in large numbers (as many as 70 octopuses). Eaglehawk Bay is the sole location where such a large inshore congregation is known to occur. M. maorum had been used as a model to determine the age of merobenthic, by using stylet increment analysis. SIA (Stylet Increment Analysis) is a method which was developed recently to determine the age of an octopus, age is important for estimating the growth rate, population age structure, mortality rate, productivity and processes. Due to this understanding, it can be used to make important decisions surrounding fisheries and conservation management. Stylets are highly reduced internal shells that consist of small rod-like structures, the result of SIA showed that a stylet of M. maorum can be hard to prepare and age. However, SIA can only provide the relative age of the species, due to lack of knowledge surrounding the formation of the first stylet increment. Therefore, alternative methods of age determination of the octopus may need to be explored.
