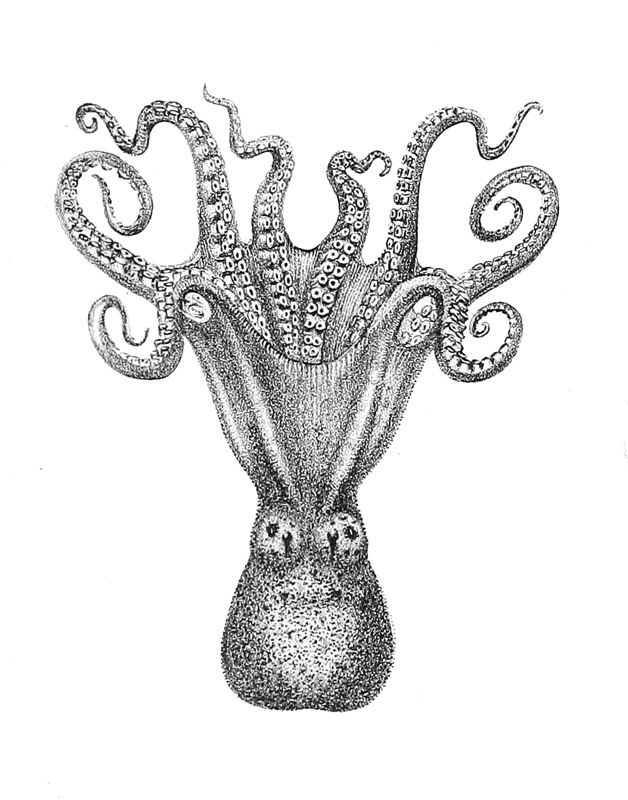

Conservation status
- Least Concern (IUCN 3.1)

Scientific classification
- Kingdom: Animalia
- Phylum: Mollusca
- Class: Cephalopoda
- Order: Octopoda
- Family: Octopodidae
- Genus: Octopus
- Species: O. australis

Binomial name
- Octopus australis Hoyle, 1885

Synonyms
- Robsonella australis (Hoyle, 1885)

= Octopus australis =

Species of octopus

Octopus australis (commonly the hammer octopus or sometimes the southern octopus) is a species of octopus. It gets the common name hammer octopus from a modified arm possessed by males and used in reproduction. It was first described by William Evans Hoyle in 1885, based on a specimen found in Port Jackson in New South Wales.

== Description ==
O. australis is medium-sized, with a mature mantle length of around 20 to 25 millimeters for males and 50 to 60 millimeters for females, an arm span of around 40 centimeters, and a maximum total length of 49.9 centimeters. Males weigh around 210 grams and females around 105 grams. The head of O. australis is narrow and egg-shaped and it has small eyes. It is typically a sandy cream color.

== Distribution ==
O. australis is found in coastal waters and bays along the eastern coast of Australia from central Queensland to southern New South Wales, most commonly in subtropical inshore waters, and from depths of around 3 to 140 meters. It tends to live on sand or mud seafloors, among sponges, ascidians, or mollusks, or in seagrass.

== Diet ==
The diet of O. australis is mostly composed of isopods, but they also eat other types of crustaceans, other octopuses, bristle worms, gastropods, and bivalves. They usually forage at night and hide in trash, shells, or the seafloor during the day.

== Life cycle ==
Females lay around 50 to 130 eggs per brood, each egg being about 11 millimeters long. They normally lay eggs in the summer. Eggs take over 100 days to hatch. O. australis have an estimated lifespan of 18 to 20 months.
