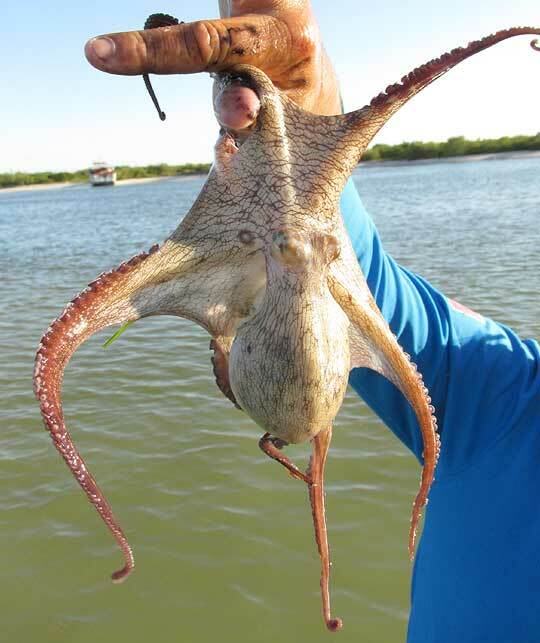

Conservation status
- Least Concern (IUCN 3.1)

Scientific classification
- Kingdom: Animalia
- Phylum: Mollusca
- Class: Cephalopoda
- Order: Octopoda
- Family: Octopodidae
- Genus: Octopus
- Species: O. maya

Binomial name
- Octopus maya Voss & Solís, 1966

= Octopus maya =

Species of mollusc

Octopus maya, known colloquially as the Mexican four-eyed octopus and the Mayan octopus is a shallow water octopus that can be found in the tropical Western Atlantic Ocean. It is common to sea grass prairies and coral formations. The species was initially discovered in an octopus fishery in Campeche Mexico, where its close external resemblance to Octopus vulgaris led to its mistaken grouping with the other species. O. maya makes up 80% of octopus catch in the Yucatán Peninsula, while O. vulgaris makes up the remaining 20%.

Octopus maya can be identified by its large, double-ringed ocellus (a false eye spot) and large egg size (averaging 17 mm or 0.67 in). The mantle is muscular, large, and oval in shape. There is some variation in the definite shape of the posterior end of the mantle, but all are fairly narrow and meet the head at a characteristically narrow neck. Females grow to be larger than males, weighing in at 1,024 g (36 oz) with mantles measuring 124 millimetres (4.9 in). Males grow to be about 484 g (17.1 oz) with mantles 91 g (3.2 oz) long. They are usually dark brown in color but may turn red when agitated. They are also able to mimic the color of the sand on the seafloor. The ocellus is a dark red brown and found directly beneath the eye between the second and third arm. It has been found in depths between 3 and 25 m (10 and 82 ft) along the continental shelf of the Yucatán Peninsula.

== Habitat ==
Campeche Bank is located off of the Yucatán Peninsula in the Gulf of Mexico. It extends about 125 miles (201 km) into the Gulf where it suddenly drops off, ending at the Alacran Reef. There are very low levels of sediments along the Bank between the shore and the reef. The benthic environment in this region can be characterized by fine carbonate sand. The strong currents the flow westward along the bank year round likely contribute to the nature of the benthic sand and lack of sediments.

== Diet ==
Octopus maya is known to feed primarily on benthic prey such as crustaceans, bivalves, fish, gastropods, other octopuses, and even birds. Two specific prey items that O. maya commonly feeds on are blue crab (Callinectes sapidus) and the crown conch snail (Melongena corona bispinosa). Neurotoxins in O. maya's saliva cause temporary paralysis in its prey, allowing for easier consumption. This paralytic also works on conspecifics, leading researchers to believe that it is used in territorial defense as well as intraspecific competition. Beyond the chemicals found in their saliva, not much is known about hunting techniques specific to O. maya. However, looking at sister taxa, including the closely related Common Octopus (Octopus vulgaris), can shed some light on likely mechanisms used by O. maya. O vulgaris has been observed using its strong suckers to restrain its prey, while carrying the victim toward its mouth. The octopus can then inject the organism with saliva, drilling holes into the bodies of shelled organisms such as crabs and bivalves using its beak as necessary, and consume its prey.

== Lifespan and reproduction ==
Octopus maya is semelparous, meaning that females die following a single round of reproduction. Males are able to reproduce multiple times during their reproductive phase, but only survive for a single spawning season. This period of activity during which males actively search for a mate makes them much more vulnerable to predators. The male will fertilize the female's eggs internally, then the female will carry them within her body for between 14 and 50 days until spawning. The spawning process lasts approximately 5 days, during which the female will deposit her eggs in a den for incubation. The female blows jets of water over the strands of eggs to keep them clean and ventilated, as well as providing protection to them until hatching. During this period, the female will not leave the eggs to eat, resulting in her death shortly after her offspring hatch. The incubation period for O. maya typically lasts between 30 and 35 days, although there may be individual variation.

== Conservation and climate change ==
Octopus maya is sensitive to temperatures exceeding 27 degrees Celsius (81 °F). As increased temperatures it suffers a decrease in fitness and reproductive capabilities. Thus, rising ocean temperatures pose a serious threat to this species. Continued fishing of this octopus along with dwindling populations could quickly become serious as the processes of climate change causes continued rise in ocean temperatures
