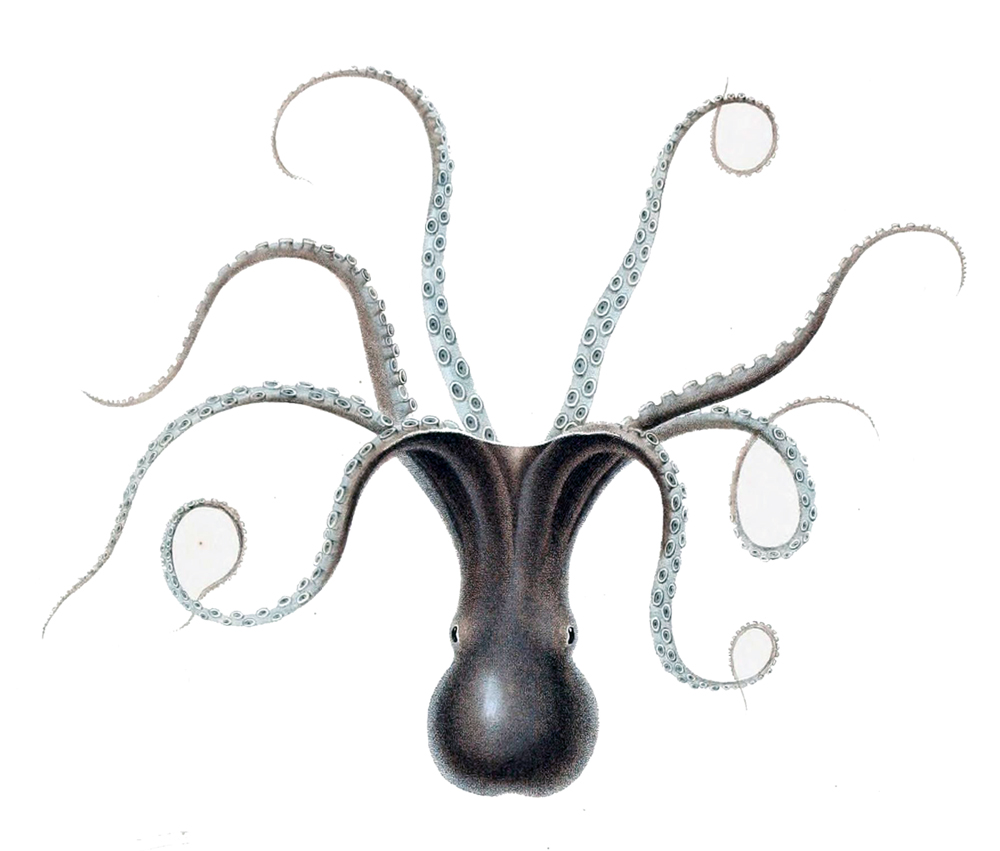

Conservation status
- Data Deficient (IUCN 3.1)

Scientific classification
- Kingdom: Animalia
- Phylum: Mollusca
- Class: Cephalopoda
- Order: Octopoda
- Family: Octopodidae
- Genus: Octopus
- Species: O. tehuelchus

Binomial name
- Octopus tehuelchus d'Orbigny, 1834

Synonyms
- Octopus lobensis Castellanos & Menni, 1969

= Octopus tehuelchus =

Species of mollusc

Octopus tehuelchus, commonly known as the Patagonian octopus, is a species of octopus, a marine cephalopod mollusc of the order Octopoda. It is native to shallow waters in the subtropical southwestern Atlantic Ocean. It was first described in 1834 by the French naturalist Alcide d'Orbigny.

== Description ==
This is a small to medium-sized octopus with a maximum length of about 20 cm (8 in). The mantle is globular with a smooth surface. The head is slightly narrower than the mantle, the eyes are prominent and are surrounded by small granulations. The mantle opening is wide with a long funnel. The neck is constricted and the eight arms are two-thirds to three-quarters of the length of the rest of the animal. The second pair of arms is the shortest and the fourth pair is the longest. The hectocotylus of the male is on the right third arm, and the male also has enlarged suckers.

== Distribution and habitat ==
Octopus tehuelchus is native to the subtropical southwestern Atlantic Ocean. Its range extends along the coasts of Brazil and Argentina between 30°S and 44°S, and between 50°W and 65°W. It occurs in the intertidal zone and the shallow subtidal zone, down to depths of around 90 m (300 ft). It occurs over reefs and sandy seabeds, often hiding in crevices or under boulders and in empty mollusc shells.

== Ecology ==
This octopus feeds on crabs and small clams and is known to drill into gastropod shells to extract hermit crabs. The octopus is itself heavily preyed on by young sharks off the coast of Argentina.

Breeding in this species takes place between autumn and spring. As with many other octopus species, the female selects a shelter and broods a batch of eggs. An invertebrate shell is usually chosen as a shelter; small individuals usually choose gastropod shells such as Zidona dufresnei, Odontocymbiola magellanica or Buccinanops cochlidium, clams such as Pitar rostratus or Amiantis purpurata or large barnacles in the genus Balanus. Medium-sized individuals favour shells of the oyster Ostrea puelchana, while the largest individuals create their own shelters from shell fragments and other materials. The oyster is the most favoured shelter overall, with the majority of eggs being deposited inside the concave valve.
