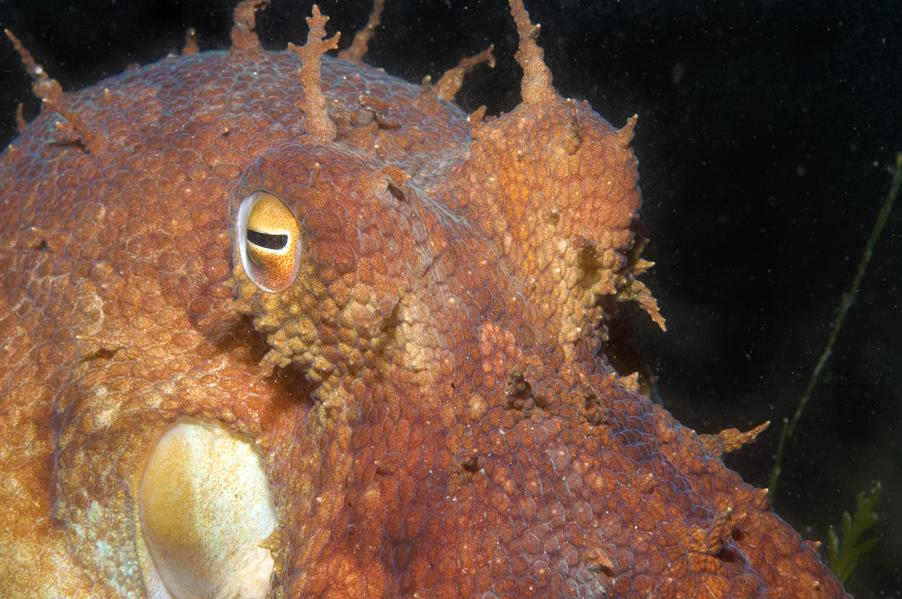

Conservation status
- Least Concern (IUCN 3.1)

Scientific classification
- Kingdom: Animalia
- Phylum: Mollusca
- Class: Cephalopoda
- Order: Octopoda
- Family: Octopodidae
- Genus: Octopus
- Species: O. pallidus

Binomial name
- Octopus pallidus Hoyle, 1885

= Octopus pallidus =

Species of mollusc

Octopus pallidus, the pale octopus, is a medium-sized species of octopus endemic to the temperate coastal waters of southern Australia. It is the target of a commercial trap fishery in Bass Strait and has been the subject of substantial research into cephalopod reproductive biology, vision and age determination.

The species was described in 1885 by the British zoologist W. E. Hoyle from material collected during the Challenger expedition.

== Description ==
The pale octopus is a medium-sized octopus with a total arm span reaching about 60 cm and a mantle length typically between 70 and 110 mm in adults. As its common name suggests, the body is uniformly pale, ranging from off-white through cream to light pink-orange, and lacks the strongly contrasting patterning found in some other Australian octopus species.

== Distribution and habitat ==
The pale octopus is found in shallow shelf waters off southern Australia, including Tasmania, Victoria, South Australia and, less commonly, southern New South Wales. It inhabits soft-bottom habitats such as sand and shell-grit substrates, often near beds of sponges or sea squirts, and is taken commercially from depths of 15 to 85 m in Bass Strait.

== Behaviour and ecology ==
The pale octopus is largely nocturnal and ambushes prey from rubble or burrow refuges. Hatchlings begin foraging immediately and feed primarily on bivalves. Females lay relatively large eggs that are attached to a hard substrate, and the hatchlings are benthic from the outset rather than passing through a planktonic paralarva stage.

Experimental studies of vision in the species have shown that both sexes can discriminate vertical from horizontal rectangles and can distinguish gradient greys from uniform grey backgrounds.

== Reproduction and lifespan ==
Female maturation in the pale octopus depends on both age and season, with reproduction concentrated in cooler months. The species is short-lived, with a typical adult lifespan of one to two years and a single terminal reproductive event (semelparity), as is the rule across the genus Octopus.

The pale octopus has become a focal species for the development of age-determination techniques in octopuses, which are difficult to age because their soft tissues do not deposit countable growth bands. Researchers at the University of Tasmania have validated counts of growth increments in the stylet (the small internal vestigial shell remnant) as a reliable ageing method in this species, and have separately validated quantification of the age-pigment lipofuscin in brain tissue as a complementary tool.

== Fishery ==
The pale octopus supports the principal commercial octopus fishery in southeastern Australia, the Tasmanian Octopus Fishery (TOF), which operates in Bass Strait and waters east of Flinders Island under licence from the Tasmanian Department of Natural Resources and Environment. Targeted fishing for pale octopus in Tasmanian waters dates to about 1980, and since December 2009 a specific octopus licence has been required to participate.

The fishery uses unbaited moulded plastic "shelter pots" (volume approximately 3,000 mL) attached to demersal longlines up to 3–4 km in length, set on the sea floor at depths of 15 to 85 m. Octopus enter the unbaited pots seeking shelter, and pots are typically hauled after a soak time of 3–6 weeks. Annual catches have ranged from 55 to 132 tonnes since the early 2000s, fluctuating around 80 tonnes for much of the 2010s.

Smaller catches of pale octopus are taken in Victorian state waters under the Octopus Eastern Zone Fishery.

== Gallery ==
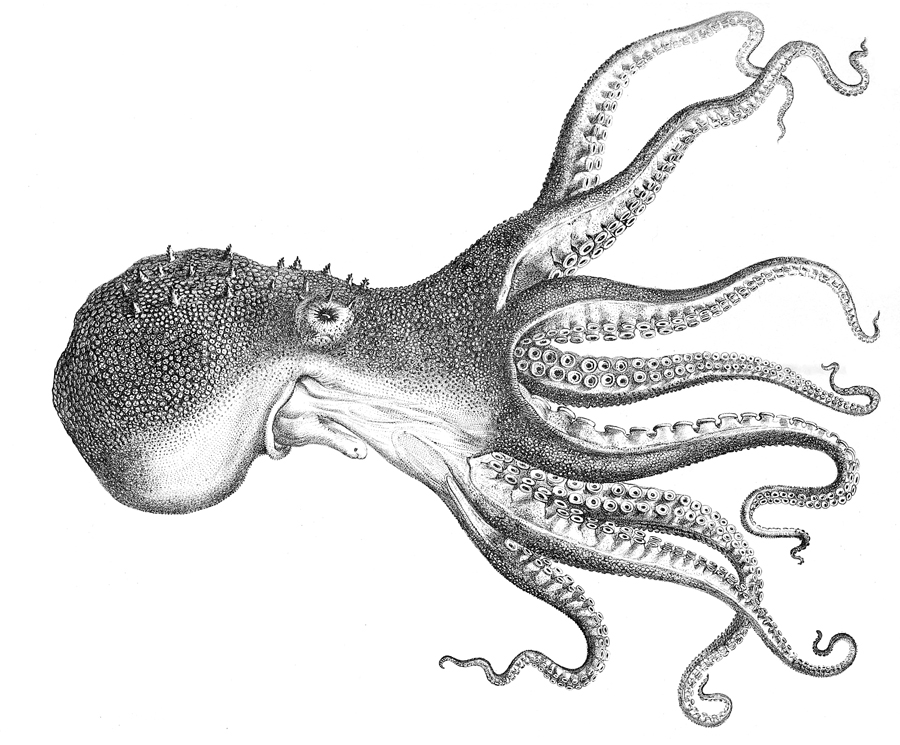
Diagram of Octopus pallidus
