= Octopus hawaiiensis =

Hawaiian octopus

Conservation status
- Data Deficient (IUCN 3.1)

Scientific classification
- Kingdom: Animalia
- Phylum: Mollusca
- Class: Cephalopoda
- Order: Octopoda
- Family: Octopodidae
- Genus: Octopus
- Species: O. hawaiiensis

Binomial name
- Octopus hawaiiensis Souleyet, 1852

Species of octopus

Octopus hawaiiensis is a small species of octopus endemic to the Hawaiian Islands, belonging to the family Octopodidae. It inhabits shallow reef flats, tide pools, and nearshore rocky environments, where it occupies crevices and sandy substrates. Locally referred to as he‘e, the species plays an important role in Hawaiian coastal ecosystems as both predator and prey.

Octopus hawaiiensis is often confused with juvenile Octopus cyanea, but it can be distinguished by its smaller adult size and mottled reddish-brown coloration. Its endemic distribution makes it a useful indicator species for monitoring coastal ecosystem health in Hawaiʻi.

== Taxonomy and nomenclature ==
Octopus hawaiiensis was first described in 1914 by American malacologist Samuel Stillman Berry. It is classified within the family Octopodidae. The species has occasionally been confused taxonomically with unclassified or cryptic nearshore octopus species in Hawaiʻi, highlighting the need for continued phylogenetic research.

== Description ==
Octopus hawaiiensis is characterized by a mottled reddish-brown coloration, which allows it to blend into rocky reef environments. It exhibits rapid chromatophore expansion and contraction, enabling dynamic camouflage similar to other members of Octopodidae. Adult individuals typically reach a mantle length of 15–20 cm, with proportionally long arms and a flexible skin texture that can shift between smooth and bumpy to match surrounding surfaces. The species is notably smaller than O. cyanea, with a more compact body shape and finer mottling patterns.

== Distribution and habitat ==
This species is endemic to the Hawaiian Islands and is most commonly observed in nearshore environments less than 30m deep. It inhabits reef flats, tide pools, sandy patches, and rocky crevices, where it can avoid predators and ambush prey. Its restricted range makes it an important indicator of nearshore ecosystem health.

== Ecology and behavior ==
Octopus hawaiiensis is a benthic predator, feeding primarily on small crustaceans, mollusks, and fish. Like other octopuses, it uses its arms and suckers to manipulate prey and its beak to break shells. It relies heavily on camouflage for both predation and defense, shifting skin color and texture to match its surroundings. Predators include larger reef fish, eels, and humans. Reproductive behavior is poorly documented, but it is presumed to involve egg deposition in protected crevices, followed by maternal brooding.

== Human use and cultural significance ==
In Hawaiian culture, octopuses are known as he‘e. Octopus hawaiiensis is part of traditional subsistence fishing and is also taken recreationally. Octopuses hold cultural significance in Hawaiian mythology and are sometimes associated with shape-shifting legends and reef guardian spirits.

== Conservation status ==
As of 2025, Octopus hawaiiensis has not been evaluated by the IUCN Red List. While no formal conservation measures are in place for this species specifically, it may benefit from broader nearshore fisheries regulations and habitat protection initiatives in Hawaiʻi. Potential threats include overharvesting, habitat degradation, and coastal development.
