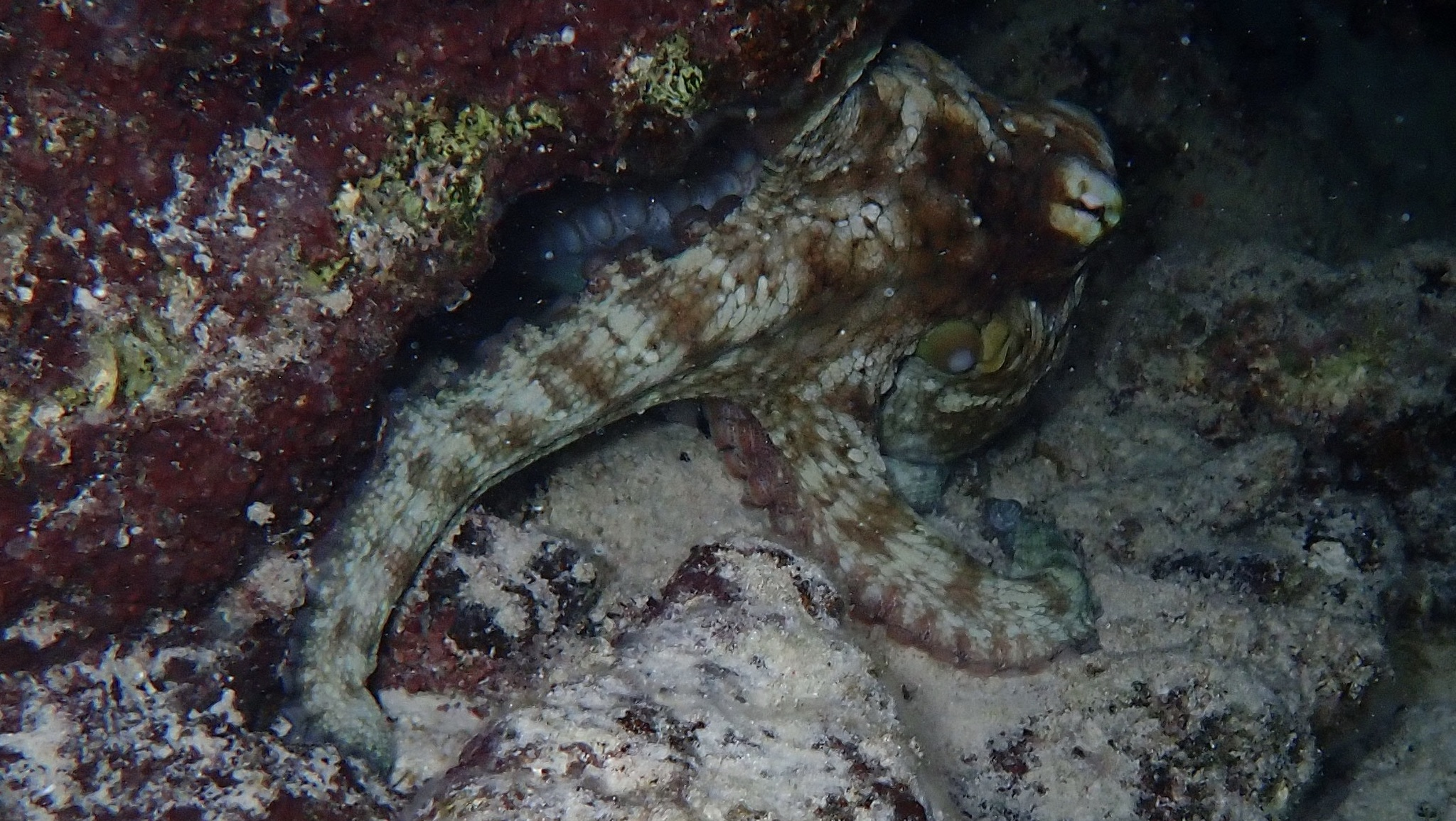

Scientific classification
- Kingdom: Animalia
- Phylum: Mollusca
- Class: Cephalopoda
- Order: Octopoda
- Family: Octopodidae
- Genus: Octopus
- Species: O. insularis

Binomial name
- Octopus insularis Leite & Haimovici in Leite, Haimovici, Molina & Warnke, 2008

= Octopus insularis =

Species of octopus

Octopus insularis is a species of octopus described in 2008 from individuals found off the coast of Brazil, with a potentially much larger range.

The species is described as medium in size and as a specialized generalist-opportunistic predator with a diet of mainly crustaceans, bivalves, and gastropods. Recently recognized as a separate species from O. vulgaris, O. insularis has been found to be different in physiology and reproductive behavior.

== Description ==
The octopus is described as red-brown in color, relatively medium in size, with arms that are proportionately compact.

O. insularis was previously unrecognized as distinct from the species O. vulgaris, but various physiological differences have since been recorded, including relatively shorter arms, a deeper web, fewer hectocotylus suckers, a stronger beak, smaller spermatophores, and maturing at a smaller body size.

== Distribution ==
O. insularis is known to be found off the coasts of Brazil and Gulf of Mexico. There are occurrence records as far north as Florida, with multiple publications in process. The name insularis was given, due to the species' insular distribution, living near islands such as Fernando de Noronha, Saint Peter, and Saint Paul. The octopus is known to live in shallow waters in a variety of habitats, such as rocky, muddy, or sandy sea bottoms, sandstone, coral, or flat biogenic reefs, algae patches, tide pools, and intertidal rocky beds.

== Ecology ==
=== Feeding ===
O. insularis is considered a specialized generalist-opportunistic predator and preys mostly on crustaceans, bivalves, and gastropods. Research has suggested that larger specimens still tend to prefer catching small crabs, which are easier to find, catch, and eat, over larger crabs and lobsters, making the octopus a "time-minimizing forager", as opposed to a "rate-maximizing forager".

=== Reproduction ===
Spawning takes place in the winter months, and individuals grow and mature in annual cycles. The gonadal development of O. insularis been described as similar to that of O. vulgaris, though differences include the former's relatively smaller gonads, lower fecundity, year round production/release of spermatophores, and group-synchronous ovulation, which are thought to be related to the species' shorter lifespan and less variety in local environmental conditions.
