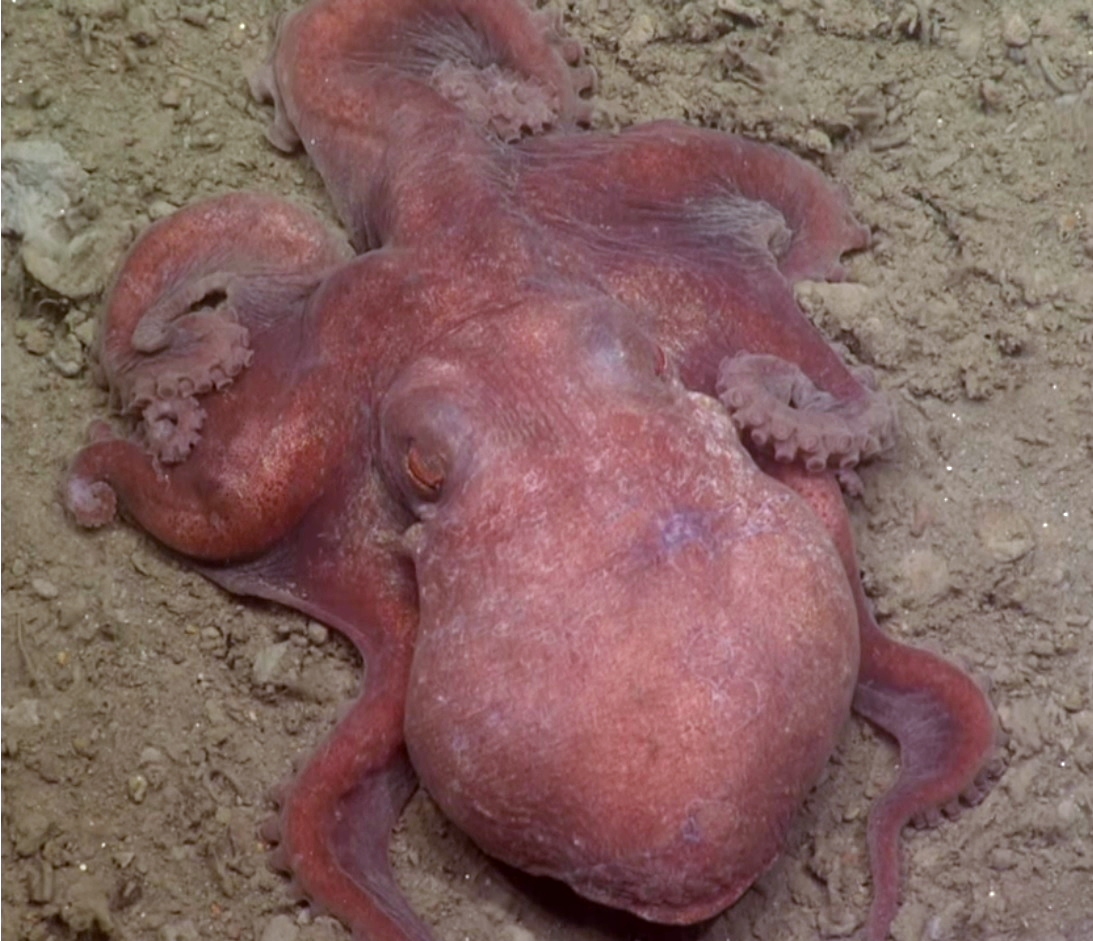

Conservation status
- Least Concern (IUCN 3.1)

Scientific classification
- Kingdom: Animalia
- Phylum: Mollusca
- Class: Cephalopoda
- Order: Octopoda
- Family: Octopodidae
- Genus: Octopus
- Species: O. californicus

Binomial name
- Octopus californicus S. S. Berry, 1911

Synonyms
- Polypus californicus

= Octopus californicus =

Species of octopus

Octopus californicus (commonly the North Pacific bigeye octopus or orange bigeye octopus) is an octopus in the family Octopodidae. It is provisionally assigned to the genus Octopus, but some scholars have concluded it belongs in other genera. O. californicus was first documented by S. Stillman Berry in 1911.

== Description ==
Octopus californicus is medium-sized and has a body up to 14 cm in diameter, with arms up to 30.5 cm in length; it has a mantle length of around 140 millimeters and maximum total length of 40 centimeters. It is soft-skinned, with large eyes, a rough body, and star shaped patches on the skin. Its diet is composed of fish, shrimp, and crabs.

== Reproduction ==
The eggs of O. californicus incubate for a maximum of ten months. They hatch looking like miniature adults, with no juvenile stage. Females spawn around 100 to 500 eggs at once.

== Distribution ==
Octopus californicus live in the northeastern Pacific Ocean, between Baja California and the Gulf of Alaska. The species has also been reported near Russia and in the Sea of Japan. They live between 100 and 900 meters, making them a deep sea species.
