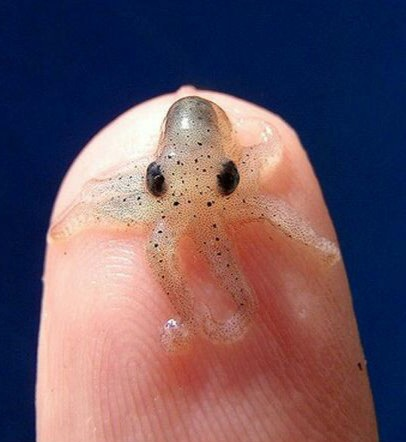
- Octopus wolfi on a human fingertip

Conservation status
- Least Concern (IUCN 3.1)

Scientific classification
- Kingdom: Animalia
- Phylum: Mollusca
- Class: Cephalopoda
- Order: Octopoda
- Family: Octopodidae
- Genus: Octopus
- Species: O. wolfi

Binomial name
- Octopus wolfi (Wülker, 1913)

Synonyms
- Polypus wolfi Wülker, 1913

= Octopus wolfi =

Species of cephalopods

Octopus wolfi, the star-sucker pygmy octopus, is the smallest known octopus. It is found in fairly shallow waters in the western Pacific. It is characterised by a pattern of "papillate fringes" around the edge of the suckers near the arm tip.

Its length is less than 2.5 cm (1 in) and it weighs less than 1 g (0.04 oz). It is found in the western Pacific Ocean at depths between 3–30 metres (9.8–98.4 ft).
