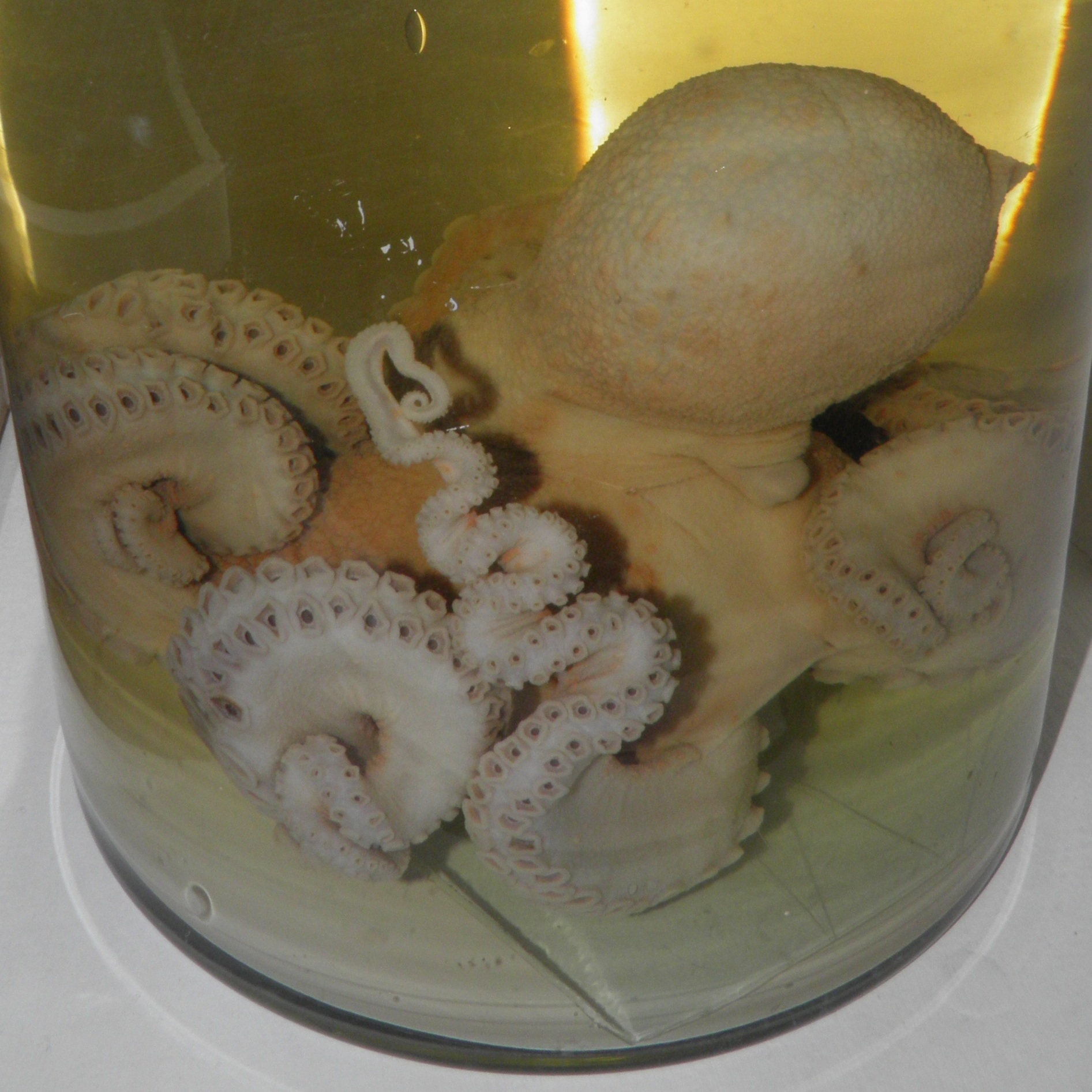

Conservation status
- Least Concern (IUCN 3.1)

Scientific classification
- Kingdom: Animalia
- Phylum: Mollusca
- Class: Cephalopoda
- Order: Octopoda
- Family: Octopodidae
- Genus: Octopus
- Species: O. conispadiceus

Binomial name
- Octopus conispadiceus Sasaki, 1917

= Octopus conispadiceus =

Species of octopus

Octopus conispadiceus (commonly the chestnut octopus) is a species of long-ligula octopus, provisionally placed in the genus Octopus. It was first described by Madoka Sasaki in 1917 based on specimens bought at a fish market in Sapporo, Japan.

== Description ==
O. conispadiceus is large, with a mantle length of up to 210 millimeters and a total length of at least 120 centimeters; its arms are moderate in length, around three times the length of the mantle. There are 140 to 150 suckers on each arm in males and 170 to 190 in females, and suckers are larger in males than females. O. conispadiceus is firm and muscular, with smooth skin, and light gray-blue in color with a white line across its head. It has seven rows of teeth and an ink sac. O. conispadiceus has small eyes.

== Distribution ==
O. conispadiceus is found in cold temperate waters off northern Japan and the Kuril Islands. It is a benthic shelf species, living from depths of around 50 to 100 meters, mostly in sandy or muddy substrates.

== Life cycle ==
O. conispadiceus reaches maturity quickly, around 10 to 11 months in cold waters. Juveniles look much like adults, but have a different skin texture. The species has a short life span, with estimates between under two years and three to four years. Females lay from 400 up to 1,200 eggs at a time; the eggs are very large, up to 28 millimeters. The size of the eggs suggests that hatchlings are benthic.

== Use by humans ==
O. conispadiceus is fished commercially in Japan. It is the second most common species of octopus in fish markets in Hokkaido, and is sometimes bycatch in gillnet fishing, especially in Russia
