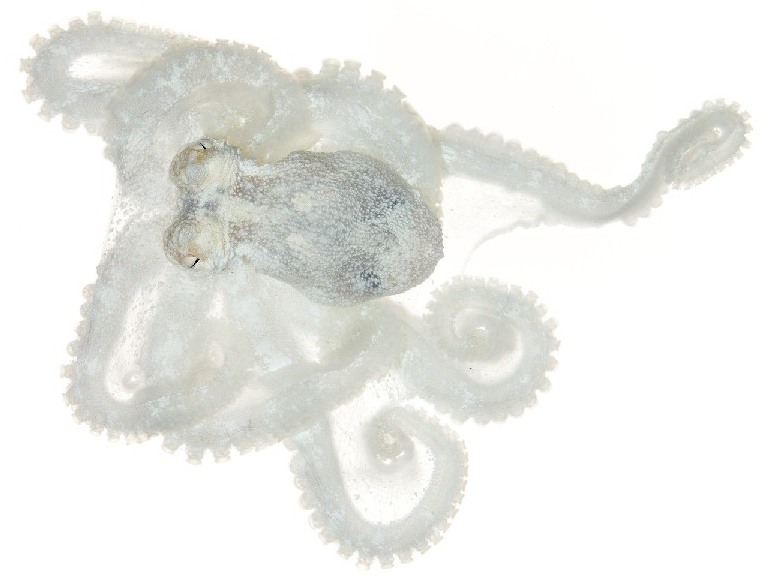

Scientific classification
- Kingdom: Animalia
- Phylum: Mollusca
- Class: Cephalopoda
- Order: Octopoda
- Family: Octopodidae
- Genus: Octopus
- Species: O. laqueus

Binomial name
- Octopus laqueus Kaneko & Kubodera, 2005

= Octopus laqueus =

Species of octopus

Octopus laqueus is a small octopus species in the family Octopodidae, first described from Okinawa, Japan, in 2005 by Kaneko and Kubodera. The species name Laqueus refers to the lace-like pattern on the webs on the arms, the reason for adopting the Japanese common name Sodefuridako; however, due to its social tolerance, it is also informally known as the Friendly Octopus. The species is associated with shallow, intertidal rocky reefs and coastal waters across the Indo-Pacific. It is distinguished by its thin web margins, papillae, white mantle spots, and a lack of arm autotomy. They are considered a pygmy species due to their fast maturity at a very small mantle length. O. laqueus has likely been unreported or overlooked due to this and its insignificant commercial importance. Genetic research later supported its classification as a distinct species by using the mitochondrial DNA COI genes. Sodefuridako has acquired a scientific interest due to its observed social tolerance and unique morphology.

== Description ==
O. laqueus is described as a small octopus with an ovoid mantle, larger eyes, and long arms connected by thin webbing. They have a total length of around 12-22cm. Mature mantle length in individuals is approximately 23.6-48.2mm, while their head is seen to 50.8% narrower than the mantle. The arms are significantly longer, extending 3.0-4.9 times beyond the mantle. It follows a distinctive 4-3-2-1 formula, where dorsal arms are shortest. A shallow, thin, transparent webbing connects each arm and reaches the arm's tip. Dark brown bands run along each arm and can be seen after fixation. On each arm, two rows of suckers run the length, with a sucker count that can range from 86 to 160. Octopus laqueus shows no arm autotomy.

The species is also distinguishable by its coloring, papillae, and textured skin. Their body color is seen to be a pale purple or pink with white spots along the dorsal mantle, in only live animals, but it varies among individuals. When threatened, it is known to change to red or brown. Their surface has a unique, irregular texture that contains small, low-lying warts. Each eye has one papilla, a raised skin bump, above it to help create more texture for camouflage. [5] Like other cephalopods, O. laqueus can rapidly change its skin color by using its chromatophores. Dynamic skin patterning has also been observed by a chromatic pulse display when the species forages.

The reproduction and internal anatomy of O. laqueus have many distinctive traits that distinguish this species. Internally, they have a radula with seven transverse rows of teeth along with two rows of marginal plates. Their gills are a very distinctive characteristic as they only have 5-6 lamellae per demibranch. A very developed ink sac was observed, as well as an ovoid-shaped digestive gland. Reproductively, O. laqueus reproduces sexually and is gonochoric. Males have a specialized hectotylized third arm, containing 81-97 suckers, to aid in the production of spermatophores. Females produce several small eggs, ranging from over 1000. Hatchings are planktonic and hatch with arms about 47% of their mantle size and 3 suckers.

== Distribution / Habitat ==
Octopus laqueus was originally found in Okinawa in the Ryukyu Islands of Japan. Additional research has confirmed occupation in the greater Indo-Pacific, reaching Pulau Tinggi, Johor, Malaysia, and Indonesia. Species were collected from intertidal shallow rocky reefs and coastal waters, depths reaching to 18m. Individuals are benthic, living on the seafloor in sand, rocks, and reefs.

== Behavior ==
Individuals' behavior is shown to be nocturnal, but very active at night, and focuses on foraging and feeding. During the day, they are found to be hiding in dens or holes, while at night observed foraging among reef rubble or sand, looking for small crustaceans.Chromatic pulse displays, dark patch moves from the mantle towards the arm, are seen during foraging.These aids in stopping and probing crevices to help hunt. As a small species, O. laqueus is vulnerable to bigger species like Octopus ornatus.

In addition to its daily behavior, individuals have an unusual observed social tolerance. Octopuses are known to be solitary animals, but in the wild, they are found in proximity to one another, while in labs, they show little aggression or cannibalism when sharing tanks. Although they suggest a sense of tolerability, individuals will still choose a solitary den when given the chance.Octopus laqueus has a unique behavior that has initiated research. They show a two-stage sleep behavior, including both quiet and active sleep. During quiet sleep, species appear white, motionless, with closed eyes, and its body is flattened. About every hour, it is stopped by short active sleep periods. During this stage, they show flashes of coloration, and their brain activity has lower levels during quiet sleep than during active sleep.

== Importance ==
Octopus laqueus is important scientifically and ecologically because, since its first discovery, it has helped contribute to the research on the diversity of cephalopods in the Indo-Pacific region. O. laqueus has very distinctive morphological traits that can be used to identify more species or a deeper understanding of octopuses.With its unusual social and sleep behavior, O. laqueus has become the center of studies to help analyze octopus sleep while linking it to humans.
