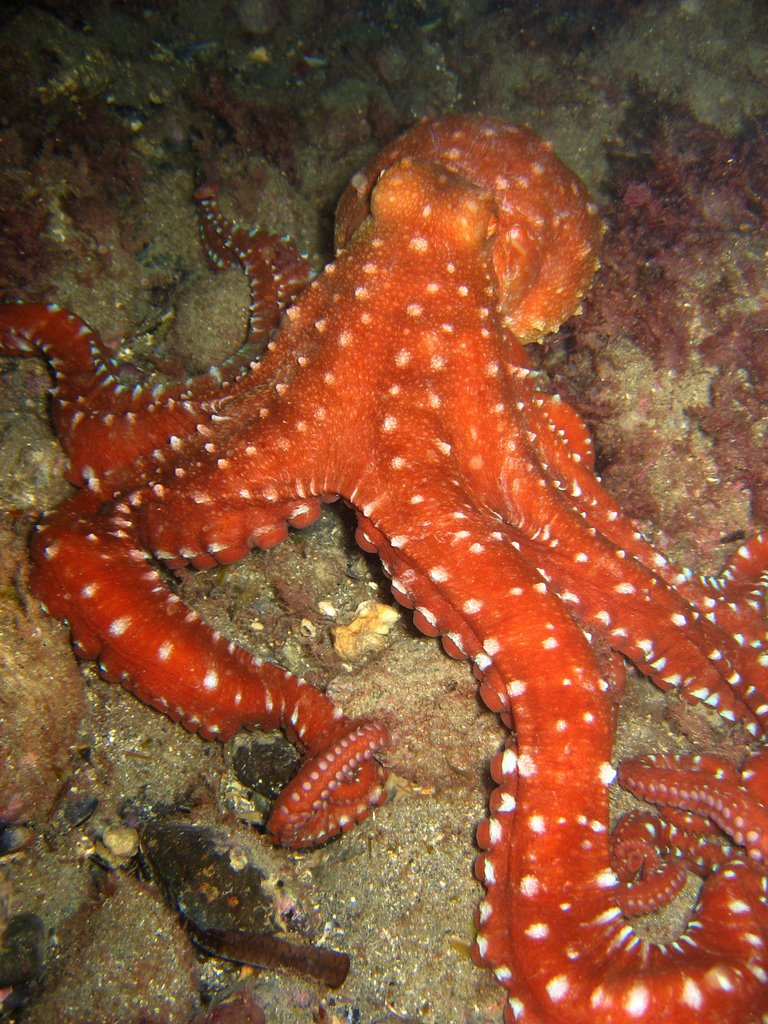
- Callistoctopus macropus

Conservation status
- Least Concern (IUCN 3.1)

Scientific classification
- Kingdom: Animalia
- Phylum: Mollusca
- Class: Cephalopoda
- Order: Octopoda
- Family: Octopodidae
- Genus: Pinnoctopus
- Species: P. macropus

Binomial name
- Pinnoctopus macropus (Risso, 1826)

Synonyms
- Octopus macropus Risso, 1826; Callistoctopus macropus (Risso, 1826); Polypus macropus (Risso, 1826); Octopus didynamus Rafinesque, 1814; Octopus frayedus Rafinesque, 1814; Octopus granosus Blainville, 1826; Octopus macropodus Sangiovanni, 1829; Octopus alderii Vérany, 1851

= Pinnoctopus macropus =

Atlantic white-spotted octopus

Species of cephalopod known as the Atlantic white-spotted octopus

Pinnoctopus macropus, also known as the Atlantic white-spotted octopus, white-spotted octopus, grass octopus or grass scuttle, is a species of octopus found in shallow areas of the Mediterranean Sea, the warmer parts of the eastern and western Atlantic Ocean, the Caribbean Sea, and the Indo-Pacific region. This octopus feeds on small organisms which lurk among the branches of corals.

== Description ==
Pinnoctopus macropus grows to a mantle length of 20 cm (8 in) with a total length of 150 cm (59 in). The first pair of arms are a metre or so long, and are much longer than the remaining three pairs. The arms are all connected by a shallow web. This octopus is red, with white blotches on its body, and paired white spots on its arms. When it is disturbed, its colour becomes more intense, deimatic behaviour which may make it appear threatening to a potential predator.

== Distribution and habitat ==
Populations of Pinnoctopus macropus form a species complex found in the Mediterranean Sea, the temperate and tropical Atlantic Ocean and the Caribbean Sea. It is also present in the Pacific and Indian Oceans. It lives near the shore at depths down to about 17 m (56 ft). Its favoured habitat is sand, rubble or seagrass meadows, and it sometimes buries itself under the sand.

== Ecology ==
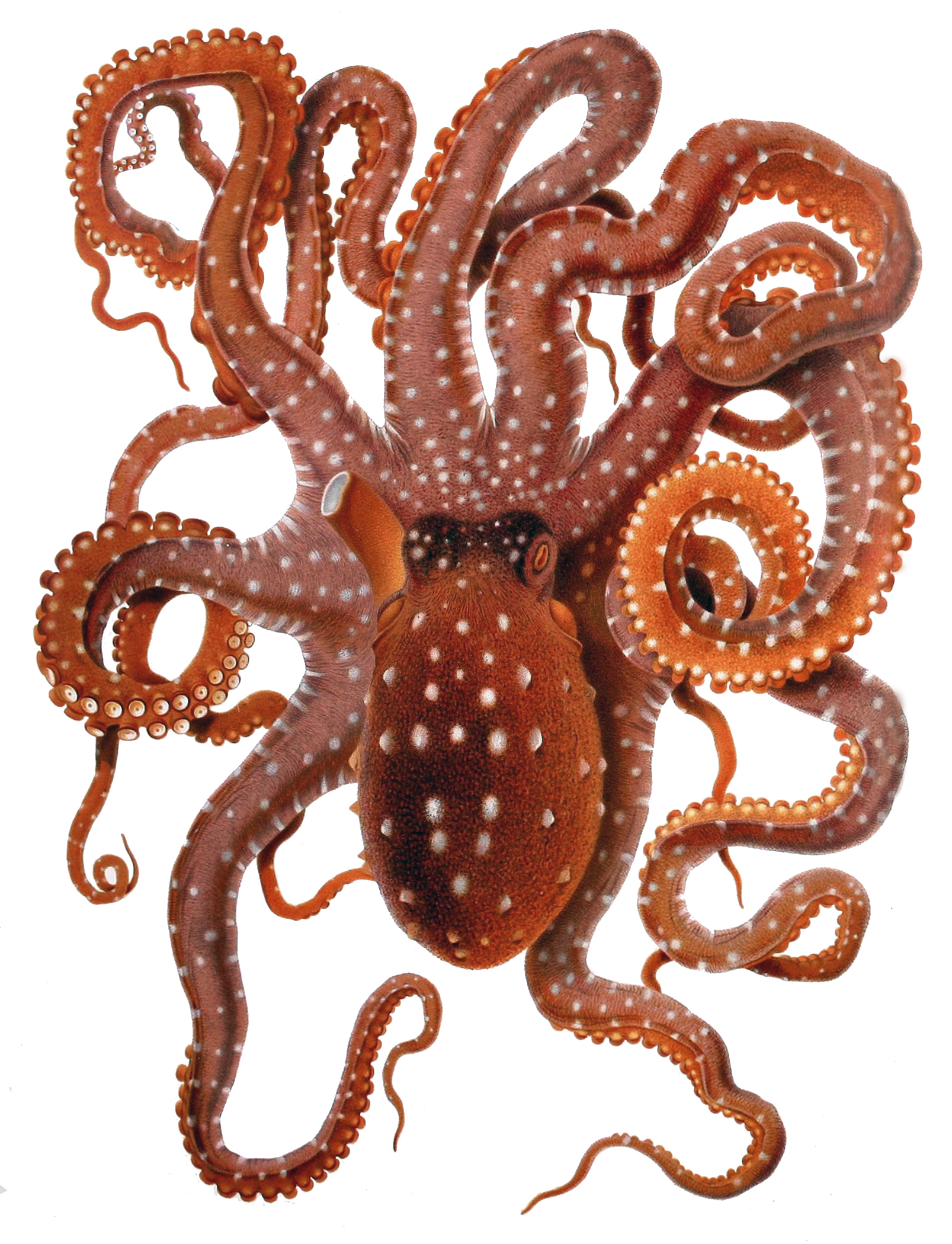
Callistoctopus macropus

Pinnoctopus macropus is more fastidious in its diet than is the common octopus (Octopus vulgaris), a species with which it shares some of its range and which feeds by day. Pinnoctopus macropus, by contrast, feeds by night. Its method of feeding is to move from one clump of branching coral to another, often Acropora or Stylophora spp.. The octopus wraps its mantle around a coral head and probes with its arms among the branches, searching for the small fish and invertebrates that seek protection there. It has been found that a number of groupers (family Serranidae) and other predatory fish associate with the octopus when it is feeding, pouncing on small organisms that are flushed from the coral head by the octopus.

For many years, the breeding habits of this octopus were not known. Then a female was observed attaching short-stalked eggs, measuring 4 by 1.2 mm (0.16 by 0.05 in), to a hard surface forming a sheet of eggs. The female then brooded the eggs, caring for them by aerating them and keeping them clean. The female octopus stopped feeding at the time the eggs were laid and died soon after they had hatched, as is common among octopus species. The planktonic larvae which emerged from the eggs were each about 5.5 mm (0.2 in) in length with short, seven-suckered arms. They fed on zooplankton such as crustacean larvae.
