= Pinnoctopus luteus =

Conservation status
- Least Concern (IUCN 3.1)

Scientific classification
- Kingdom: Animalia
- Phylum: Mollusca
- Class: Cephalopoda
- Order: Octopoda
- Family: Octopodidae
- Genus: Pinnoctopus
- Species: P. luteus

Binomial name
- Pinnoctopus luteus (Sasaki, 1929)

Synonyms
- Octopus luteus (Sasaki, 1929); Polypus luteus Sasaki, 1929; Callistoctpus luteus (Sasaki, 1929)

Species of octopus

Pinnoctopus luteus, the starry night octopus, is a species of octopus within the family Octopodidae. The species is found distributed in the Western Pacific near areas such as the Gulf of Thailand, Taiwan, Vietnam, the Philippines, Indonesia, Japan, Timor, and Hawaii, with the type locality coming from the Pescadore Islands of Taiwan. Habitats include sandy seafloors, seaweed, and rubble areas to forage for prey at depths up to 82 metres (270 ft). The species is reddish brown in color with several white spots, with a max length of 70 cm (28 in), and a mantle length of 12.5 cm (4.9 in).

== Conservation ==
Pinnoctopus luteus is targeted by fisheries, such as those in the Philippines, and is caught as bycatch throughout its range, however the full extent of this single known threat is unknown to be causing any notable effects on the species due to a lack of information. It is known to have a large range however, which as lead it to be assessed as 'Least concern' by the IUCN Red List in 2014.
