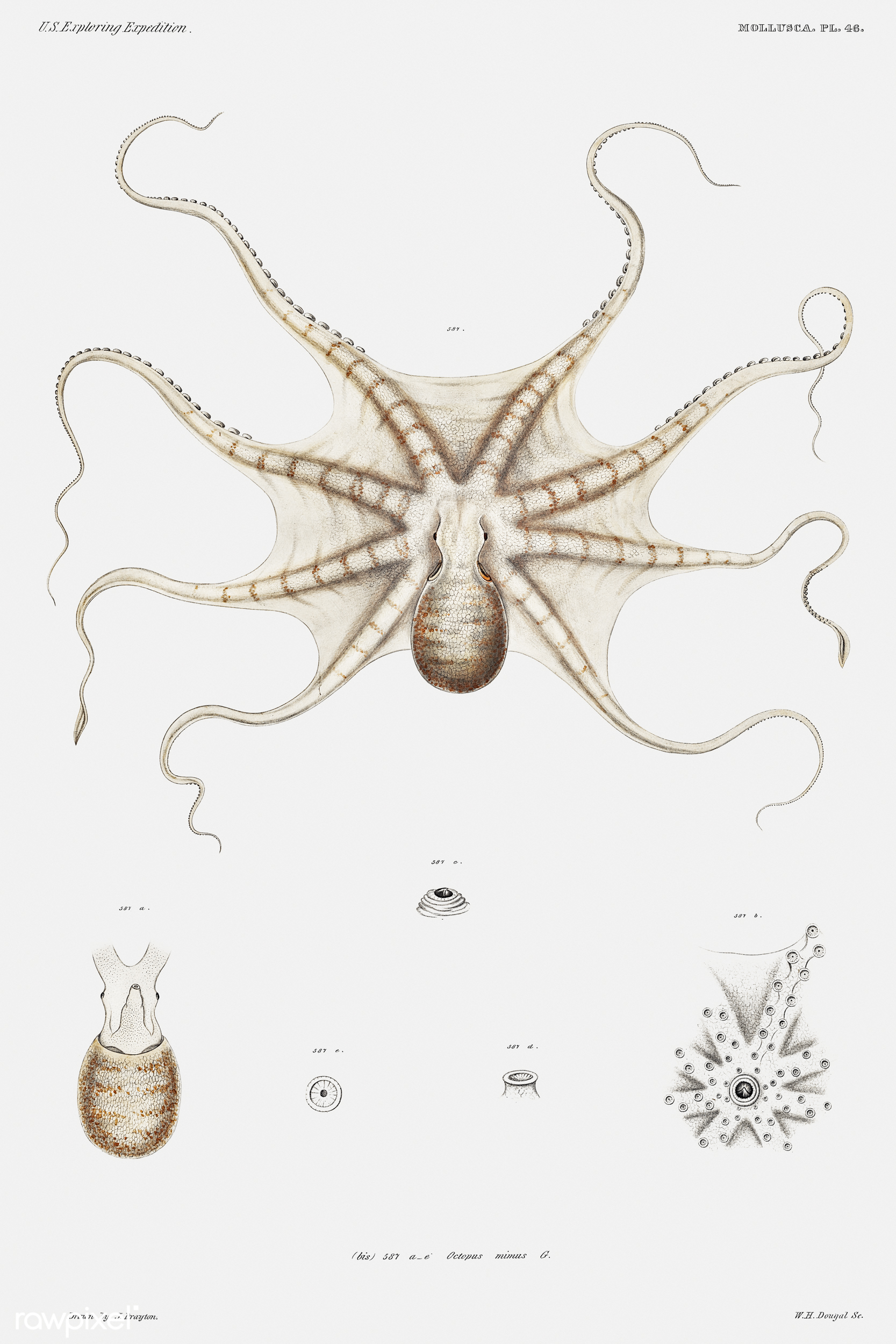

Conservation status
- Least Concern (IUCN 3.1)

Scientific classification
- Kingdom: Animalia
- Phylum: Mollusca
- Class: Cephalopoda
- Order: Octopoda
- Family: Octopodidae
- Genus: Octopus
- Species: O. mimus

Binomial name
- Octopus mimus Gould, 1852

= Octopus mimus =

Gould octopus

Species of mollusc

Octopus mimus (Gould octopus) is commonly found between northern Peru and northern Chile. The species is relatively large with a round sacciform mantle without fins. The arms are moderately large, approximately 4 times longer than the mantle. The 3rd arm on the right holds the short, thin copulatory organ in males. The color ranges, with individuals commonly speckled a mix of gray, yellow, black, green. It is primarily benthic, living in rocky substrates and kelp forests until depths of 200 m. The species is dioecious, breeding throughout the year with one or two peaks depending on the latitude. After mating the female cares for the eggs letting her body deteriorate until death. This animal grows up to 115 cm in length and 3.7 kg in females and 107 cm in length and 4.4 kg in males. Juveniles can double in size every 30 to 60 days. The Gould octopus is an opportunistic predator feeding primarily on crustaceans, mollusks, fish, and echinoderms. This species is commonly fished in Peru and Chile. Semi-Moist diets provide the best growth efficiency for the octopus mimus while also being feasibly sustainable.
