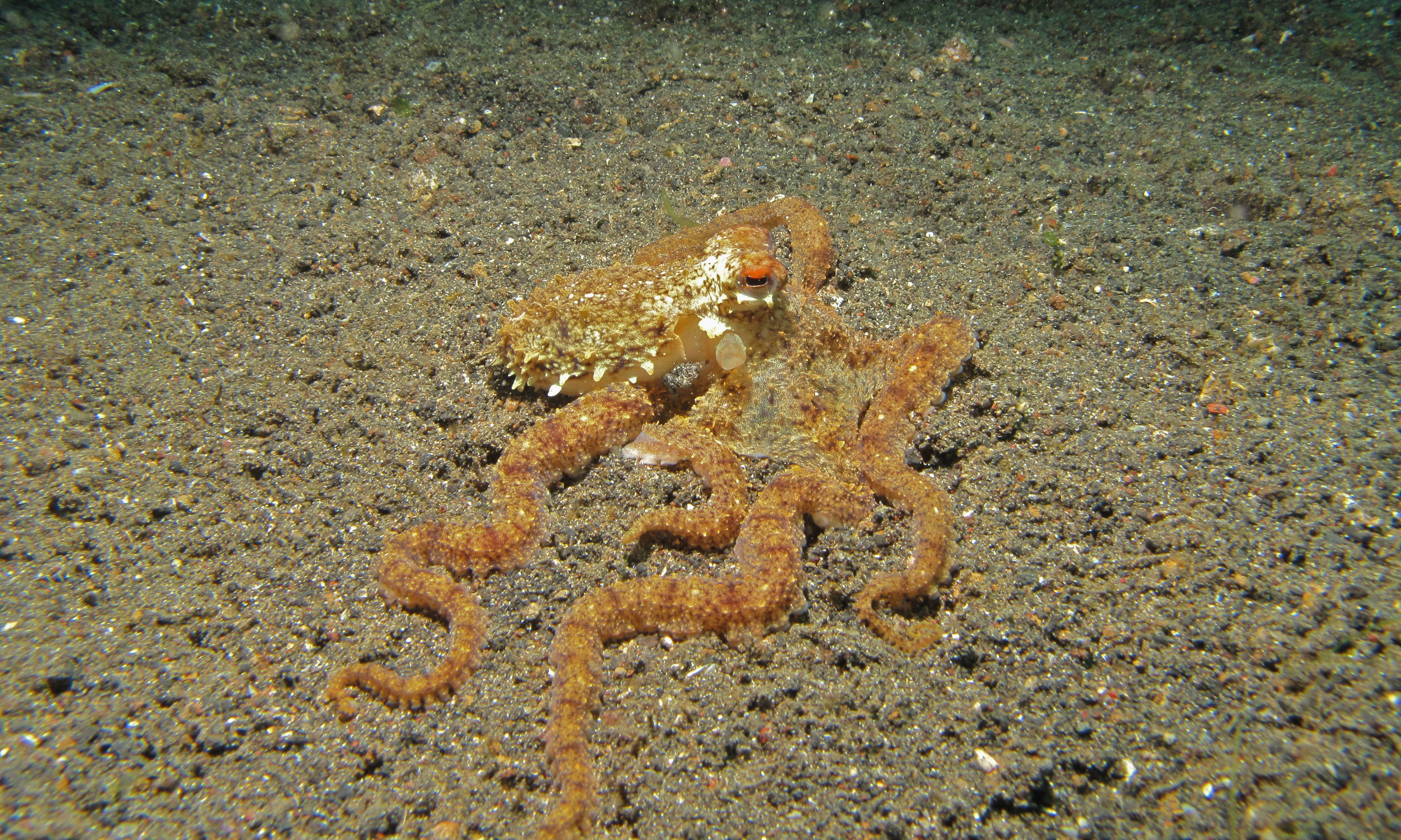
- Macrotritopus defilippi

Scientific classification
- Kingdom: Animalia
- Phylum: Mollusca
- Class: Cephalopoda
- Order: Octopoda
- Family: Octopodidae
- Genus: Macrotritopus; Grimpe, 1922

Type species
- Octopus gracilis accepted as Macrotritopus equivocus (type by original designation) Verrill, 1884

= Macrotritopus =

Genus of octopuses

Macrotritopus is a poorly known genus of octopuses in the family Octopodidae. As it stands, Macrotritopus contains two valid described species, Macrotritopus defilippi from the NE Atlantic and Mediterranean, and Macrotritopus beatrixi from the Caribbean and SW Atlantic. Two poorly described, unresolved taxa are known only from planktonic hatchlings (Macrotritopus equivocus and M. scorpio), and a further three undescribed Indo-Pacific species may be attributable to this genus.

The genus Macrotritopus was described by Grimpe (1922) for the single planktonic specimen of Octopus gracilis Verill, 1884, the name referring to the very long third arm pair on the paralarvae. Given that O. gracilis Verill, 1884 was a junior homonym of O. gracilis Souleyet, 1852, authors Joubin & Robson (1929) replaced it with Octopus (Macrotritopus) equivocus, with Macrotritopus regarded as a subgenus at that time, these authors also described M. danae. For a time these Macrotritopus species (all known from paralarvae) were misidentified as juveniles of Scaeurgus unicirrhus. Researchers in the late 1970s/early 1980s proved that Macrotritopus paralarvae from the Atlantic grew into the previously described Octopus deflippi Verany, 1851, thus connecting the juveniles with the adults (and moving Octopus deflippi to genus Macrotritopus). Therefore, the type species of Macrotritopus (M. equivocus) is a juvenile, and M. defillipi was the only species where the adult form was known (until the 2018 description of M. beatrixi). The presence of "Macrotritopus larvae" off South Africa and the Indo‑West Pacific from Australia to Hawaii indicates that there may be a number of yet to be described species within this genus.

== Description ==
The genus Macrotritopus are small octopus with elongate-ovoid mantle, and with long and slender arms 4-7 times the mantle length and with the third arm pair distinctly longer than the others (and with the dorsal arm pair always shortest). The arms are also capable of autotomy near the arm bases, have only very shallow webbing, and the males have a very small hectocotylus on the third right arm (hectocotylus length <3% the arm length). Molecular work which includes Macrotritopus sp. from the SW Atlantic (possibly M. beatrixi) has recently shown that the genus groups very closely with Thaumoctopus mimicus and Wunderpus photogenicus, which are also long-armed species living in shallow sandy environments.

== Species ==
- Macrotritopus defilippi (Vérany, 1851), Type species of genus, restricted to NE Atlantic and Mediterranean (Macrotritopus danae Joubin & Robson, 1929 is considered a synomym).
- Macrotritopus equivocus (Robson, 1929) (taxon inquirendum, juvenile: identity unresolved)
- Macrotritopus scorpio (Berry, 1920) (taxon inquirendum, unresolved, potential name for West Atlantic "defillipi")
- Macrotritopus beatrixi (Guerrero-Kommritz & Rodriguez-Bermudez, 2018), Described for adult Macrotritopus from the southern Caribbean, it is probably a junior synonym of M. scorpio, but this couldn't be determined by the authors, who thus chose to allocate it a new name.
