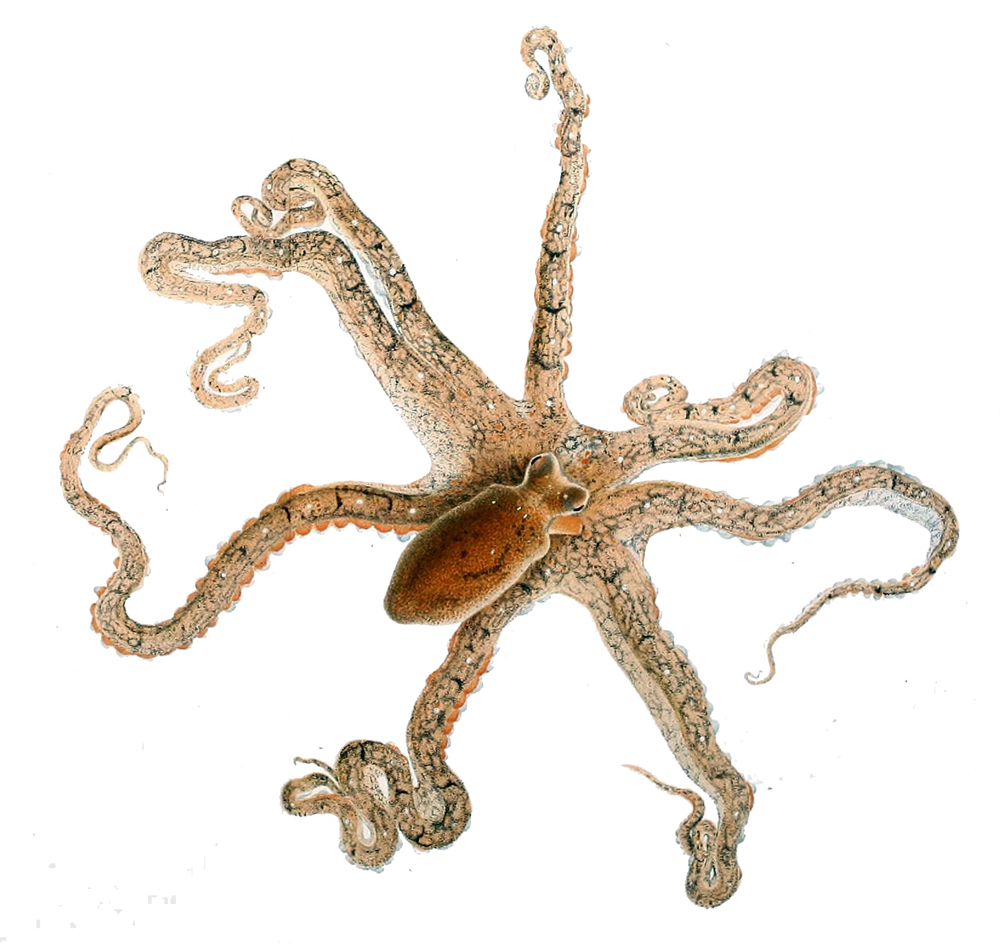

Conservation status
- Least Concern (IUCN 3.1)

Scientific classification
- Kingdom: Animalia
- Phylum: Mollusca
- Class: Cephalopoda
- Order: Octopoda
- Family: Octopodidae
- Genus: Macrotritopus
- Species: M. defilippi

Binomial name
- Macrotritopus defilippi (Vérany, 1851)

Synonyms
- Macrotritopus danaRobson, 1929; Macrotritopus danaeJoubin & Robson, 1929; Macrotritopus kempi Robson, 1929; Macrotritopus scorpio(Berry, 1920); Octopus dana Robson, 1929; Octopus defilippi Vérany, 1851; Octopus equivocus Robson, 1929; Octopus kempi Robson, 1929; Octopus scorpio (Berry, 1920); Polypus scorpio Berry, 1920

= Macrotritopus defilippi =

Species of mollusc

Macrotritopus defilippi, commonly known as the Lilliput longarm octopus or the Atlantic longarm octopus, is a small species of octopus, a marine cephalopod mollusc of the order Octopoda.

This species occurs in the Atlantic Ocean, the Mediterranean Sea and the Indian Ocean. Its typical habitat is shallow sandy areas. Its yellowish-brown colouration enables it to blend into its surroundings making it well-camouflaged when stationary. In the Caribbean it has been found that when it moves around, it does so in such a way as to closely resemble the swimming behaviour of the plate fish (Bothus lunatus), a bottom-dwelling flounder which inhabits the same waters.

== Description ==
Macrotritopus defilippi is a small octopus with relatively long arms and a mantle length of up to 90 mm (3.5 in). As is the case in most octopuses, the skin is variable in colour. It is usually either plain or speckled and closely matches the colour of its surroundings, the sandy plains on which it lives. Where the substrate includes gravel among the sand, the mottled pattern is often larger, there can be small papillae (fleshy protuberances) on the skin, and some light and dark barring on the arms. In some circumstances a white leucophore has been observed on the mantle tip; this may provide a disruptive camouflage when there are white pebbles in the vicinity. Like other octopuses, this species is able to vary its appearance to match its surroundings; when an individual is stationary on the sandy seabed, its colouring, patterning, and even brightness, so closely match the surroundings that the animal is very difficult to discern. This octopus can also bury itself in the substrate without leaving any visual trace of its position.

== Distribution ==
Macrotritopus defilippi has been reported from the Atlantic Ocean, including the Caribbean Sea, the Mediterranean Sea, the northern Indian Ocean and the coast of Somalia.

== Behaviour ==
Macrotritopus defilippi is well camouflaged on a sandy seabed, but it is a predator and needs to move around in order to feed. When it does this, its camouflage breaks down. Humann and DeLoach (2002) reported that Macrotritopus defilippi sometimes swam backwards in a normal octopus-style but that on other occasions, it moved forwards in a flattened position with its arms streaming beside it, making it superficially resemble a flatfish. The octopus swims close to the contours of the sand surface, even hugging ripples in the sand, so that no shadows are formed. Macrotritopus defilippi has a unique skin microbiome that helps protect it from harmful bacteria in its environment. Studies have shown that its skin harbors specific bacterial communities, including members of the Flavobacteriaceae family.

Living on the same sandy plains in the Caribbean as this octopus is a small, bottom-dwelling flounder, the plate fish (Bothus lunatus). The colour of this fish is also variable and usually resembles the substrate, which makes it well-camouflaged when stationary but more visible when it moves about, at which time it engages in characteristic short bursts of swimming activity. Hanlon, Watson, & Barbosa (2010) studied Macrotritopus defilippi in the wild in the Caribbean, and consider it to be a mimic of the flounder when it swims. There are similarities in both the speed and duration of bouts of swimming, the style of movement and the posture adopted by the two. Typically, the plate fish swims for about 6 seconds (3-43s) and the octopus for 2 seconds (1–20s) and both then rest for 2 or 3 seconds (1–8s flounder, 1–13s octopus) before swimming again. Both keep close to the rippled sand contours of the seabed and the octopus keeps its eyes on the upper side of its body, which increases its resemblance to the lefteye flounder. In her study of Abdopus aculeatus, Huffard (2006) hypothesized that an octopus benefited from its mimicry of a fish by the fact that potential predators did not attack what they thought was a bony flatfish that was too large for their gape whereas a soft-bodied octopus would be more likely to be attacked. In the Pacific Ocean there are two species of octopus, Thaumoctopus mimicus and an unnamed species, which are known to mimic flounders when swimming, but Macrotritopus defilippi is the first such species known from the Atlantic Ocean.

At one time, unidentified Macrotritopus larvae characterized by having long third arms were known from the Caribbean Sea but the adult form was unknown. Only when a female was raised to maturity in the laboratory was it discovered that they were the larvae of Macrotritopus defilippi. These larvae float with their arms extended and if disturbed, dart off by jet propulsion, sometimes reaching the seabed and seeking a hole in which to hide. They may be pelagic by night and benthic by day, but seem to become less nocturnal as they get older.
