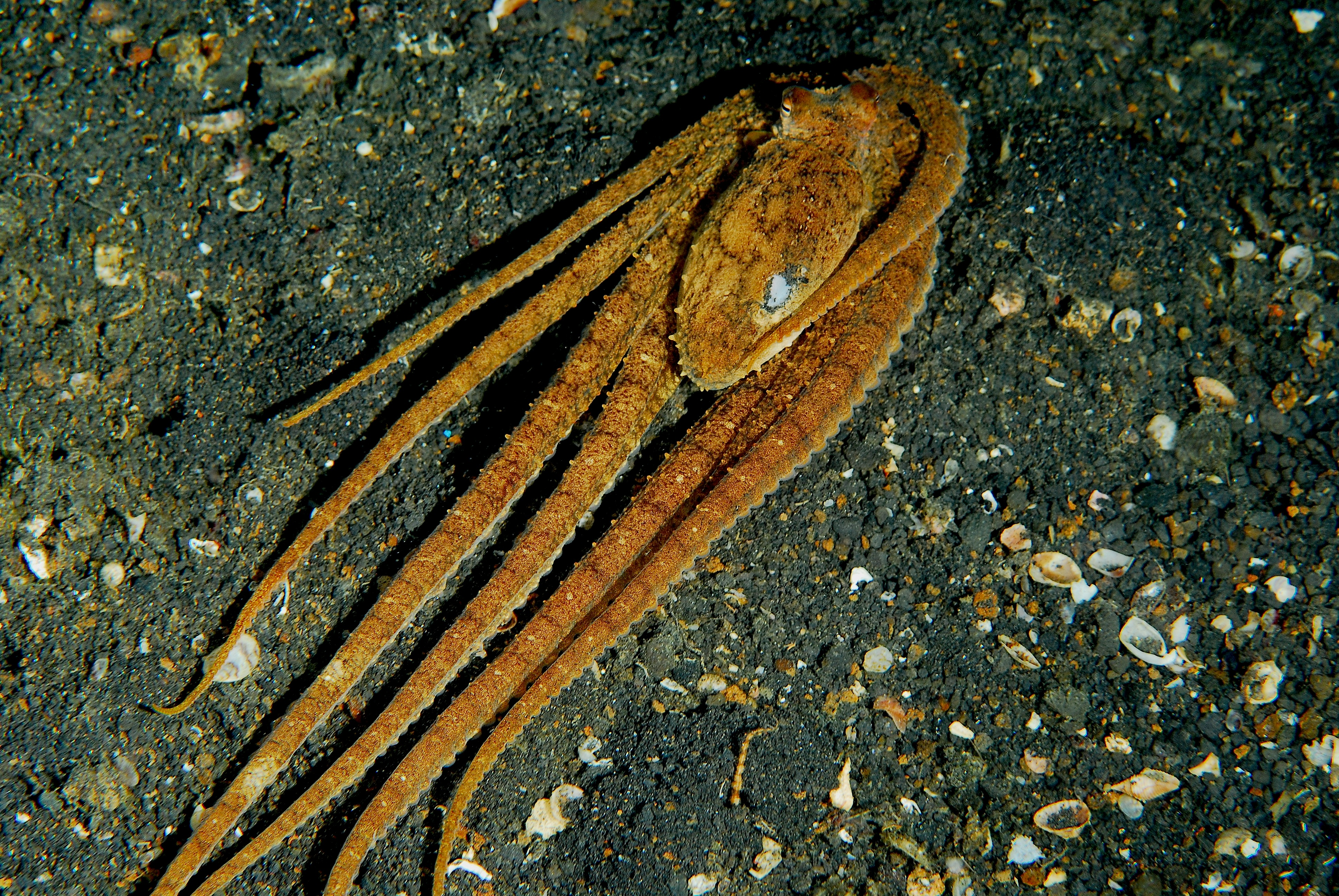
- Mimicking a flatfish

Scientific classification
- Kingdom: Animalia
- Phylum: Mollusca
- Class: Cephalopoda
- Order: Octopoda
- Family: Octopodidae
- Species: White V octopus

Binomial name
- Not yet named

= White V octopus =

Undescribed species of octopus

The white V octopus, also referred to as Octopus sp.18, or blandopus, is an undescribed species of octopus in the family Octopodidae which inhabits the Indo-Pacific. Its morphology has not been described in detail, so it has not received a binomial name, but its genetics has been studied which revealed it as a close relative of both the mimic octopus and wunderpus. Some sources consider it as a species of Abdopus.

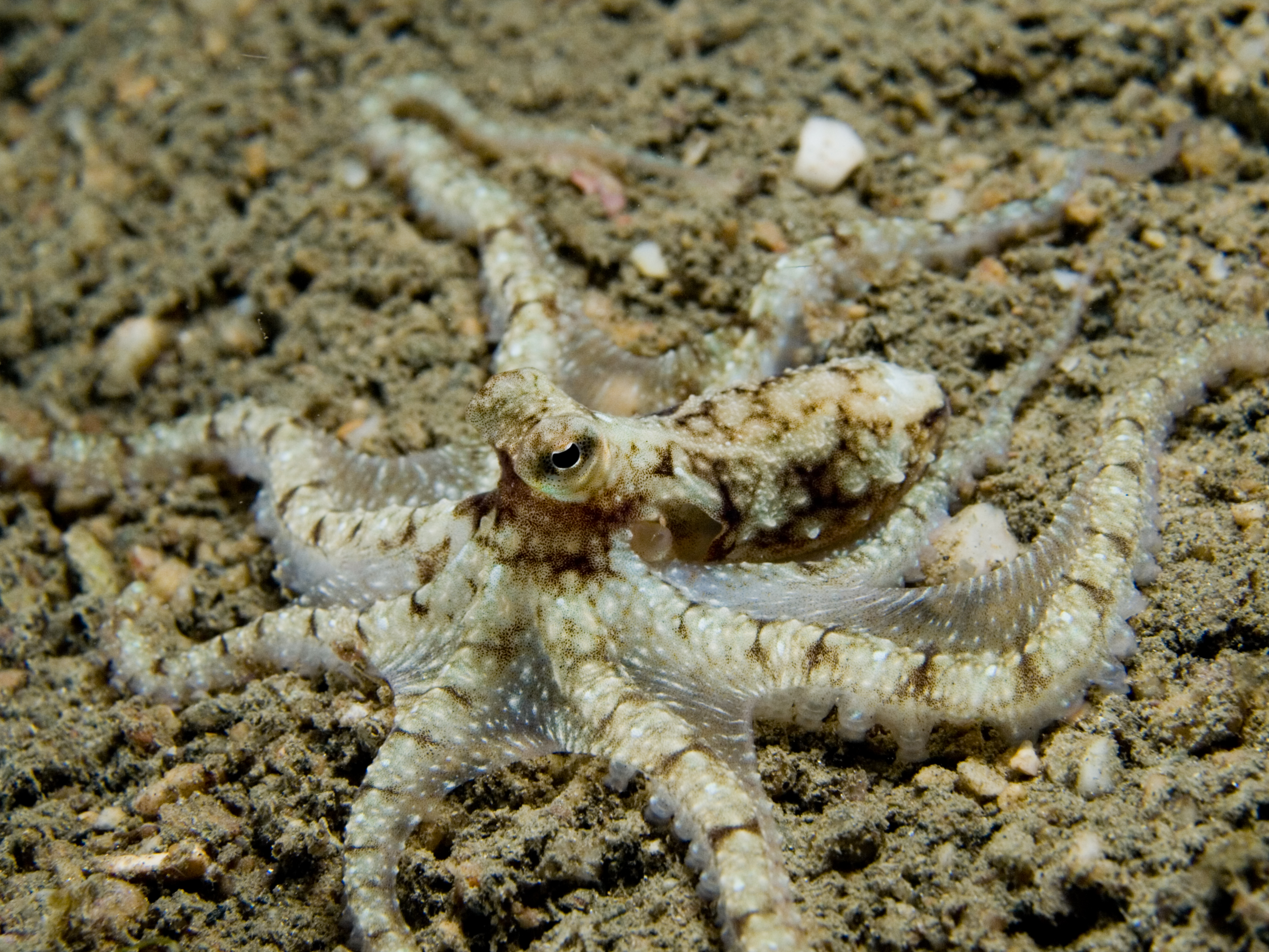
Closeup; Timor-Leste

The white V octopus is considered a small-bodied species, possessing arms which are up to 15 centimetres (5.9 in) long.

Found in marine habitats in Indonesia (such as the Lembeh Strait) and the Philippines, the white V octopus inhabits sandy substrates with a depth of less than 50 metres (160 ft). White V octopus are able to mimic flatfish, akin to its close relatives, though it remains cryptically colored during this behavior unlike the mimic octopus. It has been suggested that this species is a "high-fidelity mimic of Bothus mancus". The white V octopus only mimics flatfish when moving quickly, and seems to be a less prolific mimic than the mimic octopus. Being sympatric with both the wunderpus and mimic octopus, it is assumed that they all compete with one another, though the specifics of their ecological interaction requires further study.

The following phylogenetic tree is taken from a 2010 study by Huffard, Saarman, Hamilton, and Simison:

- - Cistopus indicus
  - Octopus cyanea
- - - Abdopus sp. 1
    - - Abdopus aculeatus
      - Abdopus sp. "Ward"
  - - "Hawaiian Long Armed Sand" octopus
    - "White V" octopus
    - - Wunderpus photogenicus
      - Thaumoctopus mimicus

The authors of this study suggested that both the white V and Hawaiian long-armed sand octopus should be included in the genus Thaumoctopus, though this would necessarily render Wunderpus as that genus' junior synonym. Alternatively, the clade is referred to as the "Long Armed Sand Octopus" clade (LASO).
