= Histoctopus =

Scientific classification
- Domain: Eukaryota
- Kingdom: Animalia
- Phylum: Mollusca
- Class: Cephalopoda
- Order: Octopoda
- Family: Octopodidae
- Genus: Histoctopus; Norman, Boucher-Rodoni & Hochberg, 2009

Type species
- Histoctopus zipkasae Norman, Boucher-Rodoni & Hochberg, 2009

Species
- Histoctopus discus Norman, Boucher-Rodoni & Hochberg, 2009; Histoctopus zipkasae Norman, Boucher-Rodoni & Hochberg, 2009

Genus of octopuses

Histoctopus is an octopus genus containing two species: Histoctopus zipkasae, the type species, and Histoctopus discus. The former is found in the south-west Pacific Ocean while the latter is found in the Indian Ocean. The three taxa were described in 2009 by Mark D. Norman, Renata Boucher-Rodoni and F. G. Hochberg in the Journal of Molluscan Studies. The genus name is derived from octopus and the Greek word histos, meaning "web" or "tissue", in reference to the membrane on the outside of the arms. The type species was named zipkasae, "after the senior author's wonderful wife, Karen Zipkas", while the name of H. discus comes from the Latin discus, meaning "plate", in reference to the large suckers.

Histoctopus are small to medium-sized octopuses with an orange-brown colouration. Each muscular arm has two rows of large suckers. Nothing is known about the life history of either species. They are found at depths of between 200 and 750 metres (660 and 2,460 ft).

The genus is most similar to genera Scaeurgus and Galeoctopus, based on morphology. However, the phylogenetic relationship between Histoctopus and other genera is unknown. The "web margins" on the arms, which are the genus's most distinctive feature and for which it is named, are found in three other octopus genera (Velodona, Graneledone and Pteroctopus), but they are readily distinguished by other characteristics. All four species inhabit the benthic zone of deep water habitat, typically deeper than 200 metres (660 ft) (and significantly deeper in the case of Graneledone), and so Norman et al. propose that the presence of the margins is the result of convergent evolution. Their function is unknown; it is possible that they act as an aid in ensnaring prey or as an aid in swimming.
