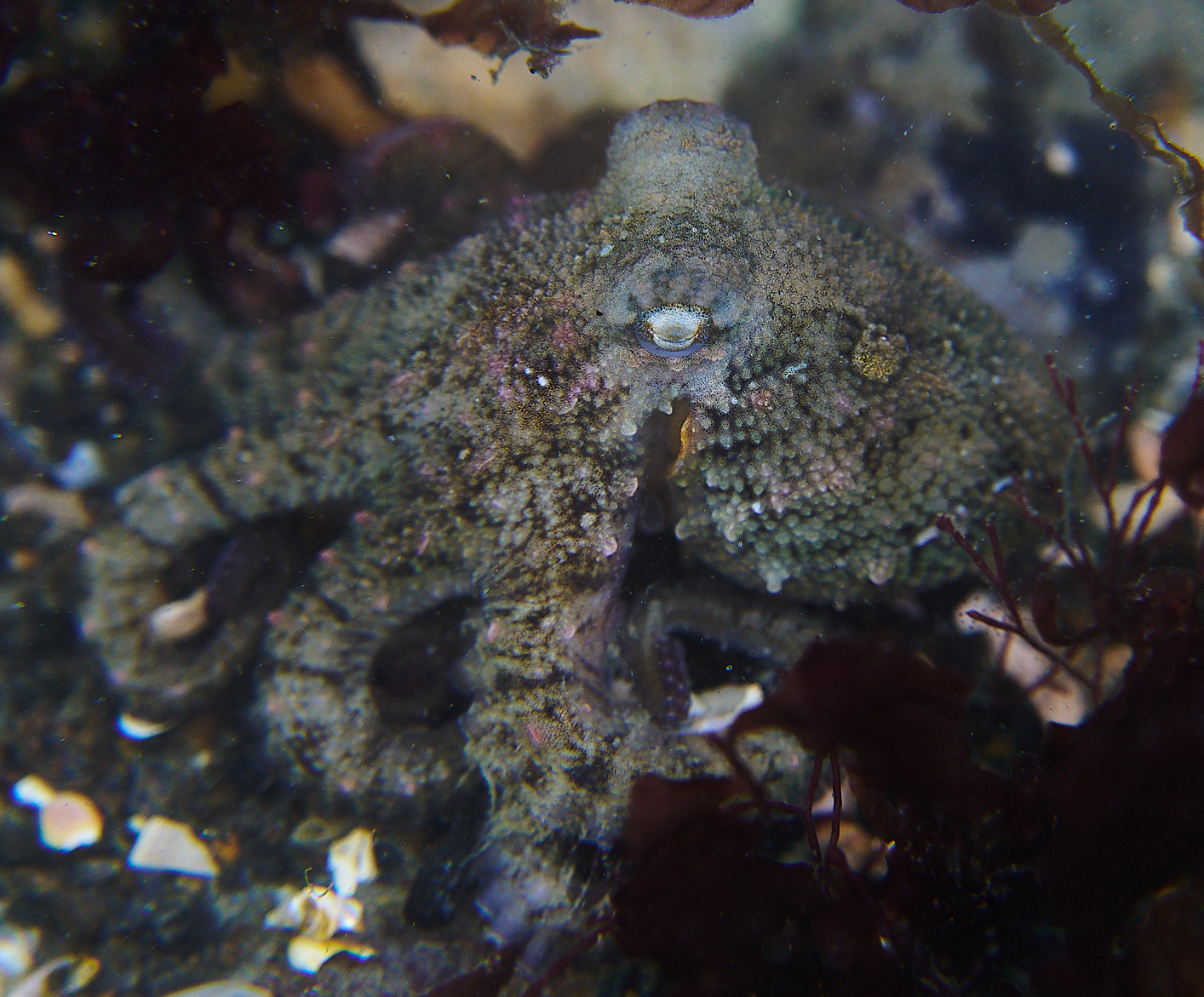

Conservation status
- Data Deficient (IUCN 3.1)

Scientific classification
- Kingdom: Animalia
- Phylum: Mollusca
- Class: Cephalopoda
- Order: Octopoda
- Family: Octopodidae
- Genus: Robsonella
- Species: R. huttoni

Binomial name
- Robsonella huttoni Benham, 1943

Synonyms
- Octopus adamsi Benham, 1944; Octopus huttoni (Benham, 1943)

= Robsonella huttoni =

Species of mollusc

Robsonella huttoni, also known as the club pygmy octopus, is a species of octopus native to New Zealand and Australia. It was first described in 1943 by the zoologist William Benham, who named it after Frederick Hutton, one of New Zealand's most prolific naturalists. As adults they are coloured reddish, orangish and greenish. They reach up to 240mm in length. They are widespread in New Zealand, but in Australia are only found in the southern regions. They live in tidal and subtidal reefs to depths of 386 metres. However, their distribution along the shore appears to depend on their age, which may be an example of an ontogenetic niche shift. Unlike many octopus, this species has a paralarvae stage, which can last 40 to 70 days. There are records of them living for up to 250 days, but likely live longer. There is little data on the conservation needs of this species, but it is possible that their distribution will be impacted by climate change.

== Taxonomy and etymology ==
Robsonella huttoni was first described in 1943 by zoologist William Benham, who was a professor emeritus at Otago University. Benham described it as Octopus huttoni from specimens collected in the Otago region of New Zealand. The specific name refers to Frederick Hutton (another zoologist), who described the first species of octopus in New Zealand (Macroctopus maorum). It was most recently redescribed in 1999 by the New Zealand marine biologist Steve O'Shea. They are commonly referred to as "club pygmy octopus".

=== Phylogeny ===
In 2020, based on combined cytochrome oxidase I, cytochrome oxidase III and 16s rRNA genetic data, the species was transferred to the genus Robsonella. The authors noted that the texture of the skin and morphology of the radula (among other features) indicated it belongs in Robsonella. It was also speculated that the species emerged sometime after the Antarctic Circumpolar Current was formed during the Cenozoic.

== Description ==
Adult male Robsonella huttoni

The adults of this species are known to reach up to 240mm in length. Especially large individuals have been recorded from the Fiordland region whilst relatively small individuals occur in southern Australia. The mantle is about 57mm long. When they are alive, they vary in colour, having been seen in reddish, orangish and greenish colour patterns. The head is strongly developed with the surface being papillose (being covered in papilla). Each of the papilla are small and rounded. There are also one to two occular cirri (hair like appendages just above the eyes). Like the head, the arms are also papillose. When the octopus is an adult, the tenth to thirteenth suckers are notably enlarged. The third arm of the male is hectocotylised (modified to store and transfer spermatophores). This arm has around 69 to 74 suckers. There are usually seven gill lamellae, but six and eight lamellae are known to occur.

=== Paralarvae ===
Robsonella huttoni egg mass found during an ocean clean up

After hatching, the paralarvae are roughly 3mm long and 1.55mm in width. The larvae have large eyes and are semitransparent in colour. The body is covered in Kölliker’s organs (patches of setae which are lost as the octopus matures), which look like small iridescent spots. The paralarvae also have between 29 and 50 chromatophores (multicellular organs that rapidly change colour) on the upper and lower surfaces throughout their bodies. The overall pattern of chromatophore placement is reportedly consistent, but may vary slightly in number.

=== Eggs ===
Each egg is coloured white and is 2.5mm long and 1mm in width. The eggs are linked to each other by strands that are up to 25.8mm long.

== Distribution and habitat ==
This species is native to New Zealand and Australia. They occur throughout New Zealand, including the subantarctic islands except for Campbell Island (and only paralarval specimens have been collected in Macquarie Island). In Australia, they are only known from Tasmania and southern Australia.

As adults, Robsonella huttoni are a merobenthic species, meaning they live on the seafloor. They are a relatively shallow species, occurring from the surface level to 386 metres in depth. Their typical habitat includes intertidal and subtidal reefs.

== Life history ==
The females have been observed laying eggs all year round, but eggs are most often laid during October to March. The eggs are laid in clumps on hard surfaces using a natural cement produced by the female. The females produced around 3800 to 6500 eggs, with each clump being about 50 to 125 eggs. In one study, the majority of eggs laid by Robsonella huttoni hatched in a single burst over two days. These eggs were incubated for 43 to 158 days, with the amount of time being temperature dependent. At higher temperatures, the development time of the embryos decreased. However, there was evidence the eggs in cooler conditions with longer incubation times tended to have greater survival rates. After the eggs hatch, the females have been recorded surviving for 7 to 42 days. During this period, their condition is very poor and deteriorates rapidly.

After hatching, R. huttoni has a planktonic paralavae stage (unlike many other octopus). During this stage, the paralarvae have been recorded living in the water column before transitioning to a benthic life style. This stage reportedly lasts 40 to 70 days. As the paralarvae grow older, their respiration rates increase. In experimental conditions, the paralarvae avoided temperatures below 15°C and temperatures above 23.1°C. As temperatures increased above 23.1°C, the paralarvae began to have spasms and denaturation of tissue before finally dying. Overall, temperatures about 25°C seem to be a major barrier for this species, although research is needed to determine if different populations of R. huttoni have differing heat tolerances.

One study found that near-shore populations had older individuals, whereas further offshore populations had younger ones. It was suggested that this is evidence the species demonstrates an ontogenetic niche shift (where a species has different diet or habitat requirements at different life stages). In this case, it was speculated that the planktonic paralarva are transported further offshore by currents, but eventually migrate further inshore as they mature.

This species has been recorded living up to 250 days, although this is likely to be an underestimation.

== Predators ==
Robsonella huttoni has been reported being preyed upon by various sea birds and fish.

== Conservation status ==
As of 2018, Robsonella huttoni is listed as "Data Deficient" by the International Union for Conservation of Nature. One study has suggested that the paralarval stages of this species are negatively affected by temperatures above 23 °C. Because of this, it is possible that changes in ocean temperature due to climate change will limit the distribution of this species. Although not fished commercially, they are sometimes caught as bycatch.
