= Euaxoctopus pillsburyae =

Map octopus

Conservation status
- Data Deficient (IUCN 3.1)

Scientific classification
- Kingdom: Animalia
- Phylum: Mollusca
- Class: Cephalopoda
- Order: Octopoda
- Family: Octopodidae
- Genus: Euaxoctopus
- Species: E. pillsburyae

Binomial name
- Euaxoctopus pillsburyae Voss, 1975

Species of molluscs

Euaxoctopus pillsburyae, commonly known as the map octopus, is a species of Euaxoctopus.

== Etymology ==
Euaxoctopus pillsburyae was first described by Gilbert Voss in 1975 after being collected by the R/V John Elliott Pillsbury. The octopus was named after the vehicle, which in turn was named for Rear Admiral John Elliott Pillsbury.

== Description ==
The mantles of this species are small, but due to a tendency of the tentacles to break off in collected samples, exact measurements of size are challenging to capture; however, the arms are noted as being "very long".

=== Distribution ===
E. pillsburyae was first described on the Tropical Western Atlantic benthic shelf off the coast of Suriname. It has since been captured in shallow waters off the northern coast of Venezuela. E. pillsburyae appears to prefer soft substrates.
