= Euaxoctopus panamensis =

Crescent octopus

Conservation status
- Data Deficient (IUCN 3.1)

Scientific classification
- Kingdom: Animalia
- Phylum: Mollusca
- Class: Cephalopoda
- Order: Octopoda
- Family: Octopodidae
- Genus: Euaxoctopus
- Species: E. panamensis

Binomial name
- Euaxoctopus panamensis Voss, 1971

Species of octopus

Euaxoctopus panamensis, commonly known as the crescent octopus, is the best described species of Euaxoctopus.

== Description ==
Little is known regarding the coloration of Euaxoctopus panamensis in life, although preserved specimens are gray in color and characterized by dark, crescent-shaped markings on the octopus' mantle, bordered by lightly colored streaks which are believed to be iridescent in life. Their mantles grow to 3.2 cm (1.3 in), and their bodies grow to a total length of 20 cm (7.9 in). Males are characterized by a hectocotylus as their third left arm which is approximately 1/3 the size of the corresponding right arm. E. panamensis is also characterized by an unusual digestive tract, featuring a left salivary gland twice the size of the right gland, and both glands fused together around the crop.

=== Distribution ===
E. panamensis is found offshore in the Gulf of Panama and Costa Rica, as far south as Ecuador. The species has been collected from 30 to 40 metres (98 to 131 ft) deep, though its true depth range is unknown. It is usually found in soft mud substrates.

== Reproduction ==
Females produce small eggs, approximately 1.4 by 0.5 millimetres (0.06 in × 0.02 in). These eggs hatch into planktonic paralarvae, identifiable due to their long second arms.
