= Macrochlaena =

Conservation status
- Data Deficient (IUCN 3.1)

Scientific classification
- Kingdom: Animalia
- Phylum: Mollusca
- Class: Cephalopoda
- Order: Octopoda
- Family: Octopodidae
- Genus: Macrochlaena; Robson, 1929
- Species: M. winckworthi

Binomial name
- Macrochlaena winckworthi (Robson, 1926)

Synonyms
- Octopus winckworthi Robson, 1926

Genus of octopuses

Macrochlaena winckworthi, Winckworth's octopus, is a little known species of octopus, it is the only species in the monotypic genus Macrochlaena, in the family Octopodidae. It was described by the British malacologist Guy Coburn Robson in 1926, the type specimens having been collected in the Gulf of Mannar, off Thoothukudi in Tamil Nadu, southeastern India.

== Description ==
Macrochlaena winckworthi is a small species of octopus with relatively short arms, the arms being 1.5-2.5 times longer than the mantle with the lateral arms being slightly longer. The web is relatively deep, being one third the length of the arms, and the web is slightly deeper between the lateral arms. There are no pouches between the arms. Each arm has two rows of small suckers n its underside, with each arm having around 65 suckers. The funnel organ has a shape described as "UU" and the gills have 8 to 10 lamellae per demibranch. The radula has 9 elements, 7 teeth rows and marginal plates and the rachidian tooth has a single lateral cusp in a symmetrical series. It possesses a small ink sac. In the males the third right arm is hectocotylised being approximately 80% of the length of the opposite arm and having 35 to 40 suckers. The terminal organ is linear and the diverticulum is simple in form with a slightly swollen shape. It has small spermatophores each being 8 to 10 mm in length, roughly one third of the length of the mantle. The head is now dsitnguished much from the mantle and the eyes are rather small. The skin is smooth and overall the animal is red-brown to purple in colour with a marbling of darker mottles. The total length of an adult is at least 93mm, the mantle length is 33mm.

== Habitat and distribution ==
Macrochlaena winckworthi was originally collected from pearl oyster beds in shallow water off the coast of Tamil Nadu in the Gulf of Mannar. It has also been collected off Java and it has been inferred that its distribution extends from India east to the Malay Archipelago in shallow waters of less than 20m in depth. It seems to have some convergent adaptations with other species of octopods which live in muddy habitats. This is a little known species and its biology and behaviour are unknown, as is its importance in any fisheries.
