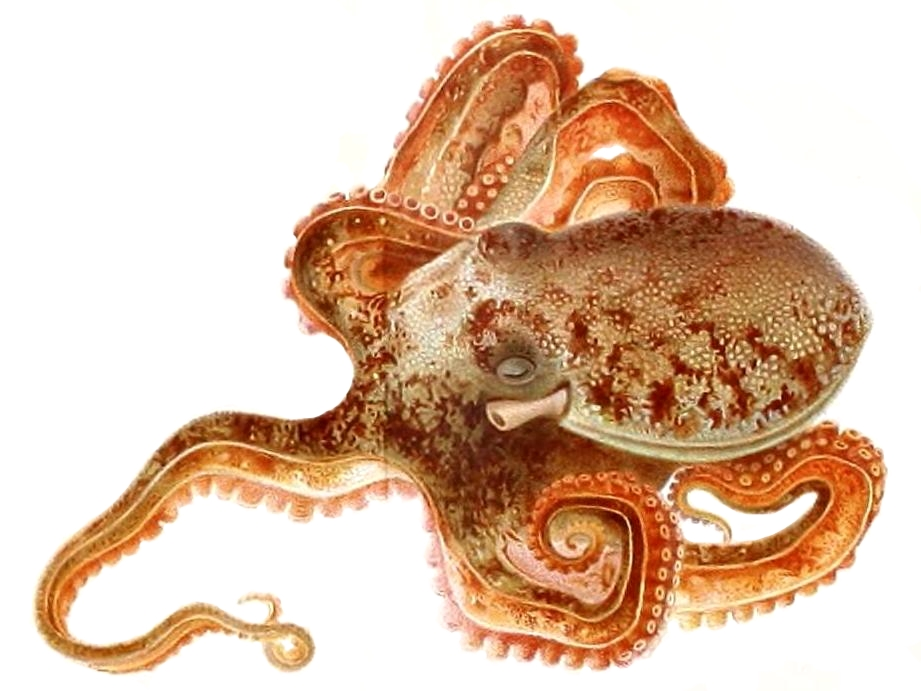

Conservation status
- Data Deficient (IUCN 3.1)

Scientific classification
- Kingdom: Animalia
- Phylum: Mollusca
- Class: Cephalopoda
- Order: Octopoda
- Family: Octopodidae
- Genus: Scaeurgus
- Species: S. unicirrhus

Binomial name
- Scaeurgus unicirrhus (d'Orbigny, 1840)

= Scaeurgus unicirrhus =

Species of deep-sea octopus

Scaeurgus unicirrhus is a benthic deep-sea octopus belonging to the family Octopodidae. It is widely distributed throughout the Mediterranean Sea and the eastern Atlantic Ocean, living between 30 and 600 m of depth. This species is known for its cryptic lifestyle, benthic habits, and morphological adaptations to deep-sea environments. It plays an important ecological role in continental slope ecosystems and has also been recorded around oceanic islands such as the Azores and Madeira.

== Morphology ==
S. unicirrhus has an oval, muscular body with a mantle length reaching up to 12 cm and arms extending to about 40 cm. The skin shows irregular papillae that provide camouflage on sandy or rocky bottoms. A distinctive characteristic is the single cirrus above each eye-hence the name "unicirrhus". Members of this genus possess two rows of suckers, a skin keel around the body margin, and males have the hectocotylus on the third left arm, unlike most other octopus species where the modified arm is the third right. According to Norman (2000), the species is typically reddish-brown, with robust arms and a tendency to inhabit soft substrates.

== Taxonomy ==
The genus Scaeurgus was described by Alcide d'Orbigny in 1840, who designated S. unicirrhus as its type species. Subsequent revisions confirmed S. unicirrhus as the only Mediterranean representative of the genus. Three additional species: S. patagiatus, S. tuber and S. jumeau are known from the Pacific Ocean.

== Habitat and distribution ==
Scaeurgus unicirrhus occurs throughout the Mediterranean Sea and along the eastern Atlantic coast from Portugal and the Azores to North Africa and southward to Senegal. It inhabits sandy, muddy or rubble substrates between 30 and 600 m of depth, sometimes occurring on hard bottoms. The species is primarily nocturnal and shelters in crevices, empty shells, or under stones during the day.

=== Azores ===
In the Azores Archipelago, S. unicirrhus was first reported in a regional synopsis of the local Octopoda fauna. Specimens were collected on upper-slope habitats, mostly between 200 and 600 m. FAO (2016) also lists the species among confirmed Atlantic records around oceanic islands.

=== Madeira ===
In the Madeira Archipelago, the species was documented through additional records expanding the cephalopod fauna of the region. The Madeiran material derives from upper-slope environments similar to those of the Azores, suggesting continuity across the Macaronesian islands.

== Behavior ==
Scaeurgus unicirrhus is a benthic predator feeding mainly on crustaceans, bivalves, gastropods and occasionally small fish. It may bury itself partially and ambush prey. Females produce small eggs, approximately 3 mm in diameter, attaching them within sheltered cavities. They brood the eggs until hatching, after which planktonic young emerge. The species likely has a biennial life cycle, with spawning occurring in spring and early summer.

== Scientific importance ==
S. unicirrhus is a relevant species for studies of cephalopod evolution and adaptation to deep-sea environments. Its wide distribution across the Mediterranean and eastern Atlantic makes it a useful biogeographic indicator. FAO (2016) provides detailed taxonomic keys, distribution data, and anatomical drawings for accurate identification.
