= Octopus variabilis =

Scientific classification
- Kingdom: Animalia
- Phylum: Mollusca
- Class: Cephalopoda
- Order: Octopoda
- Family: Octopodidae
- Genus: Octopus
- Species: O. variabilis

Binomial name
- Octopus variabilis Sasaki, 1929

Species of octopus

Octopus variabilis, commonly known as the whiparm octopus, is a benthic species found in the northwest Pacific Ocean, specifically in the East China Sea and near Korea. O. variabilis inhabits areas of shallow muddy waters, particularly during breeding periods. This species is a member of the Octopodidae family, which consists of the most well-known octopus species.

This species is of economic importance to the coastal areas of China considering its role in stabilizing local fishery communities. In addition to Amphioctopus fangsiao, another key fishery resource to Korea and China, O. variabilis stands as one of the main species of cephalopod communities in East China. In many Asian countries, including South Korea, this small octopus is one of the most popular seafoods considering its low fat content along with its high proportions of polyunsaturated fatty acids. Considering their habits of filter-feeding along with inhabiting tidal flat sediments, these individuals tend to host a variety of microbiota. As a result, they have been noted to cause food-borne illnesses when consumed raw.

== Identification ==
In 1929, Madoka Sasaki noted eighteen species of cephalopods belonging to eleven genera in seven families that occurred in Taiwan. O. variabilis has historically been confused with Octopus minor (Sasaki, 1920), a common benthic species distributed in northeast Asia, due to their morphological similarities. However, the two closely related species differ in their tolerance to environmental conditions and dispersal ability. Due to their similarities and taxonomic confusion, these species are often referred to interchangeably by regional fishermen and earlier scientific literature.

== Distribution and characteristics ==
O. variabilis is one of the most abundant species distributed along the northwest Pacific Ocean, particularly in China, Korea, and Japan. Exhibiting limited dispersal potential, except for occasional movements between upper and lower tidal zones, O. variabilis adults are largely sessile, often times moving along seabeds. As a result of limited dispersal abilities, differentiation amongst O. variabilis populations has resulted, considering weak genetic flow. This species inhabits shallow, muddy environments, and exhibits behaviors of burrowing during breeding periods. Depth ranges of O. variabilis can range between 1-200 meters.

== Life cycle and mating behavior ==
As with other members of class Cephalopod, O. variabilis is gonochoristic. Males exhibit mating behaviors by performing a variety of displays to attract potential mates. During copulation, a male inserts the hectocotylus into the female's mantle cavity, enabling fertilization. Following reproduction, adult males shortly die after spawning, while females die following the brooding period. Juveniles develop directly as they hatch from benthic-attached eggs with no evident planktonic larval stage.

== Consumption ==
O. variabilis is notably one of the most popular seafood choices in countries such as South Korea. Considering its high proportion of polyunsaturated fatty acids, low fat content, and high content of protein, it has been established as a staple seafood in many Asian countries. In South Korean fish markets, O. variabilis is sold to be eaten "raw," as it can be accompanied by a sauce. O. variabilis is a highly versatile seafood item that can be prepared in several ways, including grilling, braising, serving raw, or cooking in stews. However, because it often times consumed raw, the microorganisms within can potentially cause food-borne illnesses. Even though it is considerably rare, extreme cases have even lead to the development of anaphylaxis.

== Future of fishing ==
O. variabilis alongside other species such as AmphiOctopus fangsiao, are economically important species that dominate the northwest Pacific cephalopod communities. These species are fished primarily in East Asian Waters, particularly the Yellow and East China Seas. Since the 1990s, there has been an apparent increasing trend in cephalopod production, which has been accompanied by a change in species composition. Additionally, fluctuations in these compositions have been driven by large-scale environmental variations. Climate projections have indicated that suitable habitat for O. variabilis is likely to extend northward, which poses additional challenges for long-term management.
