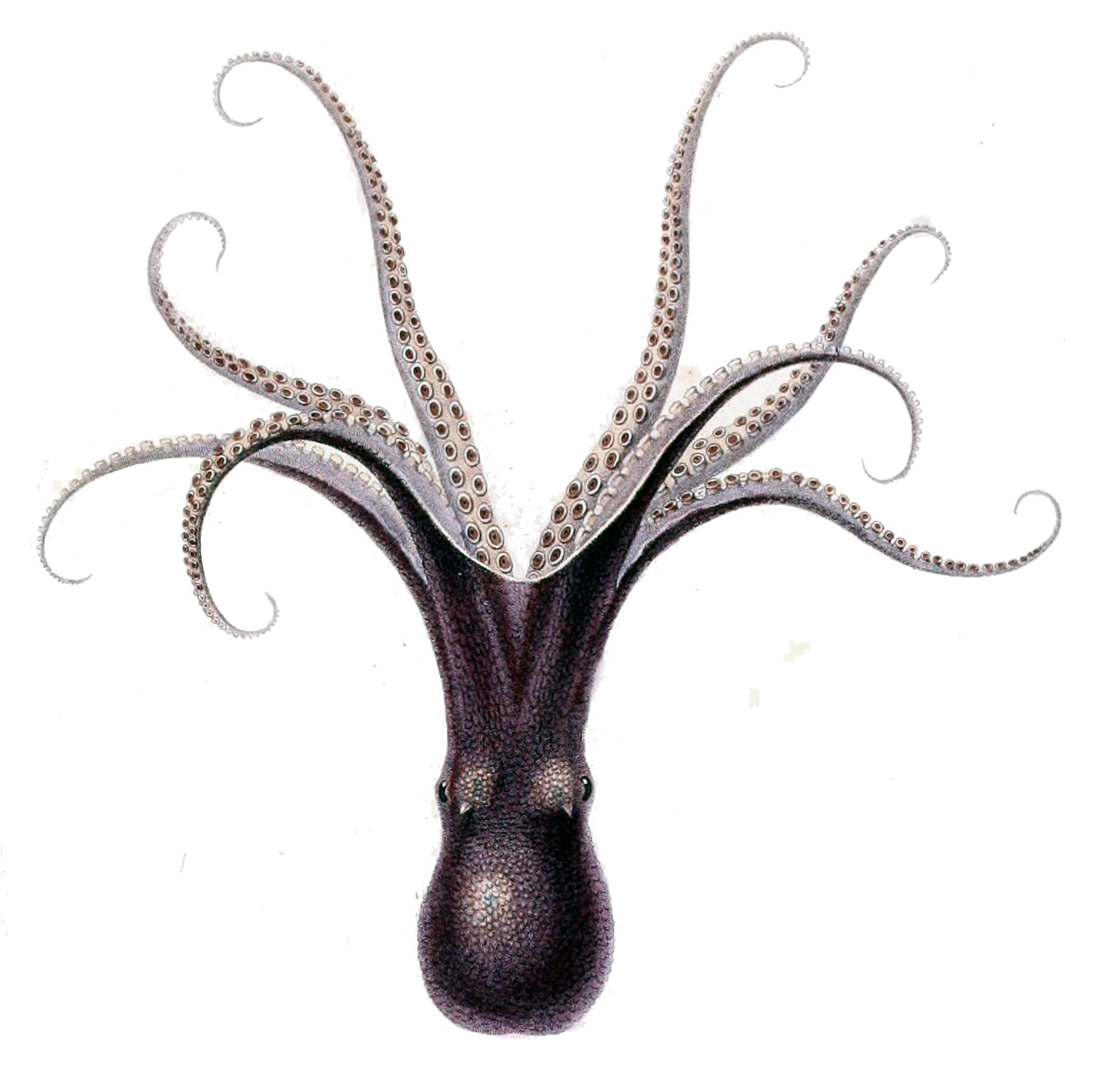
- Robsonella fontaniana

Scientific classification
- Kingdom: Animalia
- Phylum: Mollusca
- Class: Cephalopoda
- Order: Octopoda
- Family: Octopodidae
- Genus: Robsonella; Adam, 1938

Type species
- Octopus fontanianus d'Orbigny, 1834 in 1834-1847

Species
- See text.

Synonyms
- Joubinia Robson, 1929 (invalid as preoccupied by Joubinia Buerger, 1904 Nemertea

= Robsonella =

Genus of molluscs

Robsonella is a small genus of octopuses in the family Octopodidae. It contains two described species. Robsonella octopuses can be found on the central-south coast of Chile. If an octopus’ first lateral tooth in the radula is crescent shaped; this allows you to identify it as a Robsonella fontaniana. One species in the genus, Robsonella fontaniana, inhabit the coastal waters of Chile and range from northern Peru to Golfo Nuevo in Argentina. Robsonella fontaniana are very small (under 50 mm (2.0 in) mantle length), have rugged skin and each eye has a fleshy expansion.

== Species ==
- Robsonella campbelli (E. A. Smith, 1902)
- Robsonella fontaniana (D'Orbigny, 1834 in 1834-1847)
- Robsonella huttoni Benham, 1943
- Robsonella mernoo (O'Shea, 1999)
