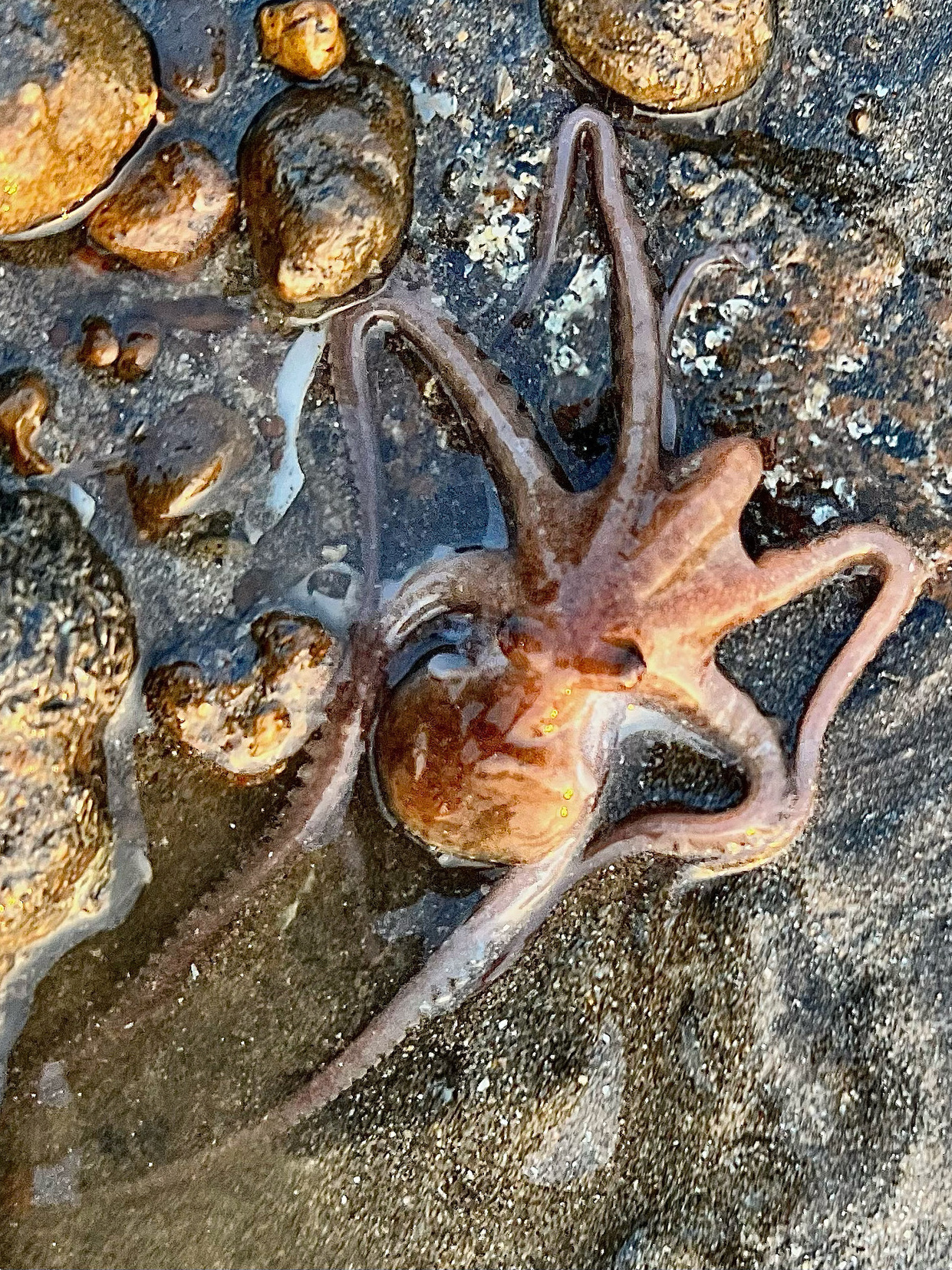
- Cistopus indicus

Scientific classification
- Kingdom: Animalia
- Phylum: Mollusca
- Class: Cephalopoda
- Order: Octopoda
- Family: Octopodidae
- Genus: Cistopus; Gray, 1849

Type species
- Octopus indicus Rapp (in Férussac & d'Orbigny), 1835

= Cistopus =

Genus of octopuses

Cistopus is a genus of octopuses in the family Octopodidae from the Indo-Pacific region, colloquially known as old-lady octopuses. For a long time it was thought that Cistopus was monotypic with the type species, C. indicus, being the only known species. This species was characterised by the possession of eight small mucus filled pouches around the animal's mouth in the web between the bases of each arm, these have an opening which releases the mucus. The function of these pouches is unknown. A new species, C. taiwanicus was described in 2009 from Taiwan. Octopuses in the genus Cistopus are harvested and utilised for food on a commercial basis in southern and eastern Asia. Further new species have been described since then.

== Species ==
The following species are classified in the genus Cistopus:

- Cistopus chinensis Zheng, Lin, Lu & Ma, 2012
- Cistopus indicus (Rapp (in Férussac & d'Orbigny), 1835)
- Cistopus platinoidus Sreeja, Norman & Biju Kumar 2015
- Cistopus taiwanicus Liao & Lu, 2009
