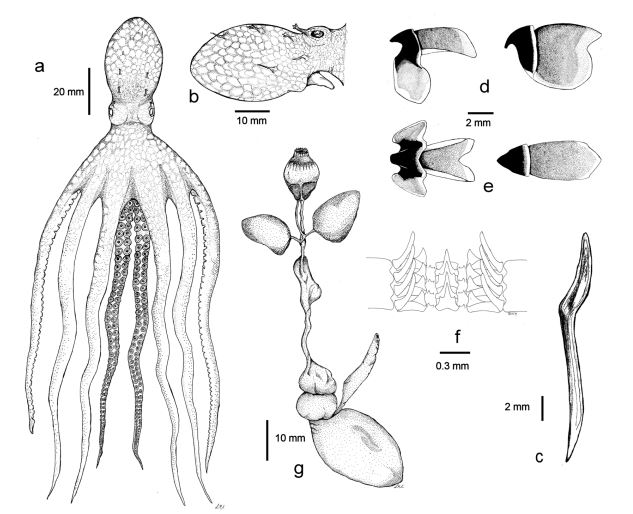

Scientific classification
- Kingdom: Animalia
- Phylum: Mollusca
- Class: Cephalopoda
- Order: Octopoda
- Family: Octopodidae
- Genus: Lepidoctopus; Haimovici and Sales, 2019
- Species: L. joaquini

Binomial name
- Lepidoctopus joaquini Haimovici and Sales, 2019

= Lepidoctopus =

Genus of octopuses

Lepidoctopus joaquini is a little-known species of small octopus in the family Octopodidae. It is the only known species in the monotypic genus Lepidoctopus, and is endemic to the Amazon Reef system of the Atlantic Ocean, where it lives in benthic habitats. It was discovered during surveys that attempted to map the cephalopod diversity of the reef system by analyzing the stomach contents of southern red snappers (Lutjanus purpureus), and is currently only known from specimens found in such stomach contents. Genetic analysis of the specimens has found Lepidoctopus to be a basal member of the Octopodidae that represents a clade distinct from all other genera in the family. It can be physically distinguished from other octopodids by the large overlapping dermal cushions on its body, which give it a distinctly "scaly" appearance.
