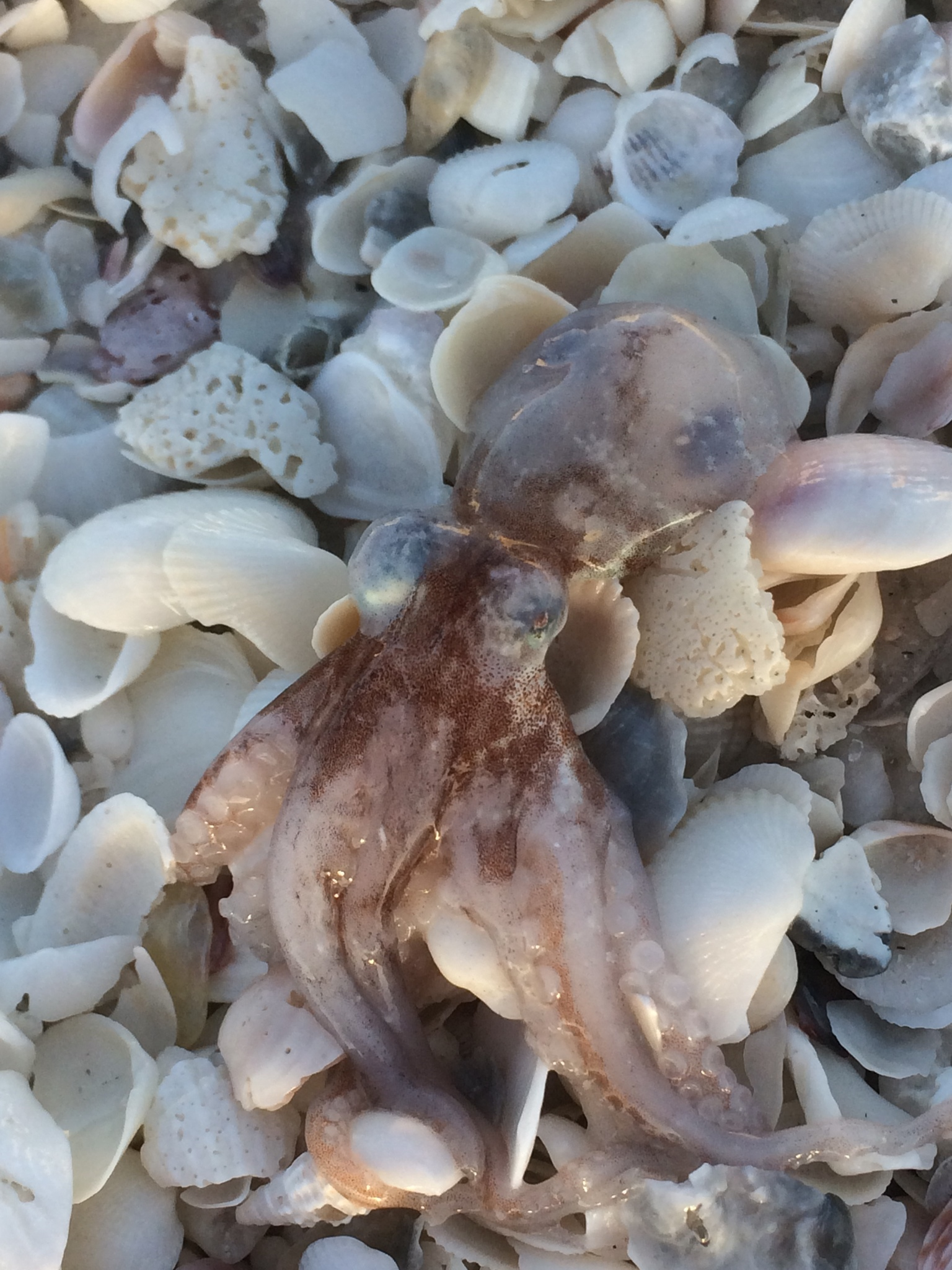

Scientific classification
- Kingdom: Animalia
- Phylum: Mollusca
- Class: Cephalopoda
- Order: Octopoda
- Family: Octopodidae
- Genus: Paroctopus; Naef, 1923

Type species
- Octopus digueti (Perrier and Rochebrune, 1894)

= Paroctopus =

Genus of octopuses

Paroctopus is a small genus of octopuses from the family Octopodidae.

Paroctopus are small-bodied; short mantled, pouch like octopuses with short, stocky arms which are 2 or 3 times the length of the mantle. The males have 1-3 enlarged suckers on each arm with their right third arm being hectocotylised and shorter than its opposite arm. There are stylets and these are non-mineralised. One to 3 enlarged suckers on all arms of males only. The ligula is of medium size with a short calamus. Their gills have 6‑8 lamellae per outer demibranch. Paroctopus lays small to medium-sized eggs which are on very short stalks and are attached singly in small clusters within the empty shells of gastropods and bivalves. They are uniformly coloured with little variation in pattern and they lack a patch and groove system. There is a faint frontal white spot complex. The integument lacks large primary papillae.

The species of Paroctopus are distributed in the northeastern Pacific Ocean off Mexico and the Gulf of California and in the western Atlantic Ocean, the Caribbean Sea and the Gulf of Mexico.

== Species ==
The following species are assigned to Paroctopus:

- Paroctopus araneoides * Taki, 1964
- Paroctopus digueti (Perrier & Rochebrune, 1894)
- Paroctopus mercatoris (Adam, 1937)

The species listed above with an asterisk (*) are taxon inquirendum and need further study to determine if they are valid species or synonyms.
