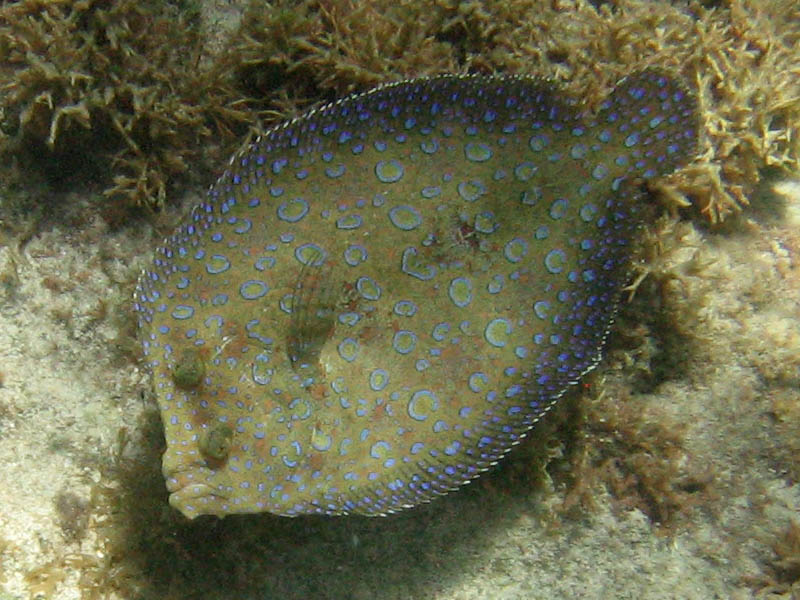

Conservation status
- Least Concern (IUCN 3.1)

Scientific classification
- Kingdom: Animalia
- Phylum: Chordata
- Class: Actinopterygii
- Division: Teleostei
- Order: Carangiformes
- Suborder: Pleuronectoidei
- Family: Bothidae
- Genus: Bothus
- Species: B. lunatus

Binomial name
- Bothus lunatus (Linnaeus, 1758)

Synonyms
- Platophrys lunatus (Linnaeus, 1758); Pleuronectes argus Bloch, 1783; Pleuronectes lunatus Linnaeus, 1758; Rhomboidichthys lunatus (Linnaeus, 1758)

= Plate fish =

Species of fish

The plate fish (Bothus lunatus) is a flounder in the genus Bothus, found in the warmer parts of the Atlantic including the Caribbean. Its typical habitat is sandy plains near coral reefs and it is able to change its colouring to make it well-camouflaged in this environment. It is sometimes known as the peacock flounder, a name also given to the closely related Bothus mancus from the Indo-Pacific.

== Description ==
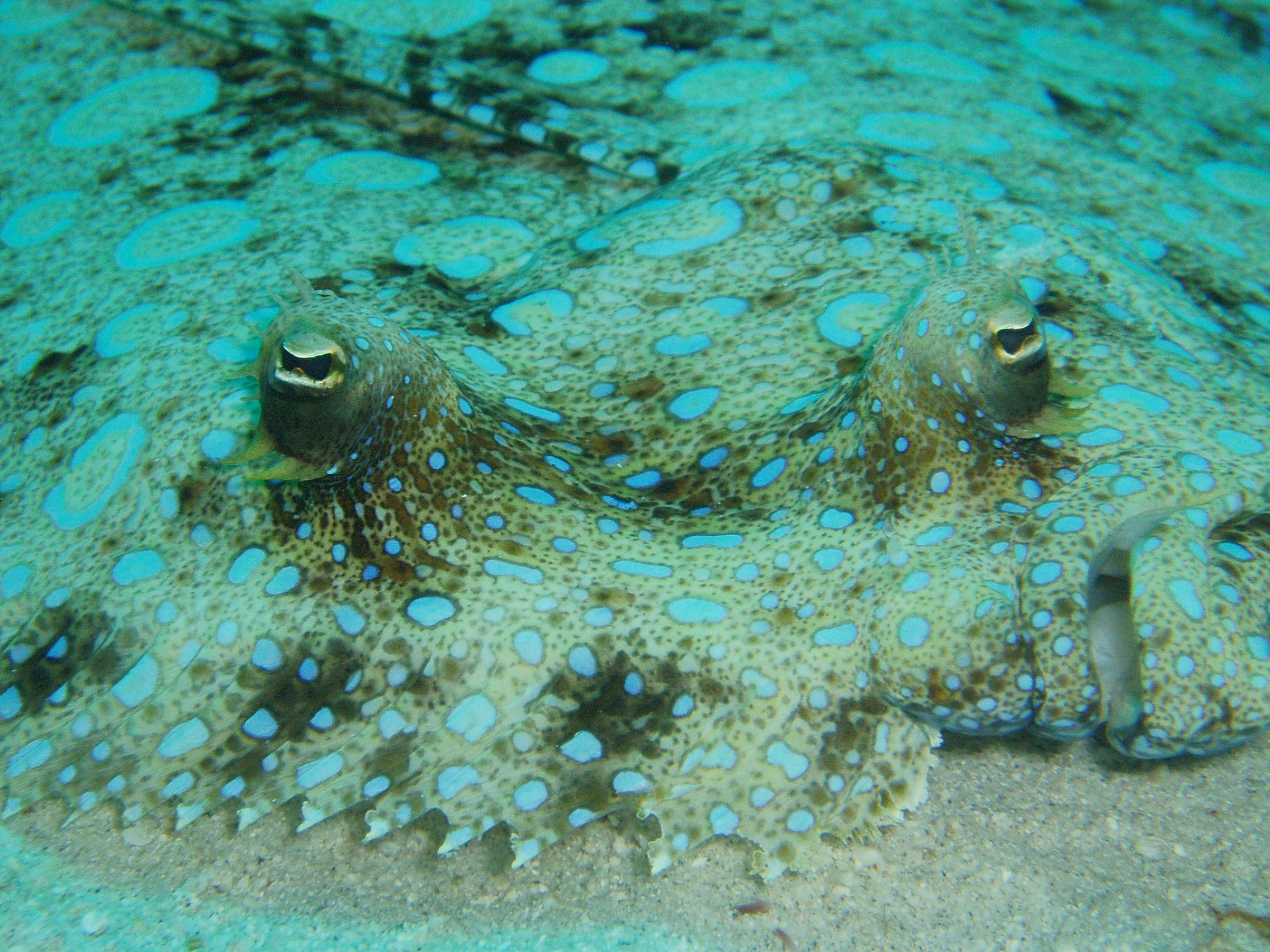
Close-up of head

Bothus lunatus has a laterally flattened body and orientates itself so that its right side is underneath and its left side is uppermost. Both eyes are on this upper surface and project on short thick stalks. The body shape is rounded and the dorsal and anal fins nearly surround the body. The former has 92 to 99 soft rays and the latter 71 to 76. The pectoral fins are long and often erect. An average adult length is about 35 cm (14 in), with a maximum length of 46 cm (18 in). The upper surface of this flounder is some shade between grey, brown and tan with small blue spots and circular blue markings, the head and fins also being spotted and speckled with blue. There are two or three rather diffuse dark patches on the lateral line. The fish can vary its background colour to make it closely resemble that of its surroundings and thus camouflage itself as it lies on the seabed. Fish in this genus are able to change their colouring in two to eight seconds.

== Distribution and habitat ==
Bothus lunatus is found in tropical and subtropical parts of the Atlantic Ocean and the Caribbean Sea. Its range extends from Florida, the Bahamas and Bermuda to Brazil, but it is absent from the Gulf of Mexico. It also occurs in the Gulf of Guinea and Ascension Island. It is usually found between 1 and 20 m (3.3 and 65.6 ft) deep but may occur as deep as 100 m (328 ft). Its typical habitat is sandy areas near coral reefs, in seagrass meadows or near mangroves. It is also sometimes found over rubble or hard substrates and is one of the most common flounders near coral reefs.

== Behaviour ==
Bothus lunatus is well-camouflaged as it lies on the sandy seabed, often partially submerged in the sediment. It is more visible when it swims, which it does in a series of short glides, remaining close to the rippled sand contours of the ocean floor. In the Caribbean, a small octopus, Macrotritopus defilippi, mimics these bursts of swimming activity, a behaviour which might afford it protection from predators large enough to take a bite out of a soft-bodied octopus but too small to tackle a rigid flounder.

In the West Indies, Bothus lunatus largely feeds on fishes, which make up 85.7% of its diet by volume, and particularly on herrings in the genus Jenkinsia and the bigeye scad (Selar crumenophthalmus). Another 11.4% of its diet consists of mantis shrimps and 2.9% of octopuses. Bothus lunatus is believed to be an ambush predator, lying concealed on the seabed before darting out to catch any unwary prey that moves too close.
