= Digitosepia robsoni =

Conservation status
- Data Deficient (IUCN 3.1)

Scientific classification
- Kingdom: Animalia
- Phylum: Mollusca
- Class: Cephalopoda
- Order: Sepiida
- Family: Sepiidae
- Genus: Digitosepia
- Species: D. robsoni

Binomial name
- Digitosepia robsoni (Massy, 1927)

Synonyms
- Rhombosepion robsoni Massy, 1927

Species of cuttlefish

Digitosepia robsoni is a species of cuttlefish known only from its type locality, Hout Bay in South Africa. It lives at depths of between 17 and 37 m.

Digitosepia robsoni grows to a mantle length of 20 mm.

The type specimen was collected in Hout Bay, South Africa and is deposited at the Natural History Museum in London. The specific name honours the painter and curator of Zoology at the British Museum, Natural History, Guy Coburn Robson (1888-1945), and the species was named by the Irish naturalist Annie Massy (1868-1931).
