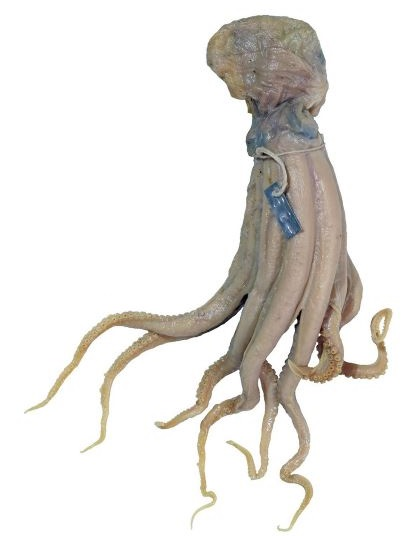
- Teretoctopus alcocki specimen (OUMNH ZC.1979)

Scientific classification
- Kingdom: Animalia
- Phylum: Mollusca
- Class: Cephalopoda
- Order: Octopoda
- Family: Enteroctopodidae
- Genus: Teretoctopus; Robson, 1929

Type species
- Teretoctopus indica Robson, 1929

Species
- See text.

= Teretoctopus =

Genus of molluscs

Teretoctopus is a genus of octopuses in the family Enteroctopodidae.

The genus is known presently from two species found in the northern Indian Ocean, both species (and the genus being described by Guy Coburn Robson):

- Teretoctopus alcocki Robson, 1932
- Teretoctopus indicus Robson, 1929

== Description ==
The genus has historically been poorly known and hard to distinguish from other genera, and was assumed to be placed in the family Octopodidae. In addition type material for both species was assumed to be lost. Recently, the genus has been re-assessed and some important type material rediscovered, enabling re-description and allocation of the genus to Enteroctopodidae.

The genus is diagnosed by having smooth skin (without ridges or papillae), suckers in two rows along the arms, lacking an ink sac, having the 'funnel organ' reduced to four separate pads ('quadripartite' configuration), having a crop with/without a diverticulum, having a radula with lateral cusps on the rachidian (central teeth), and having small posterior salivary glands.

The genus is overall rather comparable to Muusoctopus and Vulcanoctopus, particularly given the lack of ink sac, but the quadripartite funnel organ seems distinctive.
