= Teretoctopus indicus =

Conservation status
- Data Deficient (IUCN 3.1)

Scientific classification
- Domain: Eukaryota
- Kingdom: Animalia
- Phylum: Mollusca
- Class: Cephalopoda
- Order: Octopoda
- Family: Octopodidae
- Genus: Teretoctopus
- Species: T. indicus

Binomial name
- Teretoctopus indicus G. C. Robson, 1929

Species of octopus

Teretoctopus indicus is a species of octopus within the family Octopodidae. Its believed to live in the Western Indian Ocean, although the species is only known from its type locality from the Arabian Sea at a depth of 1000 meters. It has been classified as 'Data deficient' by the IUCN Red List, as there is little to no knowledge of this species.
