= Grimpella =

Conservation status
- Data Deficient (IUCN 3.1)

Scientific classification
- Kingdom: Animalia
- Phylum: Mollusca
- Class: Cephalopoda
- Order: Octopoda
- Family: Octopodidae
- Genus: Grimpella; Robson, 1928
- Species: G. thaumastocheir

Binomial name
- Grimpella thaumastocheir Robson, 1928

Genus of octopuses

Grimpella thaumastocheir, the velvet octopus, is the only species in the monotypic genus Grimpella, in the family Octopodidae. This species has a typical body length of 200 mm. It is found in offshore waters and is endemic to the seas off southeastern and southwestern Australia.
