= Euaxoctopus =

Scientific classification
- Kingdom: Animalia
- Phylum: Mollusca
- Class: Cephalopoda
- Order: Octopoda
- Family: Octopodidae
- Genus: Euaxoctopus; Voss, 1971

Type species
- Euaxoctopus panamensis Voss, 1971

Species
- See text.

Genus of molluscs

Euaxoctopus is a genus of octopuses in the family Octopodidae.

== Species ==
- Euaxoctopus panamensis Voss, 1971
- Euaxoctopus pillsburyae Voss, 1975 – Map Octopus
- Euaxoctopus scalenus * (Hoyle, 1904)

The species listed above with an asterisk (*) are questionable and need further study to determine if they are valid species or synonyms.
