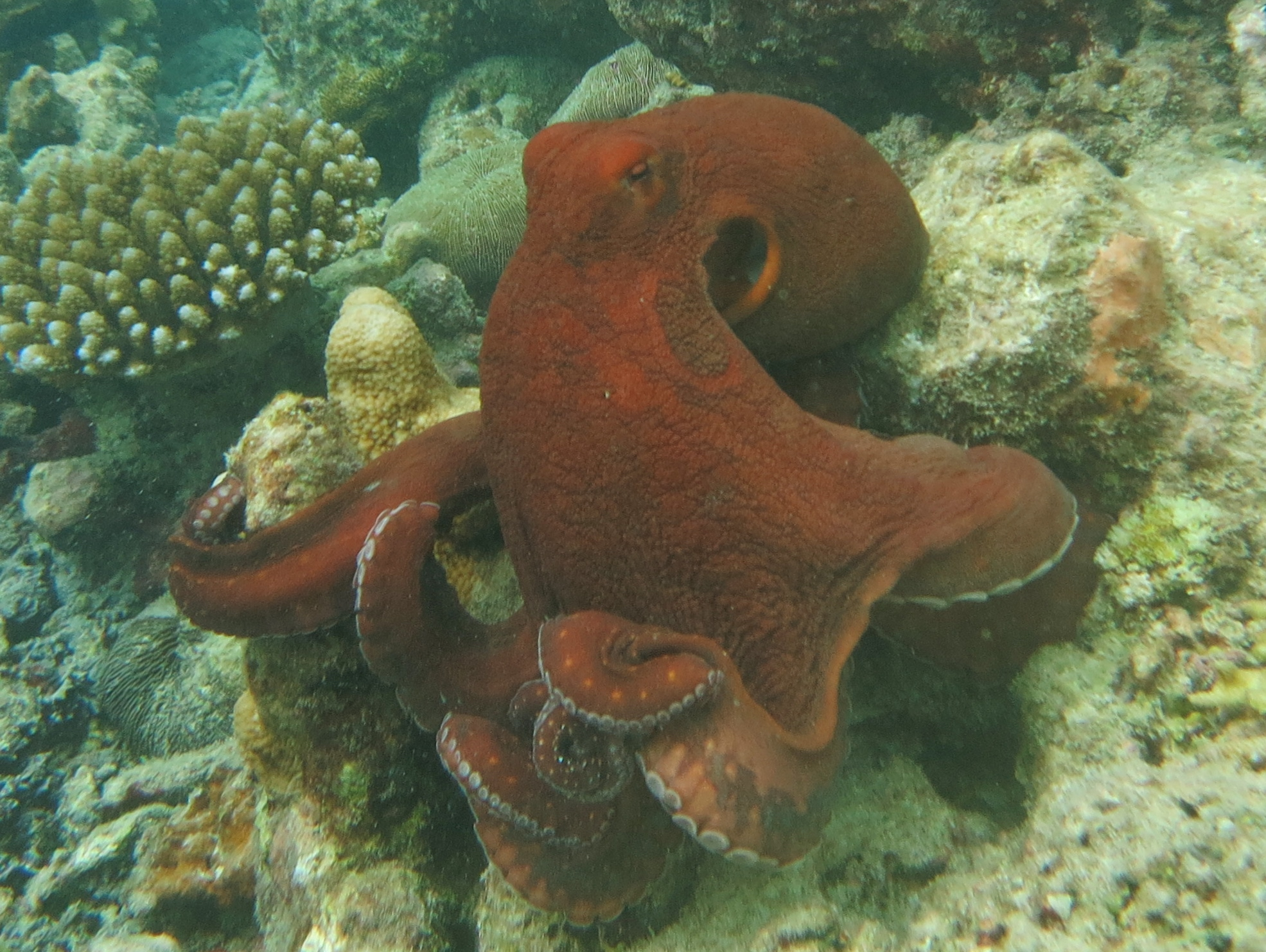

Conservation status
- Least Concern (IUCN 3.1)

Scientific classification
- Kingdom: Animalia
- Phylum: Mollusca
- Class: Cephalopoda
- Order: Octopoda
- Family: Octopodidae
- Genus: Octopus
- Species: O. cyanea

Binomial name
- Octopus cyanea Gray, 1849

Synonyms
- Callistoctopus magnocellatus Taki, 1964; Octopus cyaneus Gray, 1849; Octopus cyanea var. gracilis Robson, 1929; Octopus glaber Wülker, 1920; Octopus herdmani Hoyle, 1904; Octopus horsti Joubin, 1898; Octopus marmoratus Hoyle, 1885; Sepia barffi Curtiss, 1938

= Octopus cyanea =

Big blue octopus

Species of cephalopod known as the big blue octopus

Octopus cyanea, also known as the big blue octopus or day octopus, is an octopus in the family Octopodidae. It occurs in both the Pacific and Indian Oceans, from Hawaii to the eastern coast of Africa. O. cyanea grows to 16 cm in mantle length with arms to at least 80 cm. This octopus was described initially by the British zoologist John Edward Gray in 1849; the type specimen was collected off Australia and is at the Natural History Museum in London.

== Description ==
Living as it does on coral reefs, and hunting by day, O. cyanea is adept at camouflage and not only can change colour frequently, but also can change the patterns on and texture of its skin. One researcher observed it change its appearance 1000 times in seven hours. As it moves across the seabed it makes changes in its colouring and appearance to match the substrate beneath. The colour changes are instantaneous and made by chromatophores under direct control of the brain. This octopus sometimes produces a "passing clouds" display when stationary near prey such as a crab; this mimics a dark shadow passing across its surface and may encourage the crab to move incautiously.

== Distribution ==
O. cyanea is found on reefs and in shallow waters in the Indo-Pacific. Its range extends from the Red Sea, the East African coast, and Madagascar, to southeastern Asia, Oceania, and as far as Hawaii.

== Ecology ==
While most species of octopus are nocturnal, O. cyanea is diurnal, although mostly crepuscular, being active at dawn and dusk. It maintains a den to which it returns after foraging; a rock crevice, a hidden place under an overhang, a hiding place among coral heads, or a hole excavated in rubble or sand.

It is a predator and searches the reef for fish, crabs, shrimp, and molluscs. Small items may be eaten where they are caught, while larger items are carried back to the den for consumption. Crabs may be killed by a bite and given an injection of toxic saliva, then chewed up in the beak of the octopus, while molluscs may have their shells drilled and the animal inside being predigested to ease extraction. Empty mollusc shells and crab carapaces are discarded outside the den, forming a midden.

They sometimes engage in cooperative hunting with the roving coral grouper. Day octopuses have also been observed participating in group hunts with blacktip grouper and goatfish in the Red Sea. During these hunts, individuals have been seen to punch and strike groupers with their arms, theorised to be a 'discipline' response towards fish exploiting the hunt rather than actively participating, and as a means to prevent fish from crowding around the octopus. As some occurrences of punching occurred outside of these situations, day octopuses are also speculated to engage in this behaviour out of spite, as a response to normally-cooperative partners stealing prey from the octopus or other fish in the group.

O. cyanea has a lifespan of 12–15 months after settling from the planktonic larval state. During this time, it grows from about 67 to 6,500 g (0.1 to 14.3 lb). Its growth curve is nearly exponential and it converts its prey into new growth with an efficiency greater than 50%, relying on protein for growth, energy production, and energy reserves.

In captivity, it breeds at any time of year, probably depending on when the female reaches maturity. Mating may become cannibalistic. However Octopus cyanea will socially tolerate other individuals by sharing tanks and dens and with typically no loss to cannibalism or escape. They also exhibit significant levels of social repulsion, and individuals often chose a solitary den when given the option. The male may mate with several different females, but after this, the suckers on the edge of his webbing expand in size. During the next two to three months, they continue enlarging while the octopus goes into a decline and dies. Meanwhile, the female remains beside her eggs that are deposited in a den, and dies soon after they hatch.

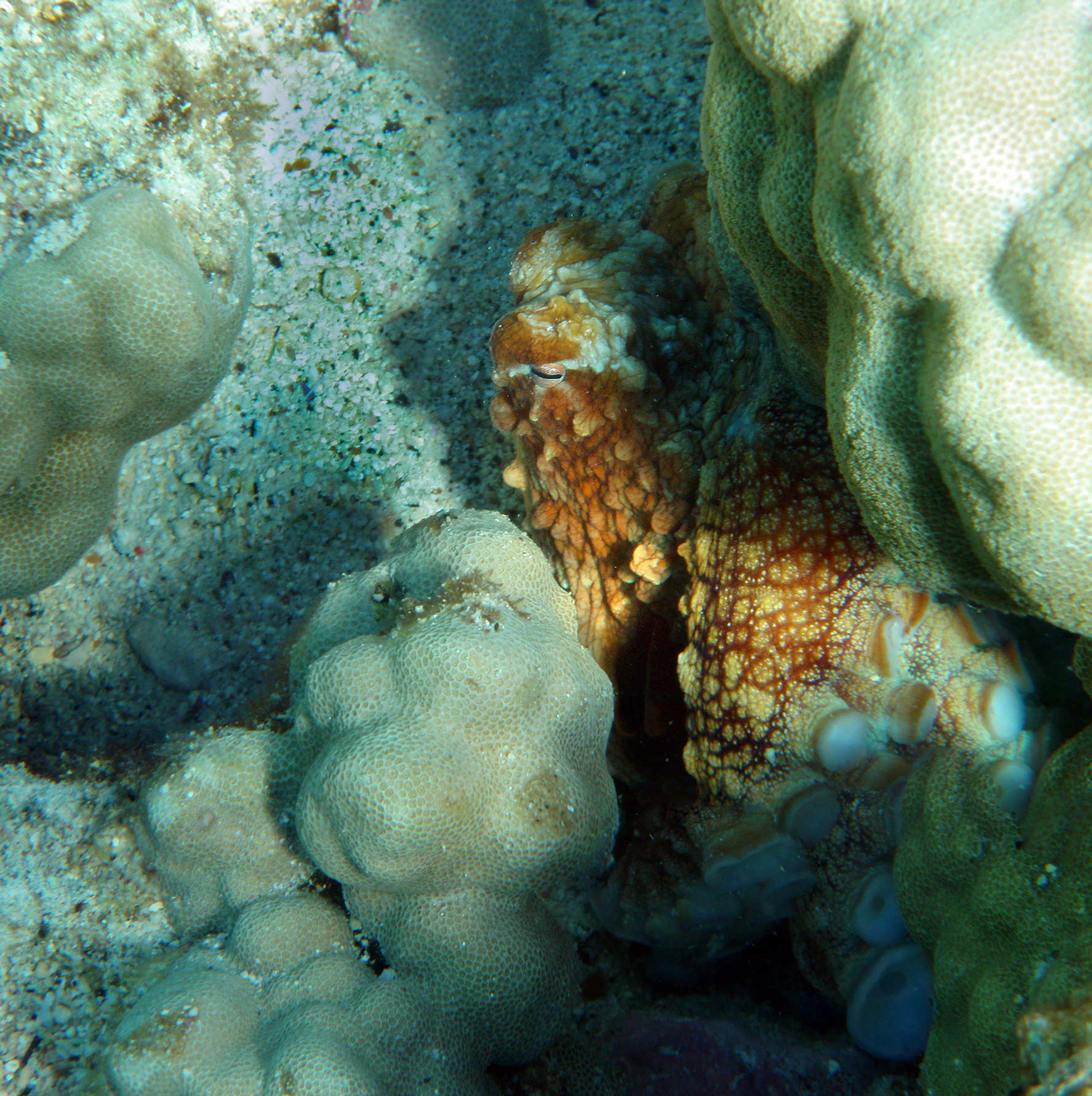

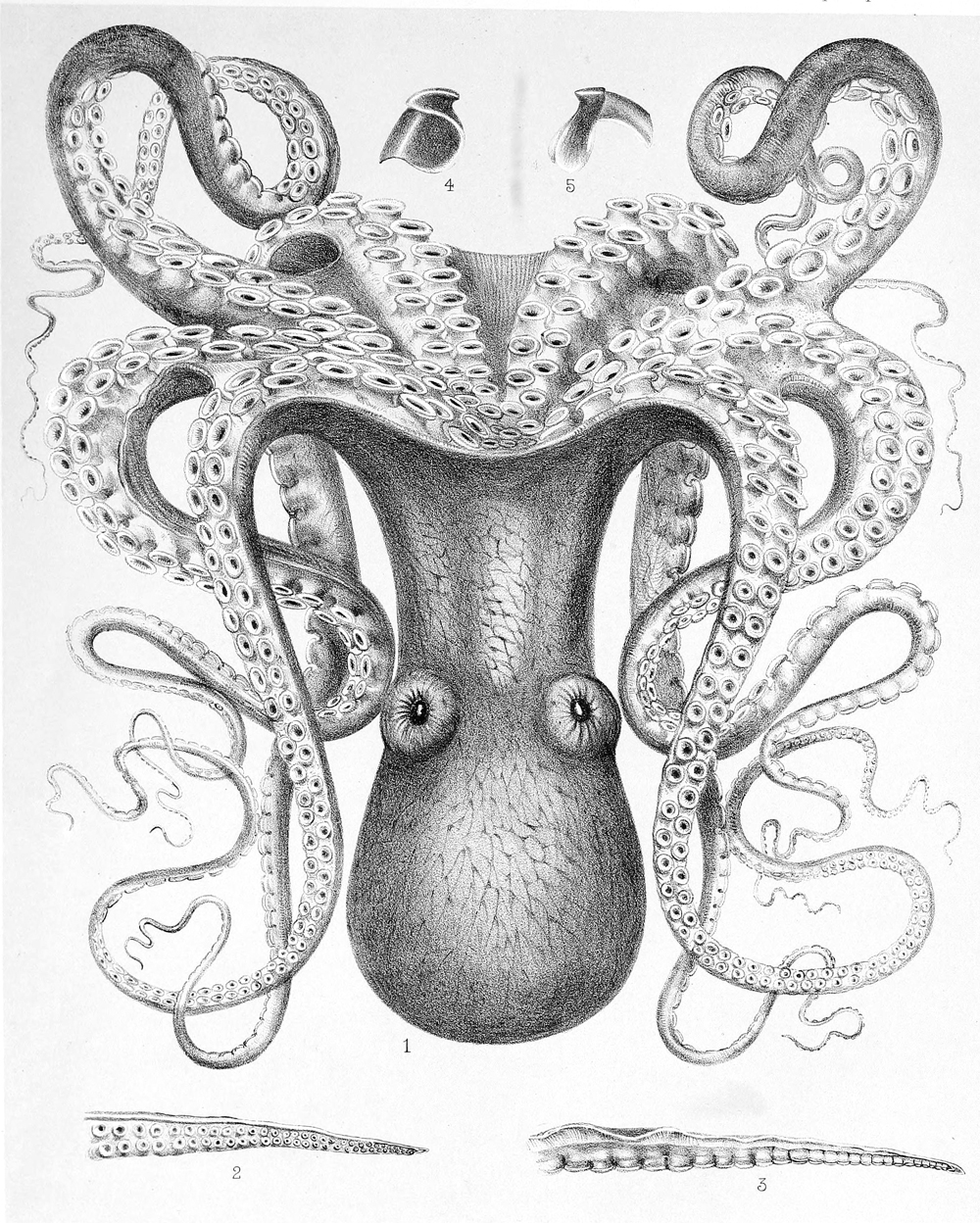

== Ethnozoology ==
Hawaii

In the Hawaiian language, the octopus is called generically as heʻe', or heʻe mauli to distinguish it from the night octopus (heʻe pūloa) species. (Note: Also, the octopus is commonly called "squid" by local residents of Hawaii.) Of these, only the day octopus was typically eaten by the natives. (Note: That is to say, the tough-textured and bitter-tasting night octopus (O. ornatus) rarely eaten except for medicinal purpose.) A traditional method of capture made use of a cowrie shell lure to attract the octopuses.
