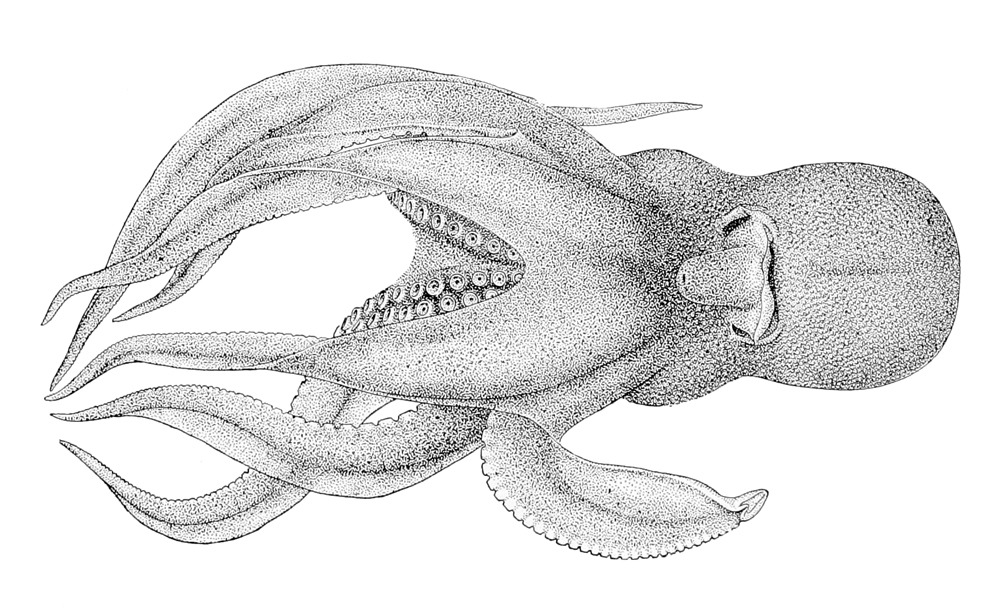
- Pteroctopus hoylei

Scientific classification
- Kingdom: Animalia
- Phylum: Mollusca
- Class: Cephalopoda
- Order: Octopoda
- Family: Octopodidae
- Genus: Pteroctopus; Fischer, 1882 in 1880-1887

Type species
- Octopus tetracirrhus Delle Chiaje, 1830

Species
- See text.

Synonyms
- Berrya Adam, 1939; Danoctopus Joubin, 1933; Hapaloctopus Taki, 1962

= Pteroctopus =

Genus of molluscs

Pteroctopus is a genus of octopuses in the family Octopodidae.

== Species ==
- Pteroctopus eurycephala * (Taki, 1964)
- Pteroctopus hoylei (Berry, 1909) – Pacific Fourhorn Octopus
- Pteroctopus keralensis * (Oommen, 1966)
- Pteroctopus schmidti (Joubin, 1933) – Dana Octopus
- Pteroctopus tetracirrhus (Delle Chiaje, 1830 in 1823-1831) – Fourhorn Octopus or Atlantic Fourhorn Octopus
- Pteroctopus witjazi * Akimushkin, 1963

The species listed above with an asterisk (*) are taxon inquirendum and need further study to determine if they are valid species or synonyms.
