= Galeoctopus =

Conservation status
- Least Concern (IUCN 3.1)

Scientific classification
- Kingdom: Animalia
- Phylum: Mollusca
- Class: Cephalopoda
- Order: Octopoda
- Family: Octopodidae
- Genus: Galeoctopus; Norman, Boucher & Hochberg, 2004
- Species: G. lateralis

Binomial name
- Galeoctopus lateralis Norman, Boucher & Hochberg, 2004

Genus of octopuses

Galeoctopus lateralis, the sharkclub octopus, is a species of octopus, from the family Octopodidae. This species was described in 2004 from specimens collected at depths of 200–400 m in the southern and western Pacific Ocean. It is a small octopus in which the mature males have a distinctive ligula which superficially resembles a shark's jaw and head including teeth‐like lugs. Other distinguishing characteristics include a lateral mantle ridge, a skin sculpture which includes star-shaped papillae, and the females have oviducts with hare distally swollen.
