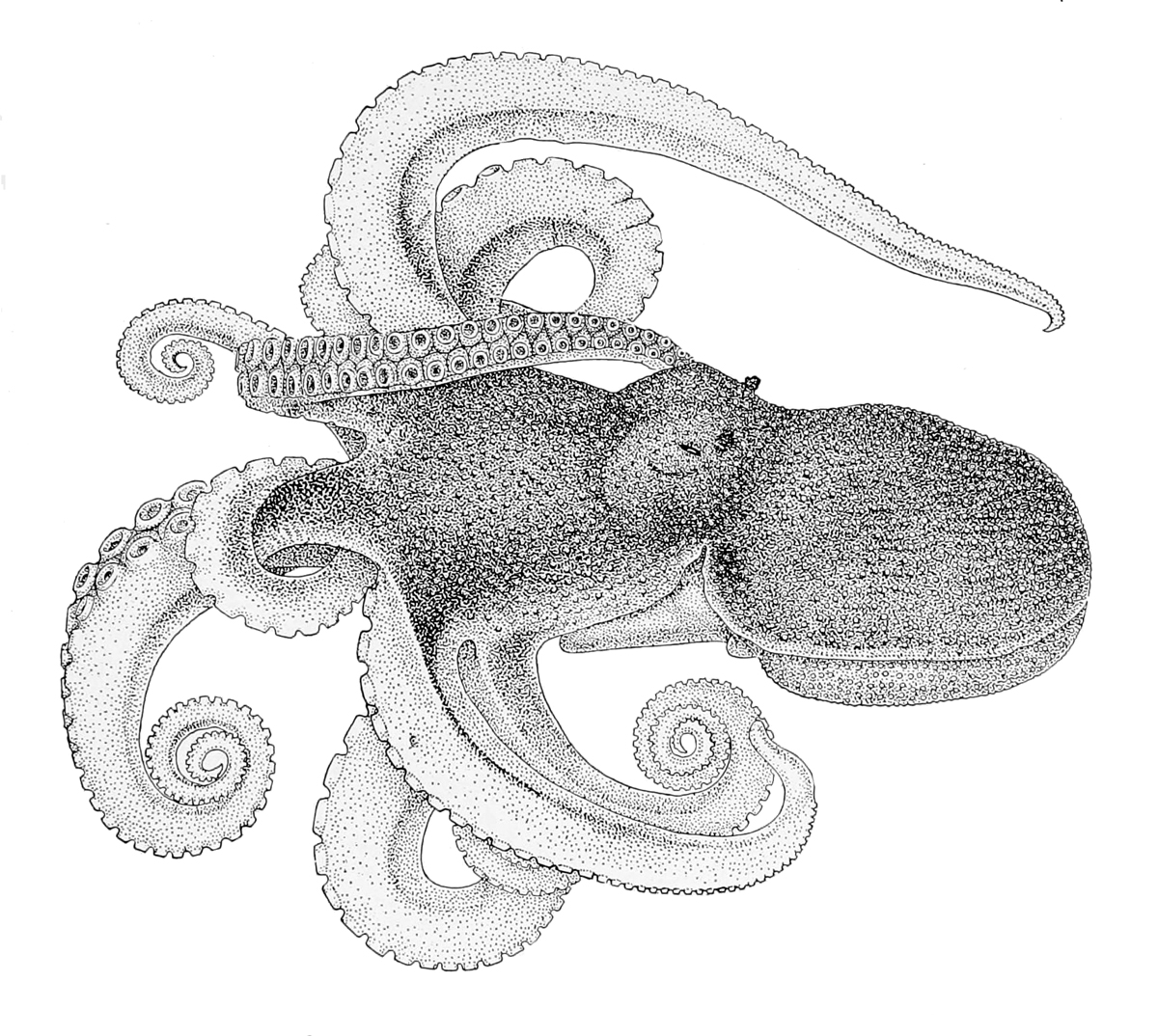
- Scaeurgus patagiatus

Scientific classification
- Kingdom: Animalia
- Phylum: Mollusca
- Class: Cephalopoda
- Order: Octopoda
- Family: Octopodidae
- Genus: Scaeurgus; Troschel, 1857

Type species
- Octopus unicirrhus Delle Chiaje [in Férussac & d'Orbigny, 1841

Species
- See text.

= Scaeurgus =

Genus of molluscs

Scaeurgus is a genus of octopuses in the family Octopodidae. The species of this genus are characterized by inhabiting the upper bathyal benthic zone from temperate and tropical latitudes in all major oceans.

== Species ==
- Scaeurgus jumeau Norman, Hochberg & Boucher-Rodoni, 2005
- Scaeurgus nesisi Norman, Hochberg & Boucher-Rodoni, 2005
- Scaeurgus patagiatus Berry, 1913
- Scaeurgus tuber Norman, Hochberg & Boucher-Rodoni, 2005
- Scaeurgus unicirrhus (Delle Chiaje, 1839-41 in Férussac and D'Orbigny, 1834–1848) - Atlantic Warty Octopus or Unihorn Octopus
