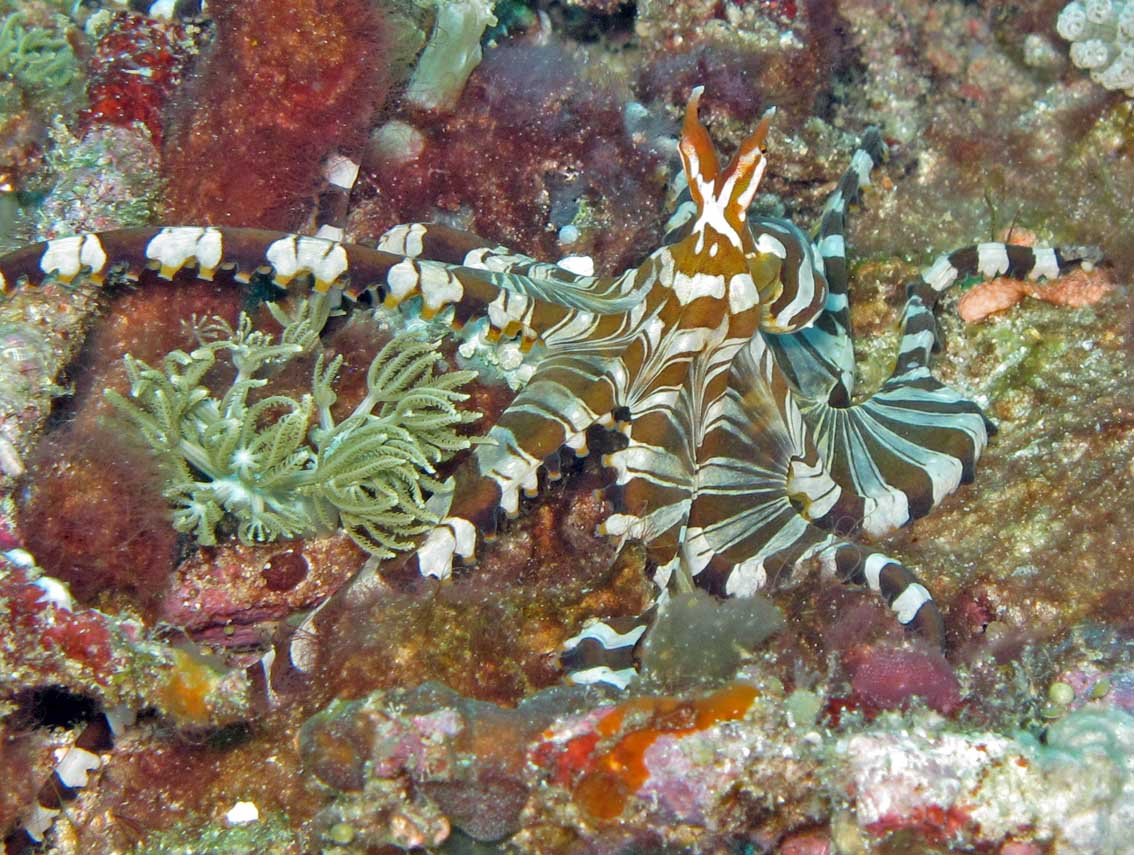
- Individual at Komodo N. P., Indonesia

Conservation status
- Least Concern (IUCN 3.1)

Scientific classification
- Kingdom: Animalia
- Phylum: Mollusca
- Class: Cephalopoda
- Order: Octopoda
- Family: Octopodidae
- Genus: Wunderpus; Hochberg, Norman & Finn, 2006
- Species: W. photogenicus

Binomial name
- Wunderpus photogenicus Hochberg, Norman & Finn, 2006

= Wunderpus =

Species of cephalopod

Wunderpus photogenicus, the wunderpus octopus, is a small-bodied species of octopus with distinct white and rusty brown coloration. 'Wunderpus' from German "wunder" meaning 'marvel' or 'wonder'.

Due to the appearance and behavior of the wunderpus, it is frequently confused with its close relative, the mimic octopus. The wunderpus octopus was not discovered until the 1980s and was only officially described in detail in 2006. The wunderpus octopus is important commercially to the underwater photography, dive and tourism communities, especially throughout Indonesia. The wunderpus is also valued as an expensive ornamental marine species for the home aquarium.

== Appearance ==
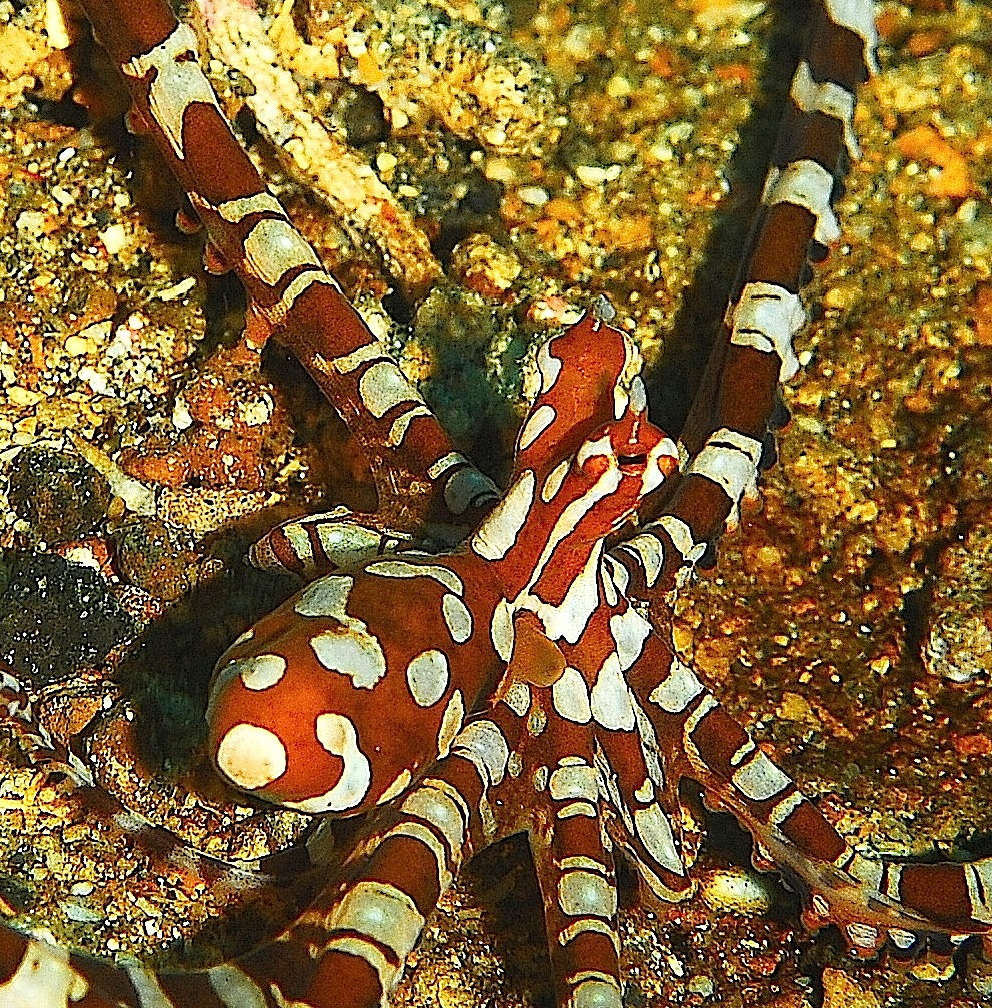
Close up of W. photogenicus, showing its distinctive color patterns

An adult wunderpus octopus displays an individually unique pattern of white spots and bands over a rusty brown background. Even though each body pattern is unique to the individual, generally all wunderpus octopuses display a circular pattern of about six white spots at the posterior lip of its mantle, head and neck area. Some of these spots are fused.

As the wunderpus ages, their body patterns become more complex. Each body is consistently covered in a brownish-red coloration, both dorsally and ventrally, with white lateral bands and markings along their arms, mantle, head and eye stalks. Underneath, their suckers are a yellowish-cream color. The wunderpus has relatively smooth skin with papillae throughout body.

The wunderpus is also known for its ability to mimic other sea animals. The wunderpus can change its color patterns when disturbed or threatened. This quick-change artist is able to change its appearance, both color and shape, in a quick draw in order to get out of harm's way. The change of its color patterns allows the wunderpus to either blend in with its surroundings or mimic a venomous species to scare its threat away. The ability to change patterns and impersonate other species has evolved to ensure the survival of the wunderpus.

=== Photo identification ===
Cephalopods are difficult to track over time and distance due to many factors. Researchers usually use naturally occurring injuries and/or scars to identify individuals but this technique does not work for long term identification, as an octopus is able to regenerate limbs and heal in a relatively short amount of time. Researchers can also use external tags to help track individuals but octopuses are able to remove external tags from their body making them tough to track. Other tracking and identification methods include tattooing, but that puts the organism at risk, so photo-identification is the best way to track this species.

Due to the naturally occurring body color and patterns that the wunderpus exhibits, these color markings are often used as a method to identifying individuals. Photo identification allows for individuals or populations of a species to be identified and tracked without physically handling them. In order for photo-identification to work, the body color and pattern must vary across individuals but remain constant over time. Each individual of the wunderpus exhibits unique white markings over a reddish-brown background, making photo identification the perfect method to track them over time. Being able to track an individual or population of a specific species like the wunderpus octopus helps scientists study aspects like intraspecific behavioral interaction, survivorship, migration patterns and population estimates. Such observations and data sets facilitate our understanding of this under-documented species.

=== Chromatophores ===
Chromatophores, in the case of cephalopods, are neuromuscular organs that contain pigment and function differently than in most other animals. The chromatophores react to stimuli and facilitate interaction with their environment. Each organ contains an elastic sac containing pigment which is attached to the radial muscle of the octopus. When the octopus becomes aroused, the radial muscles contract which expands the chromatophores. In contrast, when the octopus is in a relaxed state, the chromatophores will retract into the elastic sac.

As these chromatophores interact with their environment, it enables the octopus to select, at any time, a particular body pattern. This enables it for instance to camouflage itself and hide from their predators. Another function of their chromatophores is intraspecific communication which facilitates their signalling to one another.

Juvenile and para-larvae octopuses also have chromatophores called founder chromatophores, which are also sac-like organs that contain pigments in their skin. The founder chromatophores are prominent in juveniles and become more masked as the octopus approaches adulthood. The founder chromatophores are found along the ventral mantle and funnel of the para-larvae and it makes it easy to identify cephalopod para-larvae due to is distinct patterns. The founder chromatophores produce unique patterns in hatchlings and make them easy to identify.

== Anatomy ==
The wunderpus has small eyes on top of elongated stalks protruding from its mantle. Over each eye is a conical papilla. The thin-walled mantle of the wunderpus has weak musculature and wide aperture. The head has a distinct neck area and is Y-shaped with the eye on each branch of the 'Y'. The head of a male wunderpus is wider than its mantle and for female wunderpus, their mantle is wider than their head. For females, this is due to the large ovary in their mantle. They have gill with 6-7 lamellae per demibranch present.

The wunderpus has a relatively small body and a flexible hydrostatic skeleton. Their funnel organ is generally W-shaped and adjacent to the short-lateral arms. The dorsal arms of the wunderpus are the shortest, while the ventral or lateral arms are the longest. For males, the third right arm is hectocotylized and lack functional tips. The arms are an important appendage because the octopus relies on it for aggression, display, locomotion and prey capture. Each arm is typically thin, elastic and triangular in cross-section. The width of each arm increases as you move down away from the mouth, towards a quarter of the arm length. Webs develop of the ventro-lateral edge of the arms and are present the entire length of the arms. This is what allows them to make a "net" out of their arms to capture prey. Their webs, like their arms, are also thin and elastic. Their suckers on their arms are smaller and more spaced than most cephalopods and they lack enlarged suckers in both sexes.

Inside the wunderpus is a short, robust intestine. Due to the short nature of the intestine, it is relatively wide. The wunderpus has a crop with a distinct diverticulum and elongated anal flaps. The wunderpus lack an interbranchial water pore system. They have a stylet located above the heart, that is short and made of chitin. In the mouth parts of the octopus there are posterior salivary glands. The beak has a small upper hood and a rounded lower hood. The rostrum is bluntly hooked and there are seven teeth and two marginal plates with the radula for chewing.

== Distribution ==
The wunderpus is found in shallow waters from Bali and Sulawesi north to the Philippines and east to Vanuatu. A popular spot for the wunderpus, documented by dive photographers, is in the volcanic sand plain near the Lembeh Strait. These soft-bodied octopuses are benthic creatures, living along the bottom sediments in relatively shallow waters (no deeper than 20 m or 66 ft). The wunderpus prefers a habitat with soft sediment substrates that allows them to burrow under the substrate or other organisms to seek shelter. Populations of the wunderpus can vary and be as dense as up to 5 individuals per 25 m^{2} (270 ft^{2}) or as little as not even being able to be spotted.

== Life history ==
Little is actually known and documented about the behavior and life history of the wunderpus and this could partially be due to their life style choice of solitude. There is little to no social behavior exhibited in the wunderpus octopus. Of the few specific postures and behavioral patterns that have been observed of the wunderpus, it is believed that they are impersonators of other animals. There are studies that suggest that the wunderpus is known to impersonate animals like the lionfish and the banded sea krait. The banded white markings of the wunderpus, allow it to be able to mimic the stripes and spines of the lionfish. It has also been documented that the wunderpus will burrow six of their arms, leaving two free to mimic the appearance of the banded sea krait. Both organisms the wunderpus has been documented impersonating are venomous, suggesting that the wunderpus does this behavior to ward off potential predators.

=== Reproduction ===
In male wunderpus, their reproductive organ (penis) is relatively short but strong. They have a spermatophore storage sac located sub-terminally in the mantle, that takes up about 50% of the mantle's length. This storage sac is broad and translucent allowing the spermatophores to be seen through the thin sac wall. The spermatophores are 'unarmed' and are usually in counts of 25–30 in these translucent storage sacs.

The female wunderpus has a large sub-terminal ovary with 4 follicular folds. The female will produce around 2,000 mature small, stalked eggs within a single female brood. The female will carry her eggs in her arms and they typically die shortly after their offspring hatch. Wunderpus hatchlings become water column swimmers and move around with their tiny finger-like arms rather than benthic organisms.

Mating in the wunderpus involves the male mounting the female to insert its short hectocotylized arm into the mantle of the female. Typically in different octopus species in the mating ritual, the males hectocotylized arm is longer which allows more distance between the male and female.

== Feeding ==
The wunderpus feed from dusk to dawn on small crustaceans and fishes. They have two prime feeding strategies. The first method is the "probing" method, where the wunderpus will extend their arms to crevices and holes to look for prey. When prey is encountered, they use their arms and suckers to hold onto the prey and remove it from its burrow. The second method of feeding requires them to flare their arms and webs over coral and sand to trap their prey and this method is called "web-casting". When the wunderpus does this, it almost looks like an opened umbrella.

While feeding, the wunderpus will retract back into its shelter to feed so they are not exposed to predators while feeding. The wunderpus is a favorite in the home aquarium trade and in captivity, where they display a different feeding behavior. In the wild, they typically feed in the low light of the dusk, but in captivity they have been observed feeding during the day.

=== Predation ===
The wunderpus is known to display an interspecific aggressive foraging behavior. Using its right dorsolateral arm or its dorsal and dorsolateral arms, the wunderpus forms a loop around the mantle opening of the other octopus. Studies have found that the wunderpus exhibit this aggressive behavior on its close relative the mimic octopus (Thaumoctopus mimicus). Using its longest arm to form the loop around its opponent, its begins to tighten the loop, constricting it like a snake would constrict its prey. This aggressive display of asphyxiation does not immediately choke its opponent but instead prevents the flow of water into the mantle and out of the funnel. This flow of water is important because it carries water over the gill to oxygenate their blood. Without this replenishment, the octopus will gradually deplete its oxygen and ultimately die. This constriction over the mantle also prevents their opponent from releasing its ink.

Cephalopods are constantly at risk of predation due to their soft bodies, which provide no protection against elements and predators like fish. Most cephalopods are equipped with the ability to ink to deter their predators but unfortunately for the Wunderpus, they have a reduced ink sac and are unable to release ink. When attacked, the Wunderpus is capable of releasing an arm, allowing it to escape from its predators. It will later regenerate its lost limb. It is unknown what the specific predators of the wunderpus octopus are, but it is believed that they are likely preyed upon by aggressive mantis shrimps, flounders and scorpion fishes.
