= Guy Coburn Robson =

British Zoologist

Guy Coburn Robson (11 Feb 1888–17 May 1945) was a British zoologist, specializing in Mollusca, who first named and described Mesonychoteuthis hamiltoni, the colossal squid among many other species.

== Career ==
Guy graduated from Oxford University in 1910 (age 22) and started employment with the British Museum of Natural History (Natural History Museum) later that year (officially from 1911). Soon after gaining employment with the museum, he spent 5 months at the marine biological station in Naples on an Oxford University Biological Scholarship, before returning to the British Museum of Natural History. Guy would remain employed with the museum until Nov 1936, being Deputy Keeper of the Zoology Department from 1931 to Nov 1936. Despite being a world authority on Cephalopods, Robson never received a doctorate.

In addition he received a MA (Hon) from Oxford University in 1922, Robson was heavily involved with the Malacological Society of London, being the editor from 1926-1928, vice president form 1928-1930, and president from 1930-1933.

From 1936 up until his death in 1945 (at age 57) Guy C. Robson was institutionalized with hospitals and sanatoriums in the UK, largely due to personal circumstances involving a marriage breakdown which resulted in him being let go from the museum (later authors erroneously attributed this rapid decline to Guy's brief service in WW1).

== Work on Cephalopoda ==
Robson is best known for his contributions to the taxonomy (systematics) of the Cephalopoda, and from 1914 onwards he published 55 papers and a monograph on this group, describing over 40 species and genera of Cephalopoda. His more notable contributions being the description of the Colossal Squid (Mesonychoteuthis hamiltoni) in 1925, description of the octopus genus Grimpella in 1928, and his two part monograph on the Cephalopoda (part 1 in 1929, and part 2 in 1932), which included descriptions and re-descriptions of many species as well as new genera (e.g., Grimpoteuthis and Teretoctopus).

Some species described by G.C. Robson:

- Abraliopsis gilchristi (G. C. Robson, 1924)
- Austrorossia enigmatica (G. C. Robson, 1924)
- Amphitretus thielei G. C. Robson, 1930
- Cirroctopus glacialis (G. C. Robson, 1930)
- Inopinoteuthis hoylei (G. C. Robson, 1932)
- Megaleledone setebos (G. C. Robson, 1932)
- Mesonychoteuthis hamiltoni G. C. Robson, 1925
- Octopus briareus G. C. Robson, 1929
- Sepiadarium auritum G. C. Robson, 1914
- Sepiella cyanea G. C. Robson, 1924
- Stauroteuthis gilchristi (G. C. Robson, 1924)
- Stigmatoteuthis arcturi G. C. Robson, 1948
- Teretoctopus indicus G. C. Robson, 1929
- Teretoctopus alcocki G. C. Robson, 1932
- Thaumeledone gunteri G. C. Robson, 1930

== Work on Evolution ==
Robson contributed to the book The Variations of Animals in Nature (co-authored with O. W. Richards, 1936) which argued that although the fact of evolution is well established, the mechanisms are largely hypothetical and undemonstrated. The book claims that most differences among animal populations and related species are non-adaptive. It was published before major developments in the modern synthesis and contains critical evaluation of natural selection. It was positively reviewed in science journals in the 1930s. Zoologist Mark Ridley has noted that "Robson and Richards suggested that the differences between species are non-adaptive and have nothing to do with natural selection."

Historian Will Provine has commented that the book "has been in disrepute since the late 1940s because of its antagonism to natural selection" but notes that it was the "best known general work on animal taxonomy" before the work of Julian Huxley and Ernst Mayr. Huxley in Evolution: The Modern Synthesis (1942), described the book as "an undue belittling of the role of selection in evolution."

== Eponymy ==
The following marine species have been named after Guy Robson to honour his contribution to science:

- Abralia robsoni Grimpe, 1931
- genus Robsonella W. Adam, 1938
- Onykia robsoni (Adam, 1962)
- Amphioctopus robsoni (Adam, 1941)
- Opisthoteuthis robsoni O'Shea, 1999
- Uroteuthis (Photololigo) robsoni (Alexeyev, 1992)
- Digitosepia robsoni (Massy, 1927)

== Select Publications ==
- Guide to the Mollusca exhibited in the Zoological Department, British Museum (1923)
- The Species Problem (1926)
- A Monograph of the Recent Cephalopoda. Based on the collections in the British Museum, Natural History (two volumes, 1929–1932)
- The Variation of Animals in Nature (with O. W. Richards) (1936)

== Quotes ==
"In short, we do not believe that Natural Selection can be disregarded as a possible factor in evolution. Nevertheless, there is so little positive evidence in its favour, so much that appears to tell against it, and so much that is as yet inconclusive, that we have no right to assign to it the main causative role in evolution." (The Variation of Animals in Nature, 1936)
