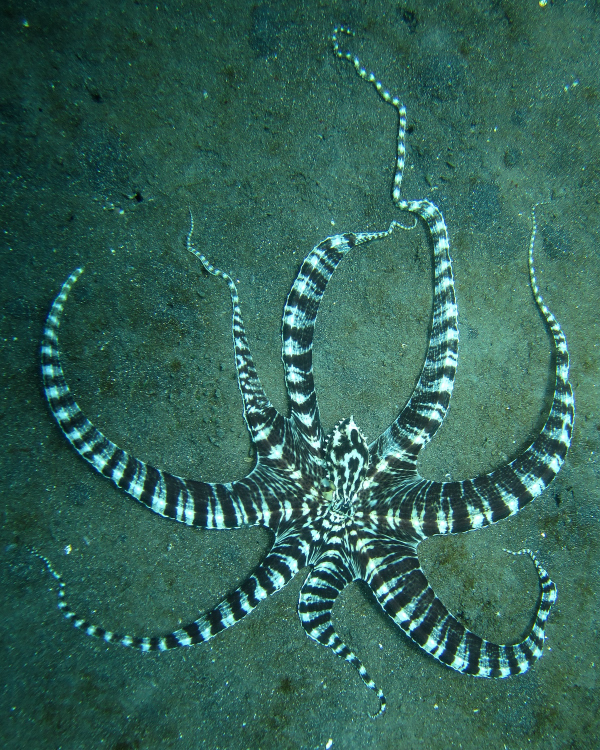

Conservation status
- Least Concern (IUCN 3.1)

Scientific classification
- Kingdom: Animalia
- Phylum: Mollusca
- Class: Cephalopoda
- Order: Octopoda
- Family: Octopodidae
- Genus: Thaumoctopus; Norman & Hochberg, 2005
- Species: T. mimicus

Binomial name
- Thaumoctopus mimicus Norman & Hochberg, 2005

= Mimic octopus =

Indo-Pacific species of octopus

The mimic octopus (Thaumoctopus mimicus) is a species of octopus from the Indo-Pacific region. Like other octopuses, it uses its chromatophores to disguise itself. It is noteworthy for being able to impersonate a wide variety of other marine animals. While many animals mimic either their environment or other animals to avoid predation, the mimic octopus and its close relative the wunderpus are the only ones known to actively imitate several animals in order to elude predators.

== Appearance ==
The mimic octopus is a smaller octopus, growing to a total length of about 60 cm (2 ft), including arms, with a diameter approximately that of a pencil at their widest. Small horns protrude from each eye. The octopus' natural color is light brown/beige, but it usually takes on a more noticeable hue of striped white and brown to scare off predators by imitating poisonous species. According to DNA sequence analysis, the second evolved trait was the simultaneous development of its lengthy arms and its flatfish-like swimming ability. By transfusing these traits together, the octopus transforms to a bold color pattern while swimming like a flatfish when hunting for food or resting.

== Habitat and range ==
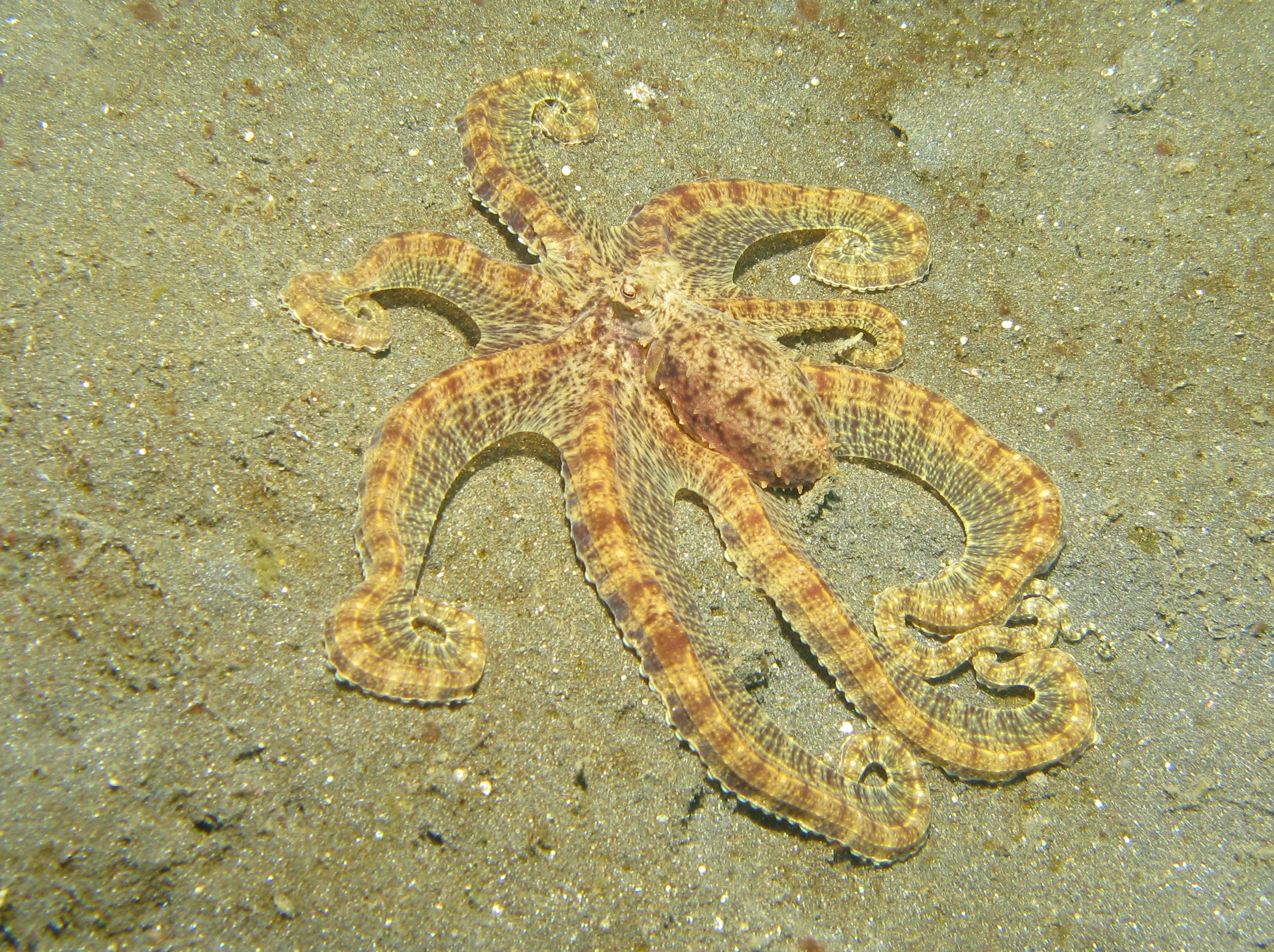
Mimic octopus showing typical pattern

The mimic octopus was first discovered off the coast of Sulawesi, Indonesia in 1998 on the bottom of a muddy river mouth. It has since been found to inhabit the Indo-Pacific, ranging from the Red Sea and Gulf of Oman in the west to New Caledonia in the east, and Gulf of Thailand and the Philippines in the north to the Great Barrier Reef in south. Most documented observations are from Indonesia. It is primarily found in areas with sand or silt at depths of less than 15 m (49 ft).

== Behavior ==
The mimic octopus uses a jet of water through its funnel to glide over the sand while searching for prey, which mostly consists of small fish, crabs, and worms. It prefers river mouths and estuaries, as opposed to reefs which are usually preferred as shelter by other types of octopus.

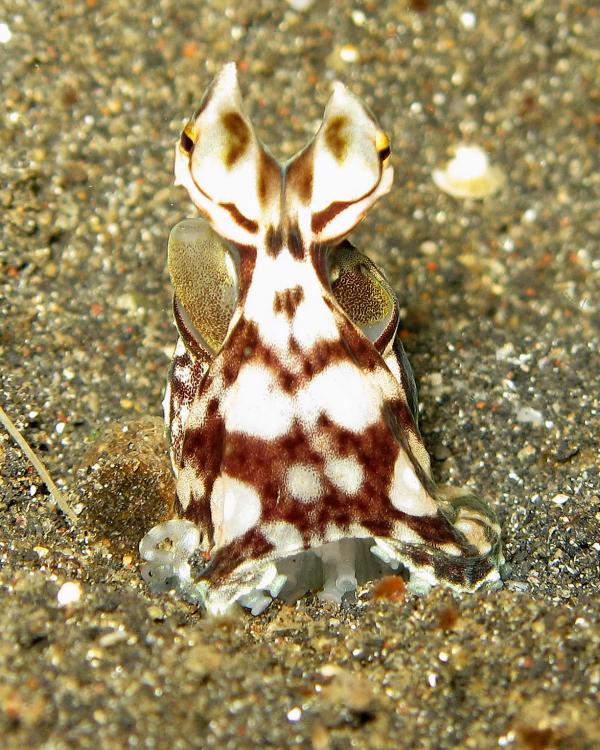
Mimic octopus showing a variant pattern

Mimic octopuses have been observed mimicking numerous different species of animals, some animals being mimicked more often than others. Among the animals mimicked are lionfish (the octopus holds its arms out radially to mimic the fish's spines), sea snake (hiding 6 of its arms, it holds the remaining 2 parallel to each other), jellyfish (by inflating its mantle and trailing its arms behind it), and zebra sole (holding all 8 arms behind it as it uses its siphon to swim). The octopus' mimicry of flatfish may be its preferred guise; a 2008 study showed that over a period of 5 days, nearly 500 instances of flatfish mimicry were seen by a single individual. Not only does the mimic octopus use its ability to defend against predators, it also uses aggressive mimicry to approach wary prey, for example by mimicking a crab as an apparent mate.

The mimic octopus has also been observed to mimic sessile animals such as small sponges, tube worm tubes, or colonial tunicates. While the mimic octopus retains its ability to camouflage with its surroundings while swimming, they are also able to do this even when not swimming. Mimic octopuses have remarkable control over their skin. While colorblind, their bodies are quite reflective, which is what allows them to blend in with their surroundings, such as sand, coral, rocks and algae.

The octopus may be able to intelligently use its mimicry based on the situation. For example, a mimic octopus which was being harassed by damselfish mimicked a banded sea snake, a known damselfish predator. The mimic octopus has also been observed in opportunistic mimicry with a jawfish.

Mimic octopuses stand out from other octopus species because of their extraordinary ability to mimic and imitate a wide variety of species. Most species that are able to mimic can only mimic a single animal, whereas the mimic octopus can switch between various disguises: up to 18 different marine animals. They do this not by just changing their color, but also their shape and behavior.

== Intelligence ==
Octopuses are generally a highly intelligent species. Their brains are especially large for an invertebrate. Their brains contain roughly around 300 million neurons and their arms contain roughly 50 million neurons, with each of their eight arms having its own neural network. This allows them to a have better control, sense of touch, and decision-making abilities. Their brains allow for rapid learning, camouflage, mimicry, memory, vision, and motor control. Much like other invertebrates, octopuses don't only rely on instinct, but rather on experience and learning. Mimicry is considered to be an evolved behavior.

== Feeding ==
The mimic octopus can be described as either a hunter or a forager. It is believed to be a hunter because scientists have observed and recorded the octopus having the ability to stalk prey and hunt down small fish and catch them. More often, however, the mimic octopus can be seen foraging for food. It does this by using a jet of water through its siphon to glide over the sand while searching for prey, and using its slender arms to reach into crevices in coral, as well as holes in the sand, and use its suction cups to grab small crustaceans and eat them. Because the mimic octopus prefers to live in shallow, murky waters, it is believed that its diet consists almost exclusively of small fish and crustaceans. They are believed to be carnivores, and are not known to eat any type of plant or vegetation.

The mimic octopus goes on multiple hunting trips per day, seeking prey such as echinoderms, crustaceans and fish.
