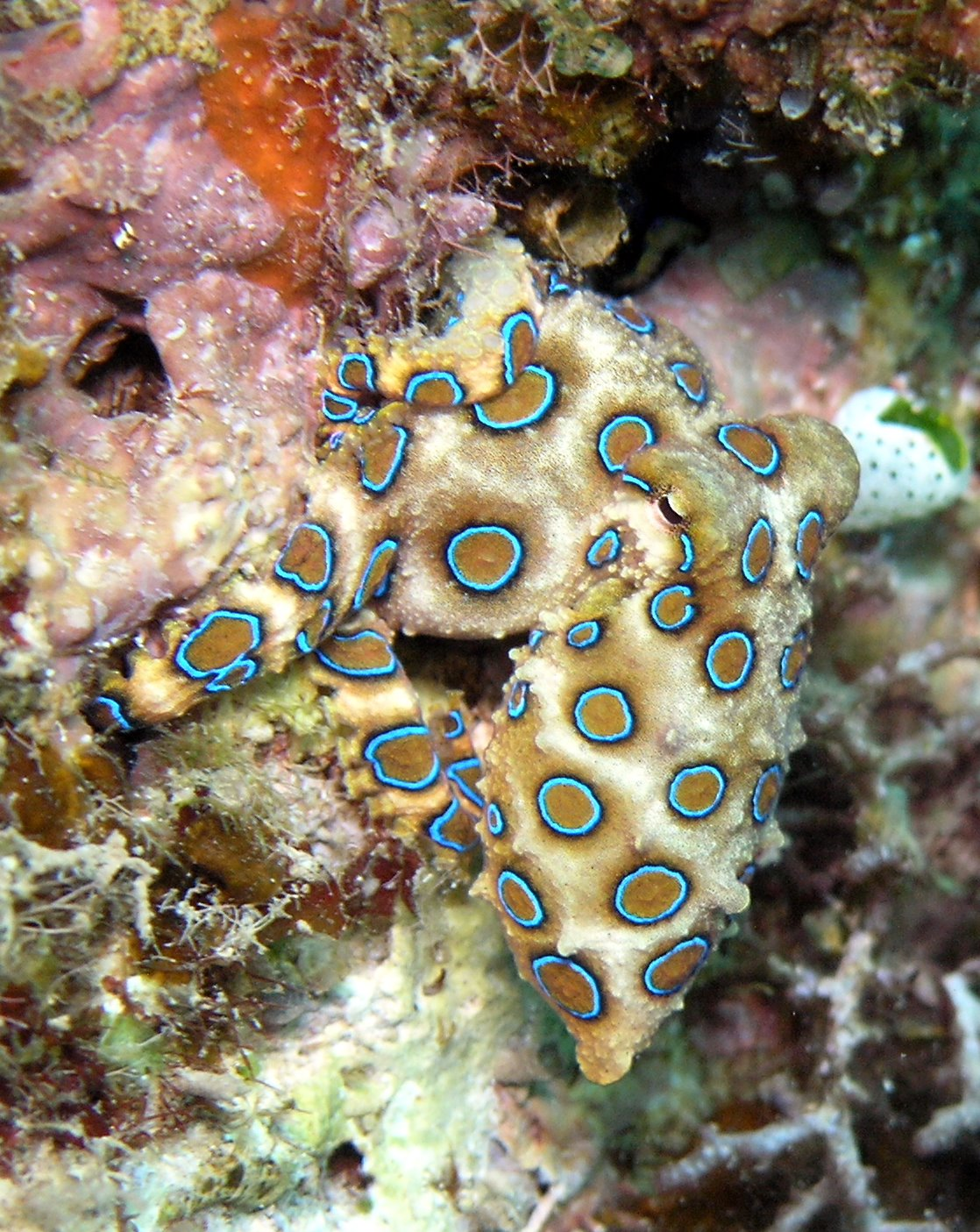
- Greater blue-ringed octopus (Hapalochlaena lunulata)
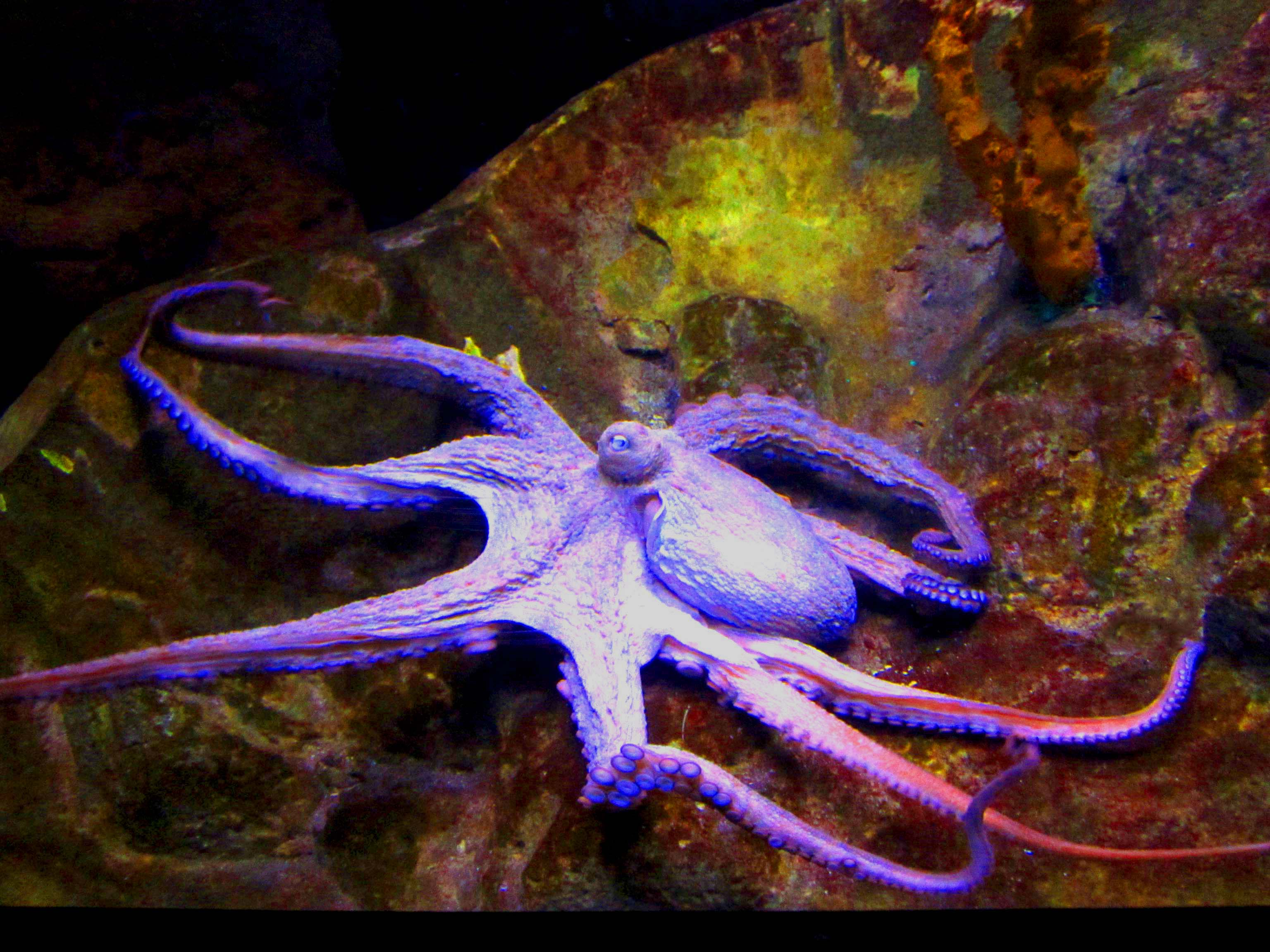
- Octopus vulgaris

Scientific classification
- Kingdom: Animalia
- Phylum: Mollusca
- Class: Cephalopoda
- Order: Octopoda
- Superfamily: Octopodoidea
- Family: Octopodidae; Orbigny, 1839

Genera
- See text

= Octopodidae =

Octopodidae Temporal range: Cenomanian–present

Family of octopuses

The Octopodidae are a family containing the majority of known octopus species (about 175 species).

== Genera ==
The World Register of Marine Species lists these 23 genera:

- Abdopus Norman & Finn, 2001 (7 species)
- Ameloctopus Norman, 1992 (monotypic)
- Amphioctopus P. Fischer, 1882 (16 species)
- Callistoctopus Taki, 1964 (11 species)
- Cistopus Gray, 1849 (4 species)
- Euaxoctopus Voss, 1971 (3 species)
- Galeoctopus Norman, Boucher & Hochberg, 2004 (monotypic)
- Grimpella Robson, 1928 (monotypic)
- Hapalochlaena Robson, 1929 (4 species)
- Histoctopus Norman, Boucher-Rodoni & Hochberg, 2009 (2 species)
- Lepidoctopus Haimovici & Sales, 2019 (monotypic)
- Macrochlaena Robson, 1929 (monotypic)
- Macroctopus Robson, 1928 (monotypic)
- Macrotritopus Grimpe, 1922 (2 species)
- Octopus Cuvier, 1798 (99 species)
- Paroctopus Naef, 1923 (3 species)
- Pinnoctopus d'Orbigny, 1845 (8 species)
- Pteroctopus P. Fischer, 1882 (6 species)
- Robsonella Adam, 1938 (2 species)
- Scaeurgus Troschel, 1857 (5 species)
- Teretoctopus Robson, 1929 (2 species)
- Thaumoctopus Norman & Hochberg, 2005 (monotypic)
- Wunderpus Hochberg, Norman & Finn, 2006 (monotypic)

Several undescribed species are known, such as the white V octopus which may or may not be placed in the genus Thaumoctopus. Two fossil genera are also known: Styletoctopus from the Late Cretaceous (Cenomanian) of the Sannine Formation in Lebanon, and Bolcaoctopus from the Early Eocene (Ypresian) of Monte Bolca, Italy.

The following is a maximum likelihood phylogenetic tree based on 13 protein-coding genes partitioned by codon, and nodes with less than 70% bootstrap support are collapsed, forming polytomies. The root, being Vampyroteuthis infernalis, is not shown:

- - - Stauroteuthidae
    - Cirroteuthidae
  - - Cirroctopodidae
    - - Opisthoteuthidae
      - Grimpoteuthidae
- - Eledonidae
  - - - Megaleledonidae
      - Amphitretidae
    - Bathypolypodidae
    - Enteroctopodidae
    - - - Argonautidae
        - Tremoctopodidae
      - Octopodidae
        - - - Octopus variabilis
            - Octopus minor
          - Callistoctopus luteus
        - - Octopus fitchi
          - - Octopus cyanea
            - - - Amphioctopus fangsiao
                - - Amphioctopus aegina
                  - - Amphioctopus neglectus
                    - Amphioctopus marginatus
              - - Cistoctopus chinensis
                - Cistoctopus taiwanicus
              - - Octopus vulgaris
                - - Octopus mimus
                  - - Octopus bimaculatus
                    - Octopus bimaculoides
