= Cephalopod intelligence =

Measure of cognitive ability of cephalopods

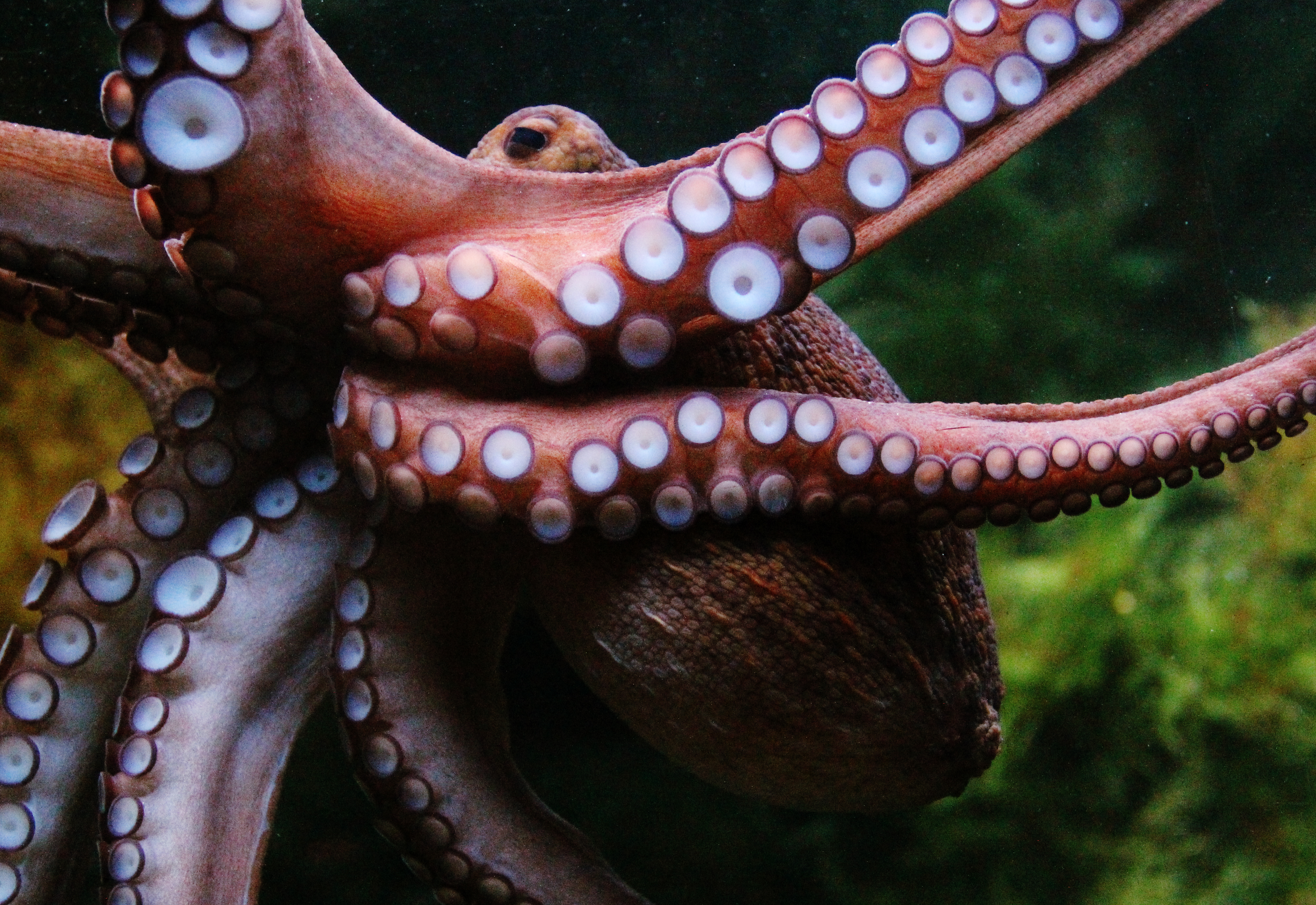
An octopus, with around 500 million neurons

Cephalopod intelligence is a measure of the cognitive ability of the cephalopod class of molluscs.

Intelligence is generally defined as the process of acquiring, storing, retrieving, combining, and comparing information and skills. Though these criteria are difficult to measure in nonhuman animals, cephalopods are the most intelligent animals not to be vertebrates. The study of cephalopod intelligence also has an important comparative aspect in the broader understanding of animal cognition because it relies on a nervous system that is fundamentally different from those of vertebrates. In particular, the Coleoidea subclass (cuttlefish, squid, and octopuses) is thought to contain the most intelligent invertebrates. It is also thought to be an important example of advanced cognitive evolution in animals, though nautilus intelligence is also a subject of growing interest among zoologists.

The scope of cephalopod intelligence and learning capability is controversial within the biological community, complicated by the inherent complexity of quantifying non-vertebrate intelligence. In spite of this, the existence of impressive spatial learning capacity, navigational abilities, and predatory techniques in cephalopods is widely acknowledged. Cephalopods are legally classified as being at least as sentient as vertebrates in some countries and have been compared to intelligent extraterrestrials, due to their convergently evolved mammal-like intelligence.

== Brain size and structure ==
Cephalopods have large, well-developed brains, and their brain-to-body mass ratio is among the largest of all invertebrates, falling between that of endothermic and ectothermic vertebrates. The large nerve fibers of the cephalopod mantle have been widely used for many years as experimental material in neurophysiology; their large diameter (due to lack of a myelin sheath) makes them relatively easy to study compared with other animals. Unlike vertebrates, octopus arms have their own neurons, so they do not require input from their central brain to function. In fact, two-thirds of an octopus's neurons are in the nerve cords of its arms. These are capable of complex reflex actions without input from the brain.

== Behavior ==
=== Predation ===
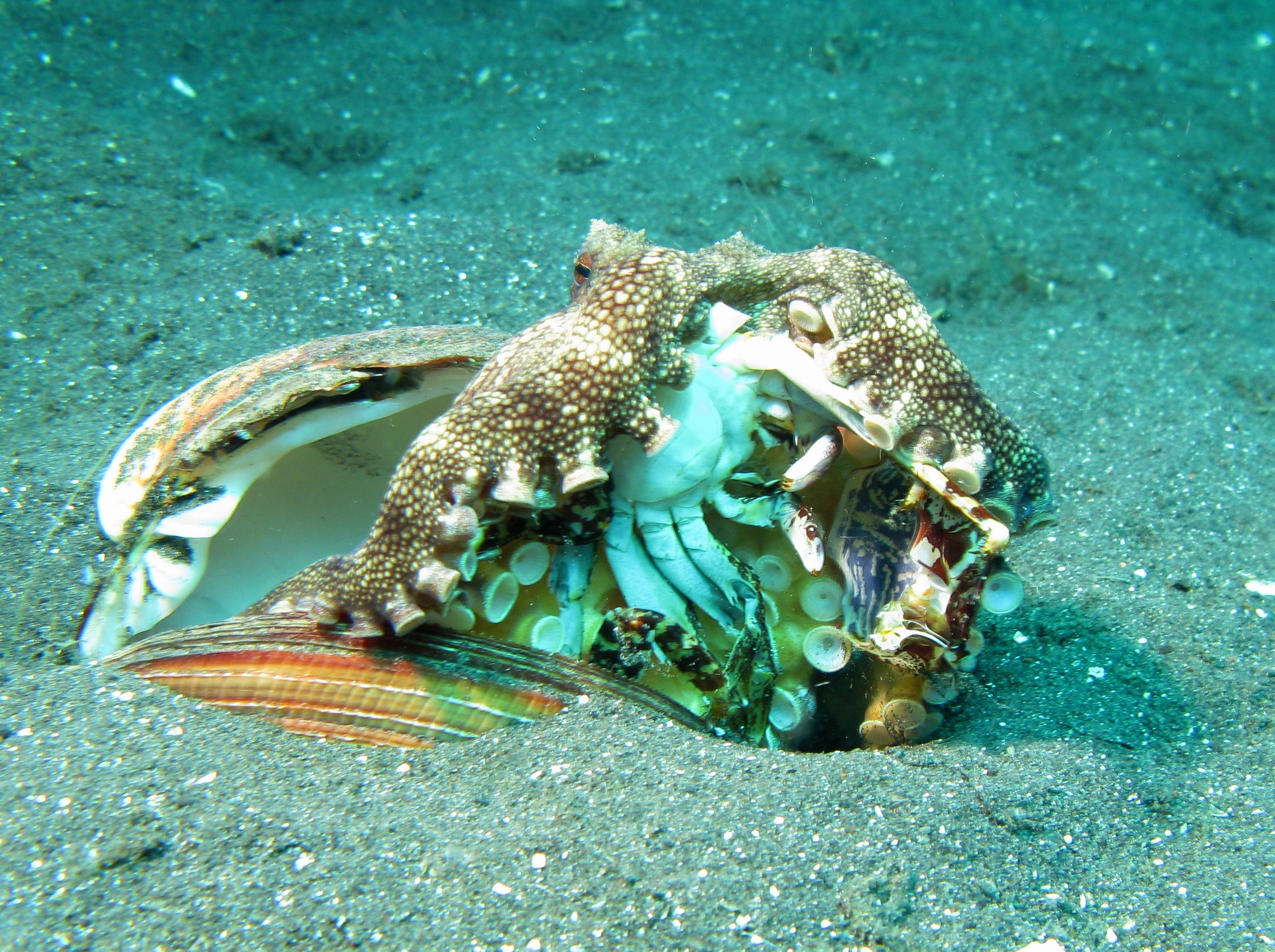
A veined octopus eating a crab

Unlike most other molluscs, all cephalopods are active predators (with the possible exceptions of the bigfin squid and vampire squid). Their need to locate and capture their prey has likely been the driving force behind the development of their intelligence.

Crabs, the preferred food source of most octopus species, present significant challenges with their powerful pincers and their potential to exhaust the cephalopod's respiration system from a prolonged pursuit. Because of these challenges, octopuses sometimes seek out lobster traps and steal the bait inside. They are also known to climb aboard fishing boats and hide in the containers that hold dead or dying crabs.

Captive octopuses have also been known to climb out of their tanks, travel some distance, enter another aquarium to feed, and return to their own aquariums.

=== Communication ===
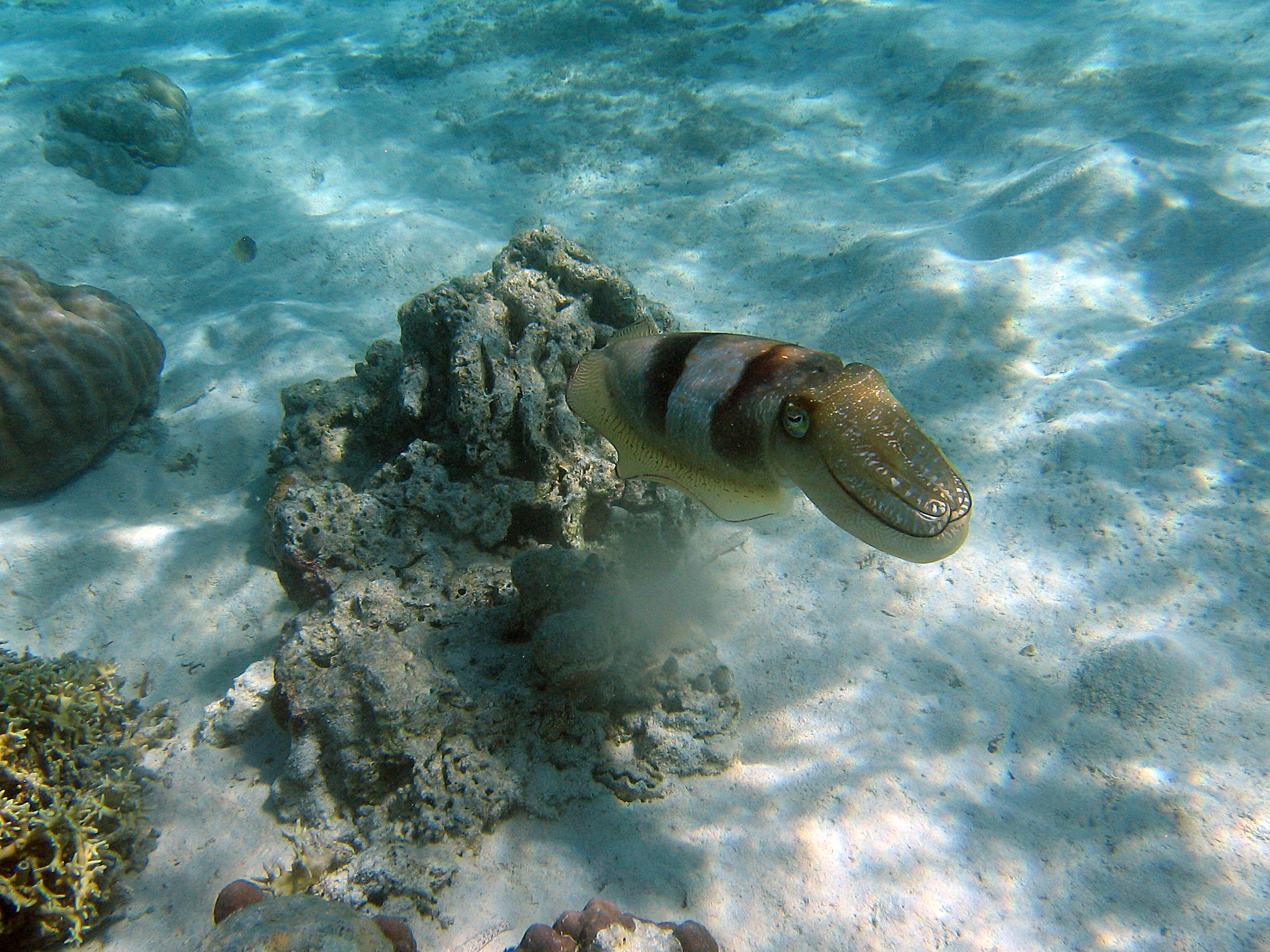
A cuttlefish employing camouflage in its natural habitat

Although often believed to not be the most social of animals, this has been challenged by some contemporary researchers such as Dr. David Scheel & Dr. Peter Godfrey-Smith and Dr. Roy Caldwell & Dr. Christine Huffard, who all argue that octopuses and other cephalopods possess behaviours that do not readily match their standard textbook-described asocial nature. Some cephalopods are highly social creatures. When isolated from their own kind, some species have been observed shoaling with fish.

Cephalopods are able to communicate visually using a diverse range of signals. To produce these signals, cephalopods can use four types of communication elements: chromatic (skin coloration), skin texture (e.g. rough or smooth), posture, and locomotion. Some cephalopods are capable of rapid changes in skin colour and pattern using chromatophores, iridophores, and leucophores. This ability almost certainly evolved for camouflage. However, some squid and cuttlefish use flashing colors and patterns to communicate with each other in various courtship rituals. Caribbean reef squid can even discriminate between recipients, sending one message using color patterns to a squid on their right, while they send another message to a squid on their left. Tests show that octopuses become more sociable when exposed to the psychoactive drug MDMA.

The Humboldt squid shows high amounts of cooperation and communication in its hunting techniques. This was one of the first observations of cooperative hunting in invertebrates.

It is believed that squids are slightly less intelligent than octopuses and cuttlefish; however, various species of squid act more socially than other octopuses and cuttlefish, leading some researchers to conclude that squids are on par with dogs in terms of intelligence.

=== Object manipulation ===
Octopus opening a container with a screw cap

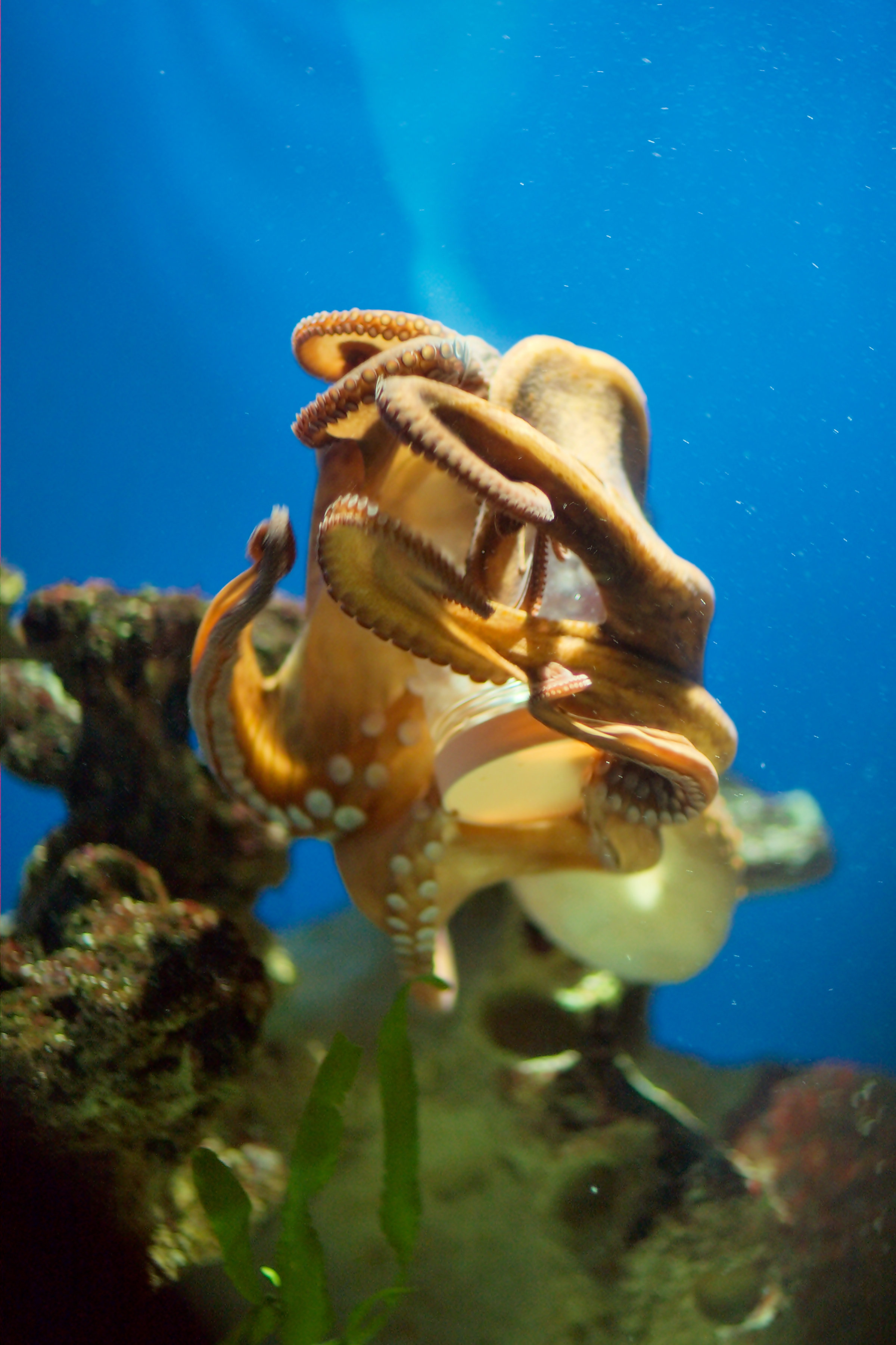

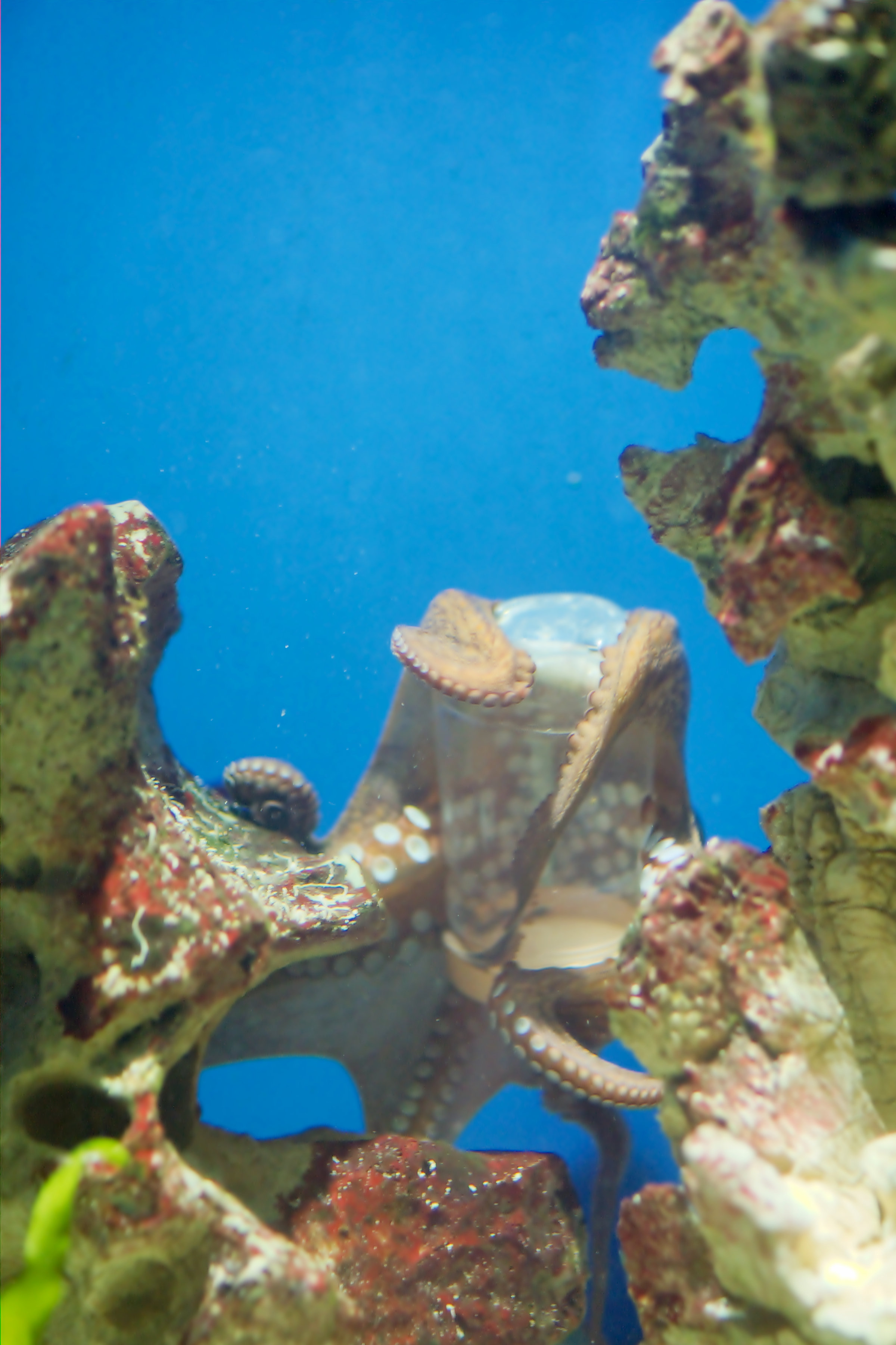

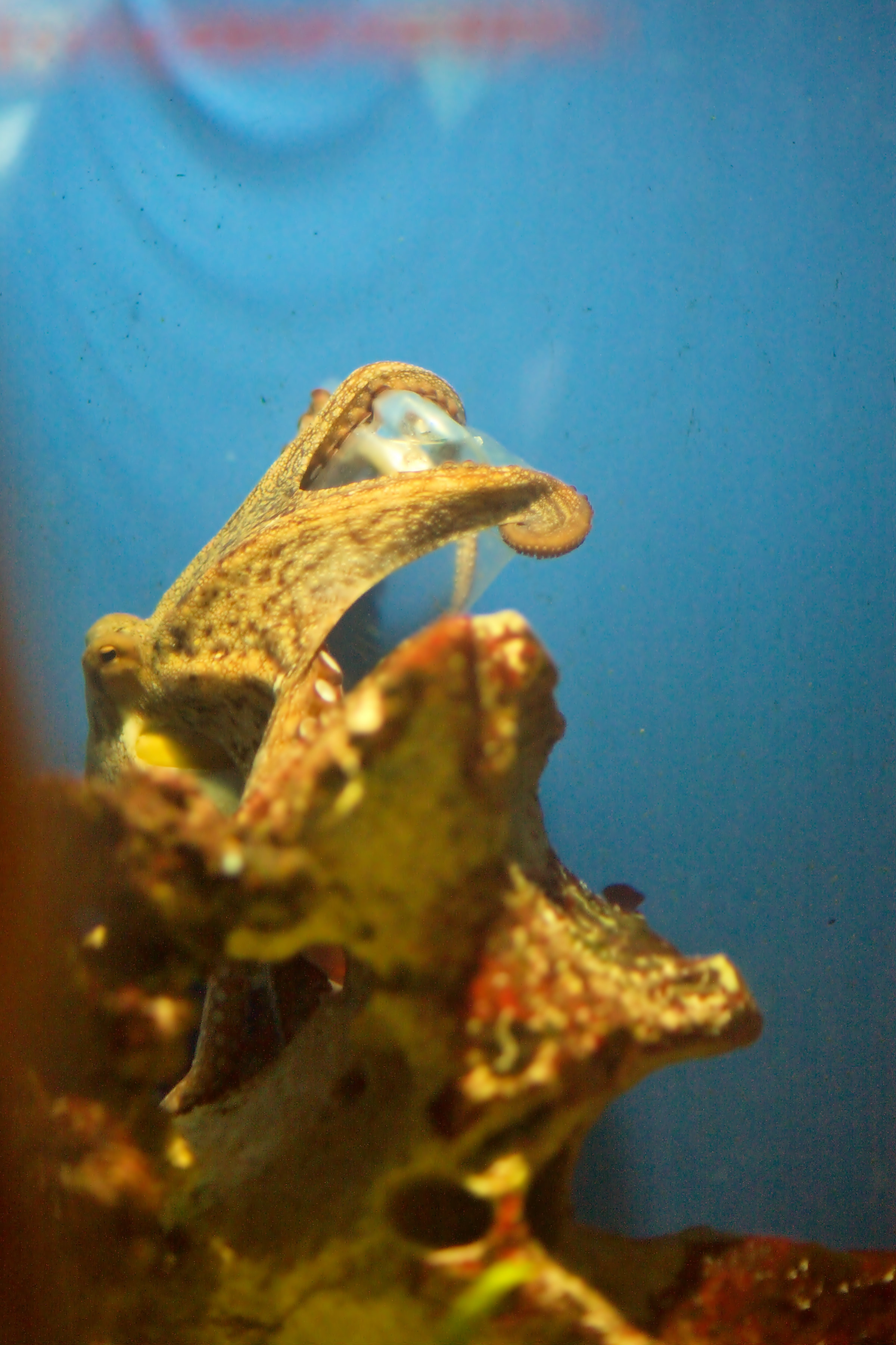

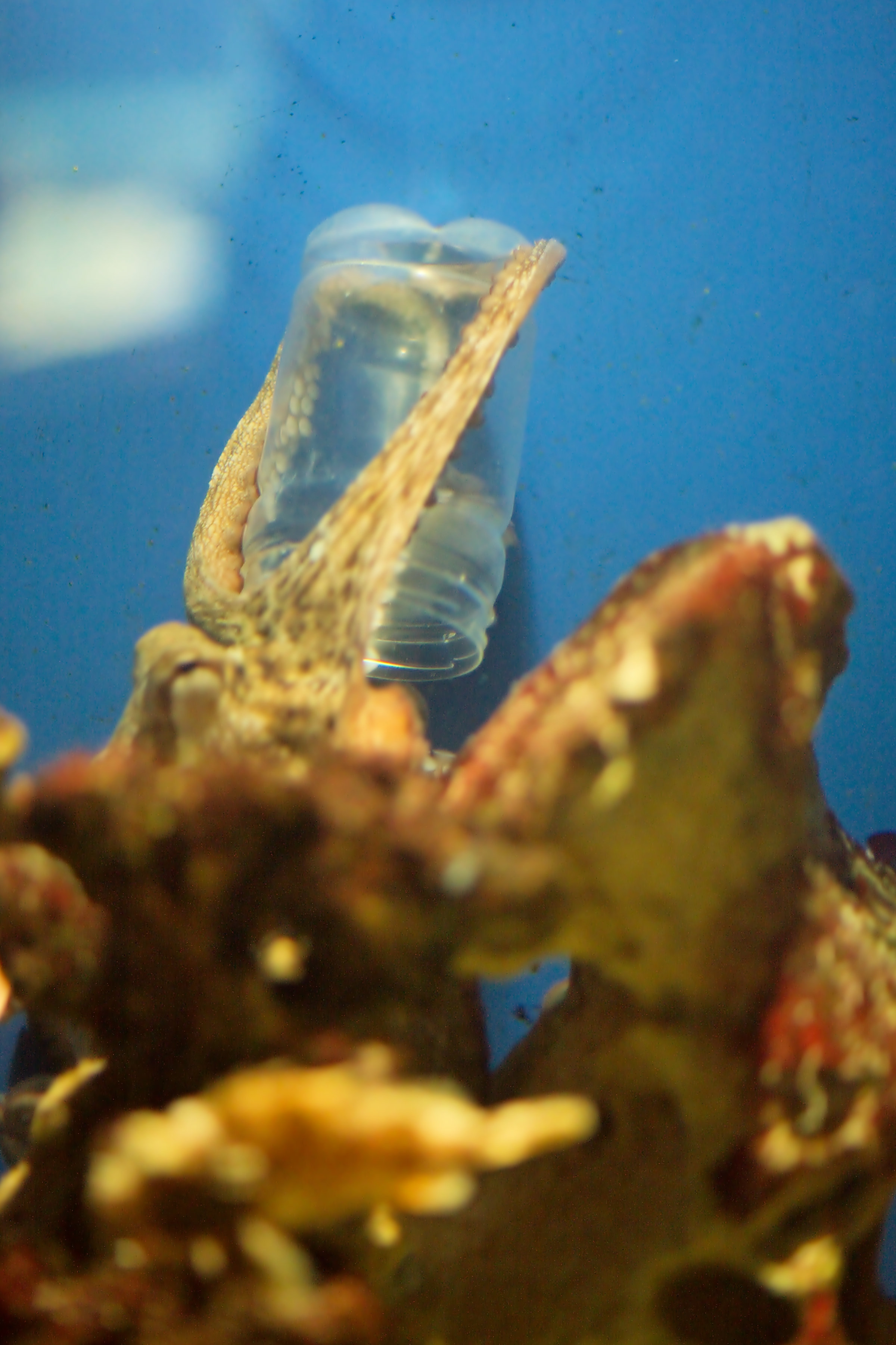

The highly sensitive suction cups and prehensile arms of octopuses, squid, and cuttlefish allow them to hold and manipulate objects, including the use of tools. Octopuses can solve complex puzzles requiring pushing or pulling actions, and can also unscrew the lids of containers and open the latches on acrylic boxes in order to obtain the food inside. They can also remember solutions to puzzles and learn to solve the same puzzle presented in different configurations.

Smaller individuals of the Common blanket octopus (Tremoctopus violaceus) can hold the tentacles of the Portuguese man o' war (whose venom they are immune to), both as a means of protection and as a method of capturing prey.

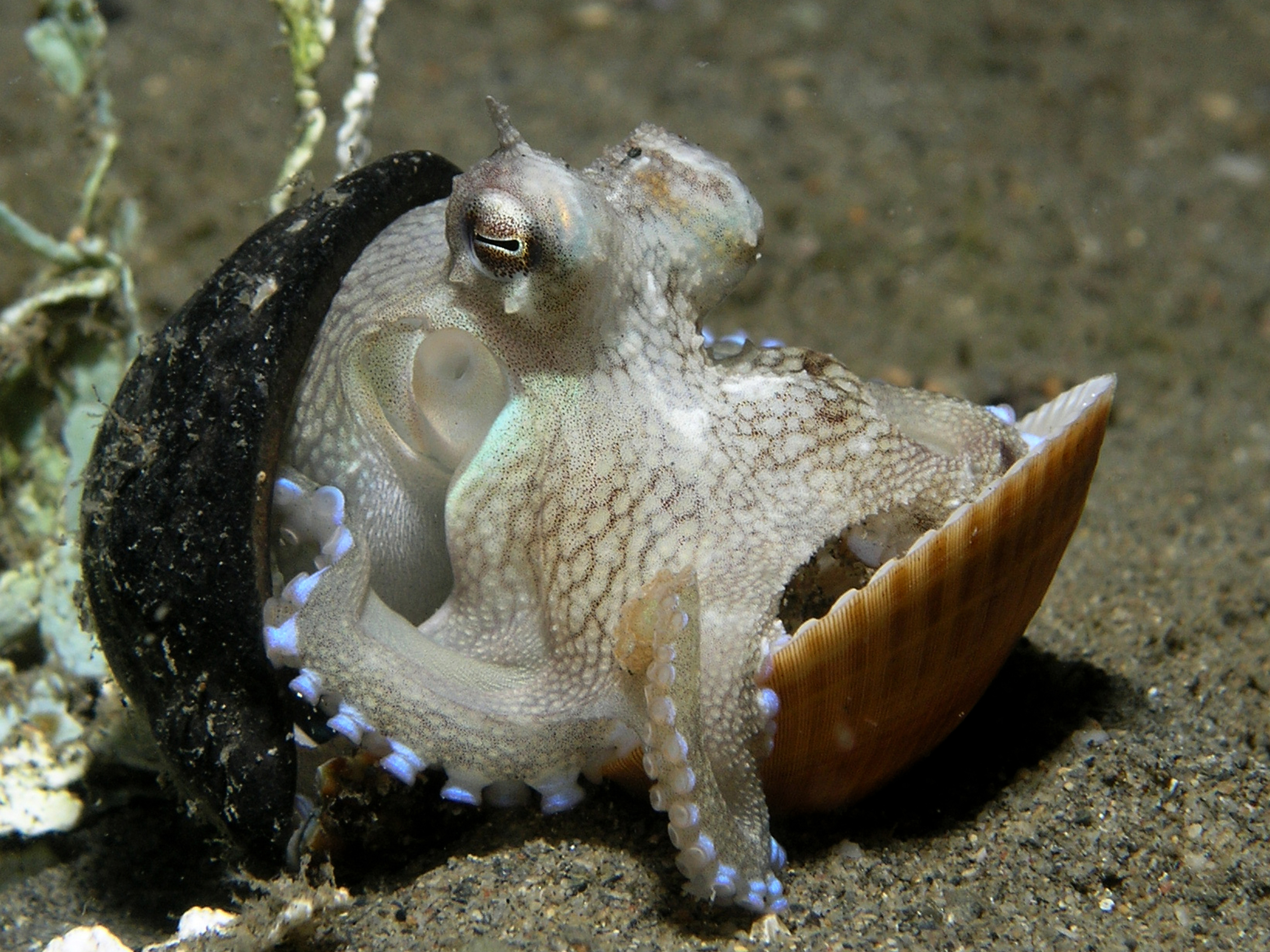
A small veined octopus (4–5 cm in diameter) using a nut shell and clam shell as shelter

At least four individuals of the Veined octopus (Amphioctopus marginatus) have been observed retrieving discarded coconut shells, transporting them some distance, and then reassembling them for use as a shelter. It is theorized that the octopuses used seashells for the same purpose before humans made coconut shells widely available on the sea floor. Other sea creatures construct homes in a similar manner; for example, most hermit crabs use the discarded shells of other species for habitation, and some crabs place sea anemones on their carapaces for protection and camouflage. However, this behavior lacks some of the complexity of octopuses' behavior, which involves picking up and carrying a tool for later use. (This argument remains contested by a number of biologists, who claim that the shells actually provide protection from bottom-dwelling predators during transport.)

Octopuses have also been known to deliberately place stones, shells, and even bits of broken bottles to form walls that constrict their den openings. In laboratory studies, the Caribbean dwarf octopus (Octopus mercatoris), a small pygmy species of octopus, has been observed to block its lair using plastic Lego bricks.

Cephalopods benefit from environmental enrichment, which indicates behavioral and neuronal flexibility not exhibited by most other invertebrates. For example, captive octopuses require stimulation or they will become lethargic.

At the Sea Star Aquarium in Coburg, Germany, an octopus named Otto was known to juggle hermit crabs around, as well as strike the aquarium glass with a rock. On more than one occasion, Otto even caused a short circuit by shooting a jet of water at the overhead lamp. Otto was even claimed to have developed a sense of personal taste as to the arrangement of his tank.

=== Lethargy ===
It has been suggested that octopus have a complex, vertebrate-like sleep pattern, with two separate stages similar to rapid and non-rapid eye movement stages necessary for the cognitive functions of vertebrates. "Quiet sleep" stage usually involves behaviors such as eyes closing, flat body posture, and white-skin pattern. This stage usually lasts around 60 minutes. After the "quiet stage", the octopus moves onto an "active sleep" stage which lasts about 1 minute. In the "active sleep" stage, octopus has more eye and body movements as well as increased breathing rate. Although the octopus is suggested to have the most obvious color changing during the "active sleep" stage, a very brief and fast "color-flash" has been observed during the "quiet sleep" stage as well.

== Learning ==
In laboratory experiments, octopuses can readily be trained to distinguish between different shapes and patterns.

In one study on observational learning, common octopuses (observers) were allowed to watch other octopuses (demonstrators) select one of two objects that differed only in color. Subsequently, the observers consistently selected the same object the demonstrators did. This study concluded that octopuses are capable of using observational learning. However, this is disputed by some. Both octopuses and nautiluses are capable of vertebrate-like spatial learning. Additionally, cuttlefish have been shown to have the capacity for future planning and reward processing after being tested with the Stanford marshmallow experiment.

== Protective legislation ==
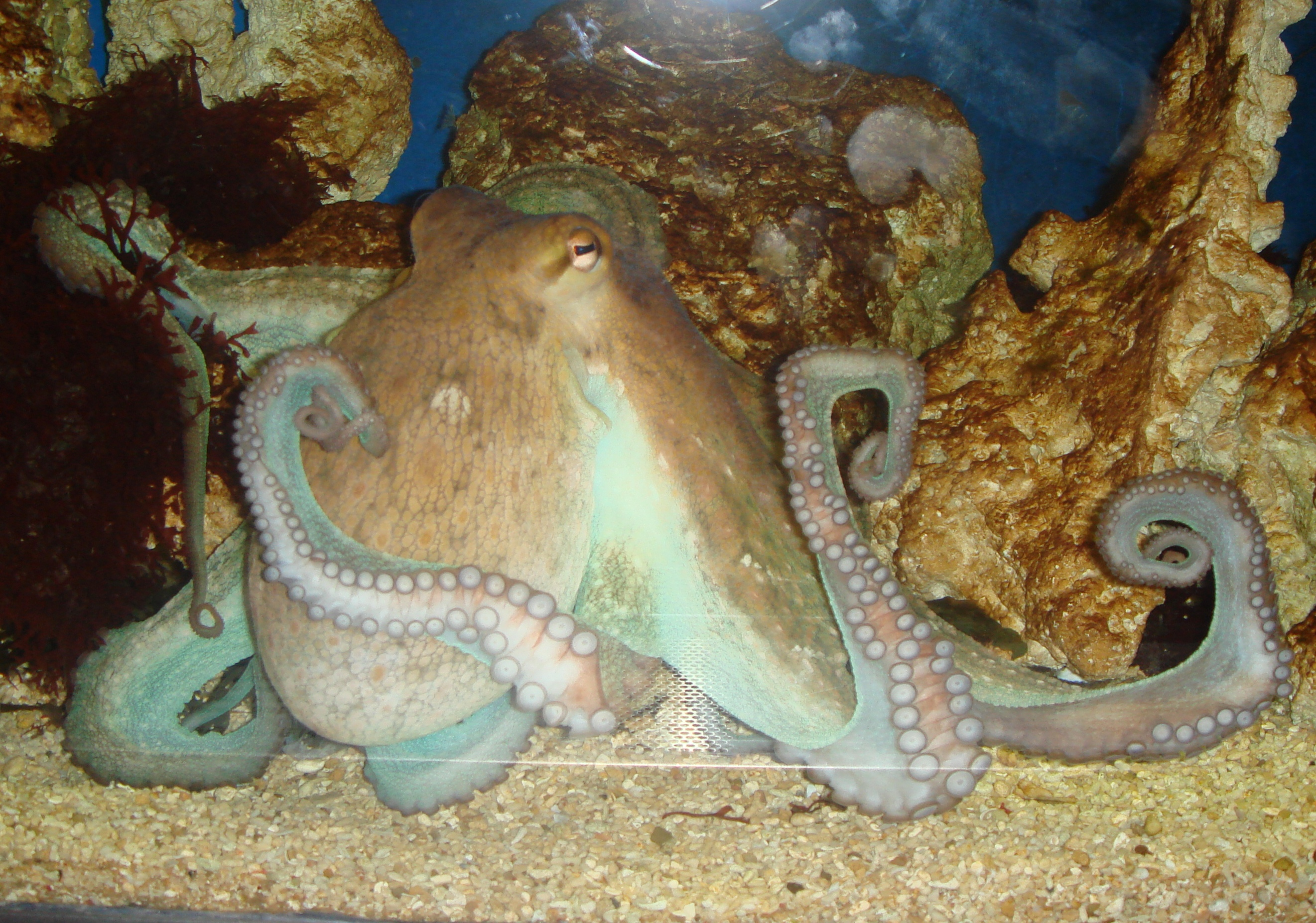
An octopus in a public aquarium

Due to their intelligence, cephalopods are commonly protected by animal testing regulations that do not usually apply to invertebrates.

In the UK from 1993 to 2012, the common octopus (Octopus vulgaris) was the only invertebrate protected under the Animals (Scientific Procedures) Act 1986. Since 2022, all vertebrates, cephalopods, and decapods have been recognised as sentient by the Animal Welfare (Sentience) Act 2022. Cephalopods are the only invertebrates protected under the 2010 European Union directive "on the protection of animals used for scientific purposes". Some scholars have argued for increased protections for cephalopods in the United States as well.

== See also ==
- Animal cognition
- Animal consciousness
- Octopolis and Octlantis
- Pain in cephalopods
