= Mark Norman (marine biologist) =

Australian marine biologist

Mark Douglas Norman (1960s to present) is a scientist living in southern Australia. He works as a Chief Conservation Scientist with Parks Victoria.

Prior to 2016 he worked as a curator and marine biologist through the University of Melbourne and Museum Victoria. For over a decade in this role, Norman worked exclusively with cephalopods and was a leading scientist in the field, having discovered over 150 new species of octopuses. The best known of these is probably the mimic octopus.

== Notable publications ==
- Norman M., Reid A. (2000) A Guide to Squid, Cuttlefish and Octopuses of Australasia (The Gould League of Australia and CSIRO Publishing: Melbourne).
- Norman M. (2000) Cephalopods: A World Guide (ConchBooks: Hackenheim, Germany). This book contains over 800 color photographs of cephalopods in their natural habitat.

== Species described by Mark Norman ==
The following species have been described by M. Norman either individually or with co-authors.

- Ameloctopus litoralis Norman, 1992
- Cistopus platinoidus Sreeja, Norman & Biju Kumar, 2015
- Microeledone mangoldi Norman, Hochberg & Boucher-Rodoni, 2004
- Octopus (Abdopus) capricornicus Norman & Finn, 2001
- Octopus abaculus Norman & Sweeney, 1997
- Octopus aspilosomatis Norman, 1993
- Octopus berrima Stranks & Norman, 1992
- Amphioctopus exannulatus Norman, 1993
- Amphioctopus mototi Norman, 1993
- Amphioctopus neglectus Nateewathana & Norman, 1999
- Octopus nocturnus Norman & Sweeney, 1997
- Amphioctopus rex Nateewathana & Norman, 1999
- Amphioctopus siamensis Nateewathana & Norman, 1999
- Scaeurgus nesisi Norman, Hochberg & Boucher-Rodoni, 2005
- Thaumoctopus mimicus Norman & Hochberg, 2005
