= Amphioctopus rex =

Conservation status
- Least Concern (IUCN 3.1)

Scientific classification
- Kingdom: Animalia
- Phylum: Mollusca
- Class: Cephalopoda
- Order: Octopoda
- Family: Octopodidae
- Genus: Amphioctopus
- Species: A. rex

Binomial name
- Amphioctopus rex (Nateewathana & Norman, 1999)

Synonyms
- Octopus rex Nateewathana & Norman, 1999

Species of octopus

Amphioctopus rex, commonly known as the king ocellate octopus (French: poulpe royal ocellé, Spanish: pulpo rey ocelado), is a species of octopus belonging to the genus Amphioctopus. Amphioctopus rex is native to the tropical Indo-Pacific region and was first described in 1999 after being discovered off the coast of Thailand. Males of the species have been known to grow up to 30.5 cm (12.0 in), and females up to 35.8 cm (14.1 in).

== Distribution and habitat ==
Amphioctopus rex is native to the tropical continental waters of the northern Indo-Pacific region, ranging from the coasts of Kerala in western India through the Andaman Sea and Gulf of Thailand to the waters around Indonesia and as far south as northern Australia. It inhabits coastal waters with muddy or sandy substrates, occurring in the intertidal and subtidal zones at depths of up to 80 m (260 ft).

The range of this species includes the coasts of northern Australia (Queensland, the Northern Territory, and Western Australia), Bangladesh, India, Indonesia, Malaysia, Myanmar, Singapore, and Thailand.
