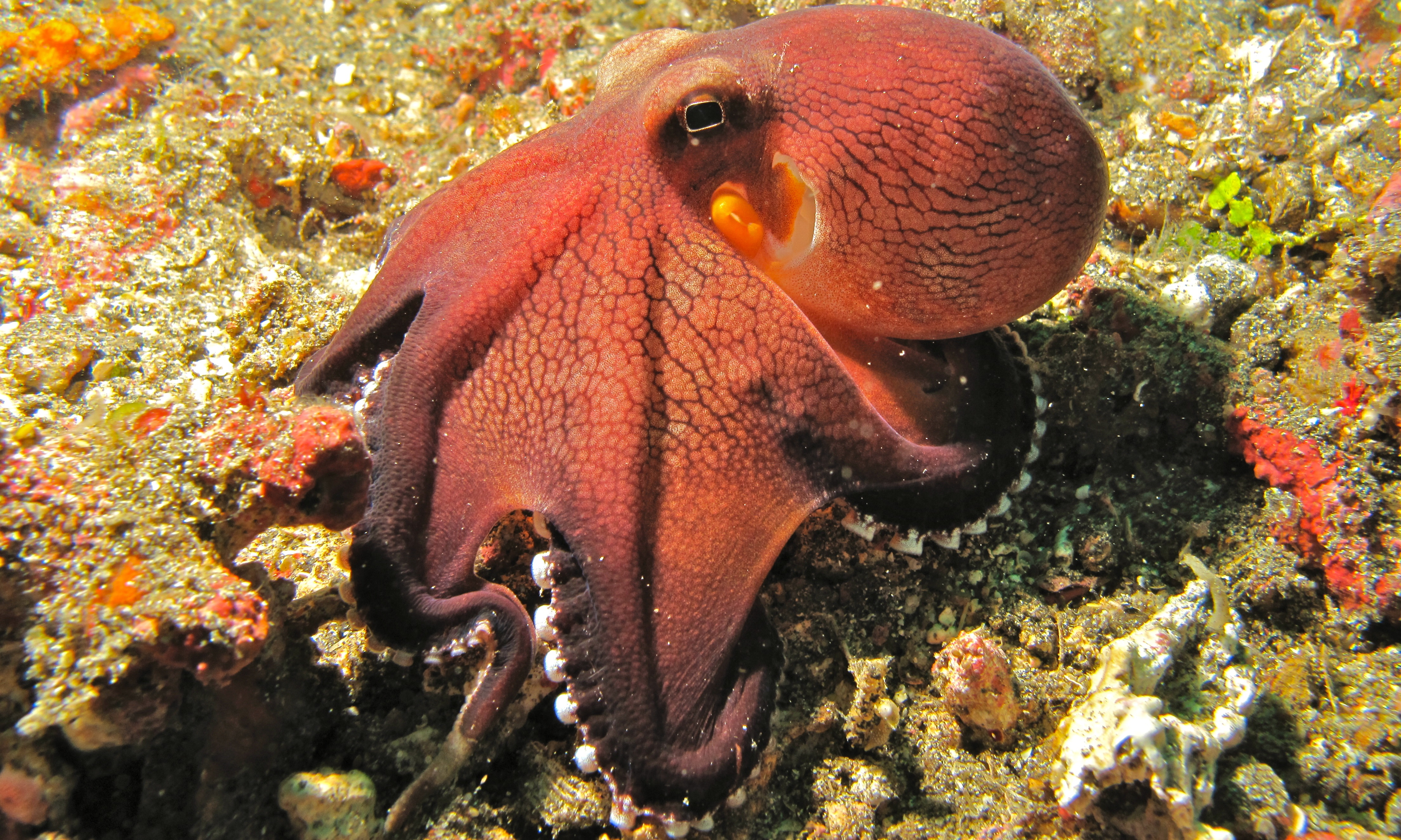

Conservation status
- Least Concern (IUCN 3.1)

Scientific classification
- Kingdom: Animalia
- Phylum: Mollusca
- Class: Cephalopoda
- Order: Octopoda
- Family: Octopodidae
- Genus: Amphioctopus
- Species: A. marginatus

Binomial name
- Amphioctopus marginatus (Taki, 1964)

Synonyms
- Octopus marginatus Taki, 1964; Octopus striolatus Dong, 1976

= Amphioctopus marginatus =

Species of cephalopod

Amphioctopus marginatus, also known as the coconut octopus and veined octopus, is a medium-sized cephalopod found in the tropical waters of the western Pacific Ocean and the Indian Ocean. It prefers sandy substrates with plentiful shells or litter. It commonly preys upon shrimp, crabs, and clams, and displays unusual behavior for octopuses, being one of only two species known to exhibit bipedal walking. The coconut octopus is also known for collecting and using tools; it gathers coconut shells and seashells and uses these for shelter.

== Taxonomy ==
Amphioctopus marginatus is a species of octopus in the family Octopodidae. The species was first described in 1964 by Japanese malacologist Iwao Taki as Octopus marginatus, and later transferred to the genus Amphioctopus, thus becoming Amphioctopus marginatus. Taki chose the Latin name marginatus (literally margined, from marginum) due to the pale border around the eyes. In 1976, Dong Zhengzhi described the species Octopus striolatus, but this name is not recognized as taxonomically valid.

== Characteristics ==
The main body of the octopus is typically between 5 centimeters (2 in) and 10 centimeters (4 in) long; including the arms, it can measure up to approximately 30 centimeters (12 in) in length. The octopus can weigh up to 400 grams (14 oz). The octopus displays a typical color pattern with dark branching lines similar to veins. The arms are usually dark in color, with contrasting light suckers. In many color displays, a lighter triangular area can be seen immediately below the eye. In 2017, the complete mitochondrial genome of A. marginatus was successfully sequenced, showing the species to be closely related to Amphioctopus aegina.

== Behavior and habits ==
The species preys predominately on crustaceans such as Calappa crabs, along with bivalves. Eggs are laid in clutches of 100,000 and are 3 millimetres (0.12 in) in length; they are laid as long chains woven together. The female octopus lays eggs within a shelter such as a coconut shell where she will guard and tend to her eggs; like most octopuses, the female coconut octopus will starve to death whilst brooding. Eggs take between 15 and 17 days to hatch and the paralarvae are planktonic.

=== Locomotion ===
In March 2005, researchers at the University of California, Berkeley, published an article in Science in which A. marginatus was reported to show bipedal locomotion, or "stilt-walking". This involves rolling two arms to walk while the other six arms are used to disguise itself; the researchers speculated that the disguise might be meant to mimic the appearance of a rolling coconut. According to one of the researchers, Dr Crissy Huffard, octopuses are the only animals without a rigid endo- or exoskeleton who can walk bipedally. This behavior was first observed off the coast of Sulawesi, Indonesia, where coconut shell litter is common. A. marginatus is one of only two octopus species known to display such behavior, the other species being Abdopus aculeatus. In addition to "stilt-walking", A. marginatus also exhibits crawling behaviour typically seen in octopuses.

=== Tool use ===
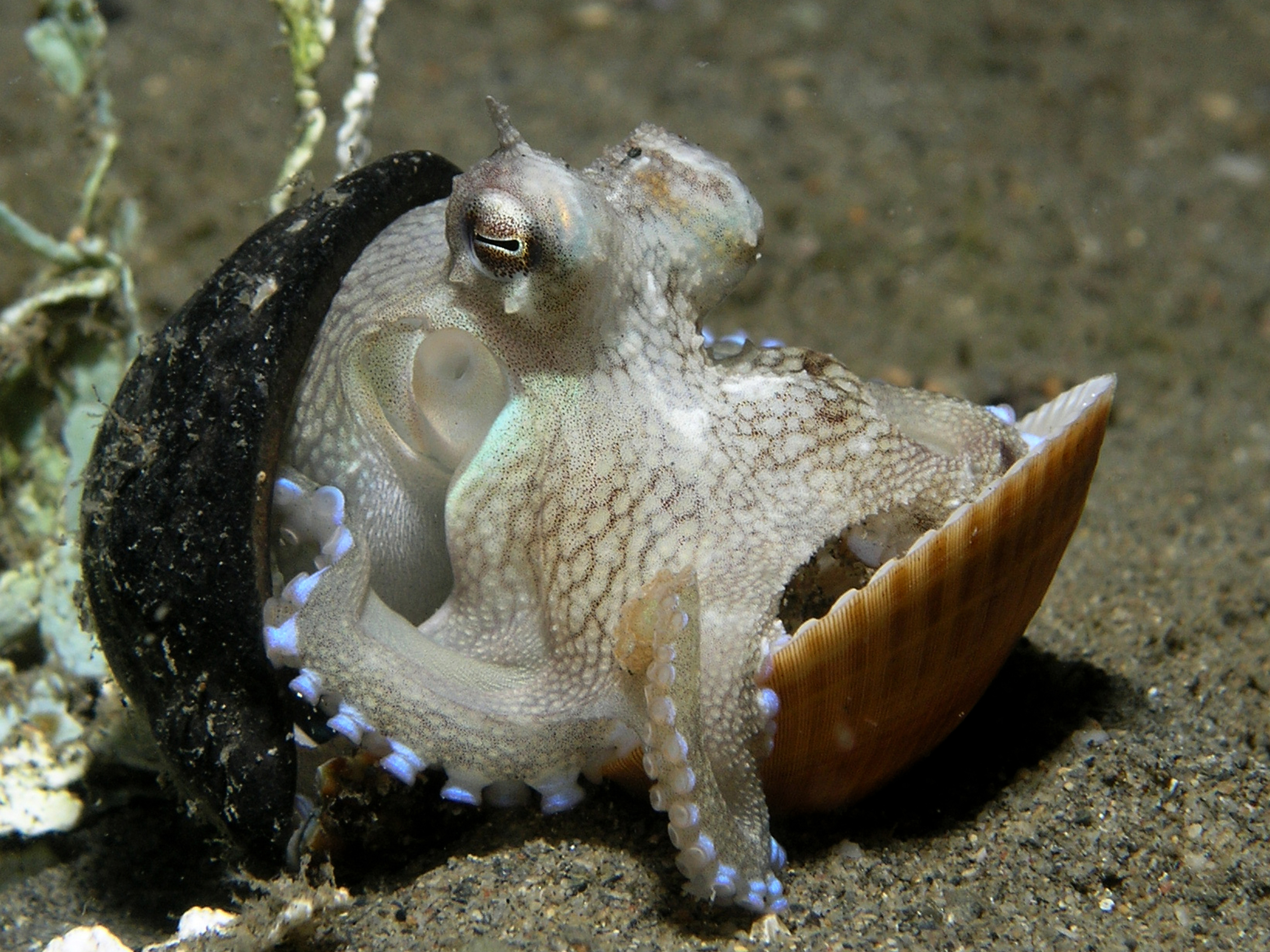
Small (4–5 cm diameter) individual using a nutshell and clamshell as shelter

In 2009, researchers from the Melbourne Museum in Australia observed the coconut octopus using tools for concealment and defense by gathering available debris to create a shelter. The researchers filmed the octopus collecting coconut half-shells from the sea floor that had been discarded by humans. They were then carried up to 20 meters (66 ft) and arranged around the body of the octopus to form a spherical hiding place similar to a clamshell. This behavior was observed in specimen in Bali and North Sulawesi, Indonesia, and is likely the first evidence of tool use in invertebrates. Other species of octopus had been observed using shells for hiding, but this was the first case in which shells were prepared and collected for later use, in what the Melbourne Museum has described as "true tool use". Octopuses will often engage in bipedal motion when carrying stacks of debris or items larger than themselves. The coconut octopus has been observed using a variety of materials for shelter, including coconut shells, clamshells, and man-made litter such as bottles.

== Distribution and habitat ==
The coconut octopus is broadly endemic to neritic, tropical waters in the Indian Ocean, Red Sea, Northwest and Western Pacific Ocean, and Southeast Asian Sea. Amphioctopus marginatus is listed as Least Concern on the IUCN's Red List. The primary threat faced by the species is fishing.

The species prefers shallow, subtidal waters along the continental shelf. The species has a maximum depth of 190 metres (620 ft), and can often be found in mud and sand substrates. Large numbers of coconut octopuses can often be found in sandy areas with a higher amount of litter that can be used for shelter.
