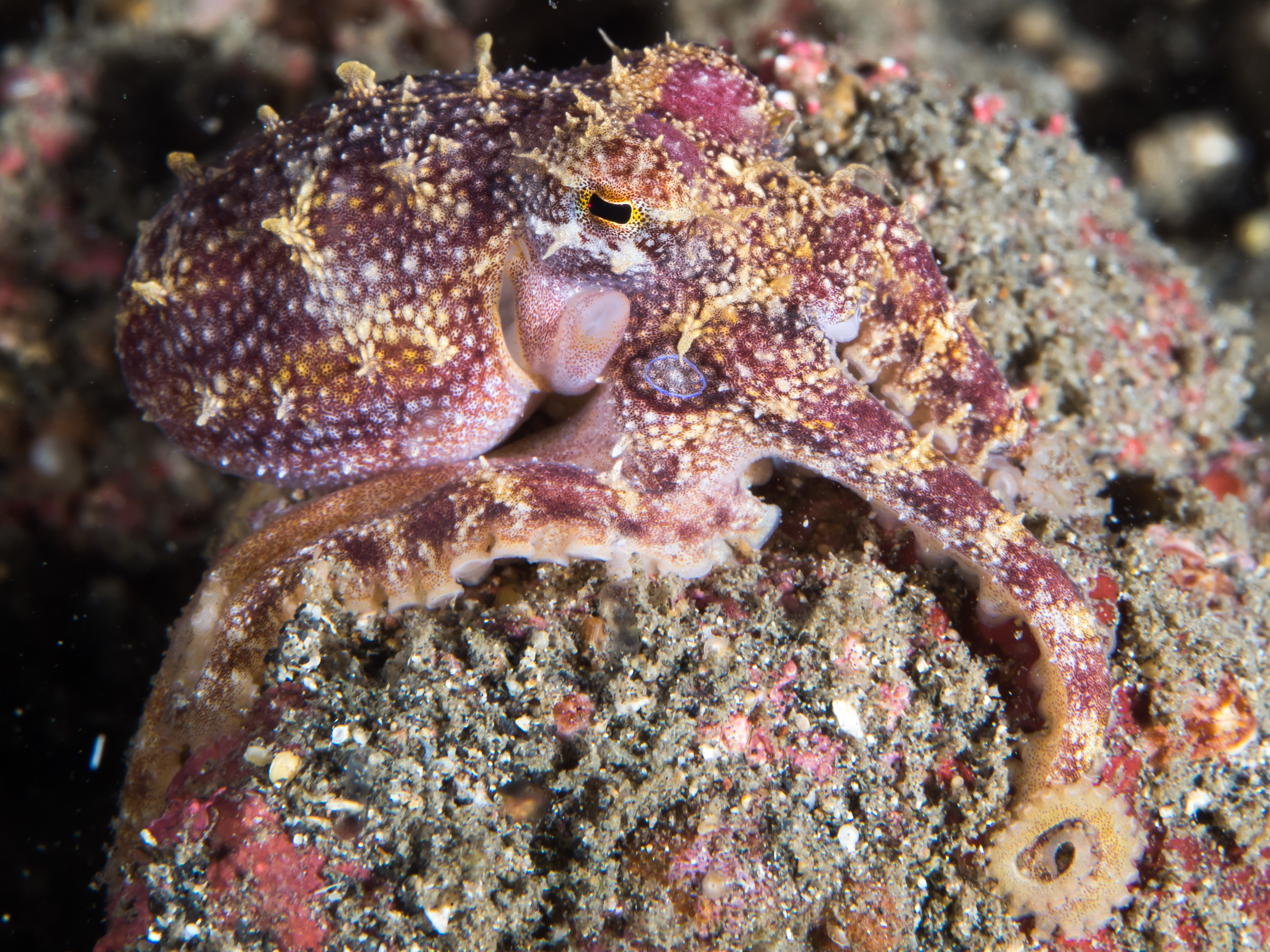

Conservation status
- Least Concern (IUCN 3.1)

Scientific classification
- Kingdom: Animalia
- Phylum: Mollusca
- Class: Cephalopoda
- Order: Octopoda
- Family: Octopodidae
- Genus: Amphioctopus
- Species: A. mototi

Binomial name
- Amphioctopus mototi (Norman, 1993)

Synonyms
- Octopus mototi Norman, 1993

= Amphioctopus mototi =

Species of octopus

Amphioctopus mototi, commonly known as the poison ocellate octopus, is a species of octopus in the genus Amphioctopus. Amphioctpus mototi was first described in 1993, and is found in the Pacific Ocean off the eastern coast of Australia, Rapa Iti, and New Caledonia. A. mototi measures up to 32 cm (13 in) in length with its mantle reaching up to 10 cm (3.9 in), and can weigh up to 300 g (11 oz). The species is believed to be potentially venomous; it has bright warning colours and is unusually known to be aggressive towards objects such as nets.
