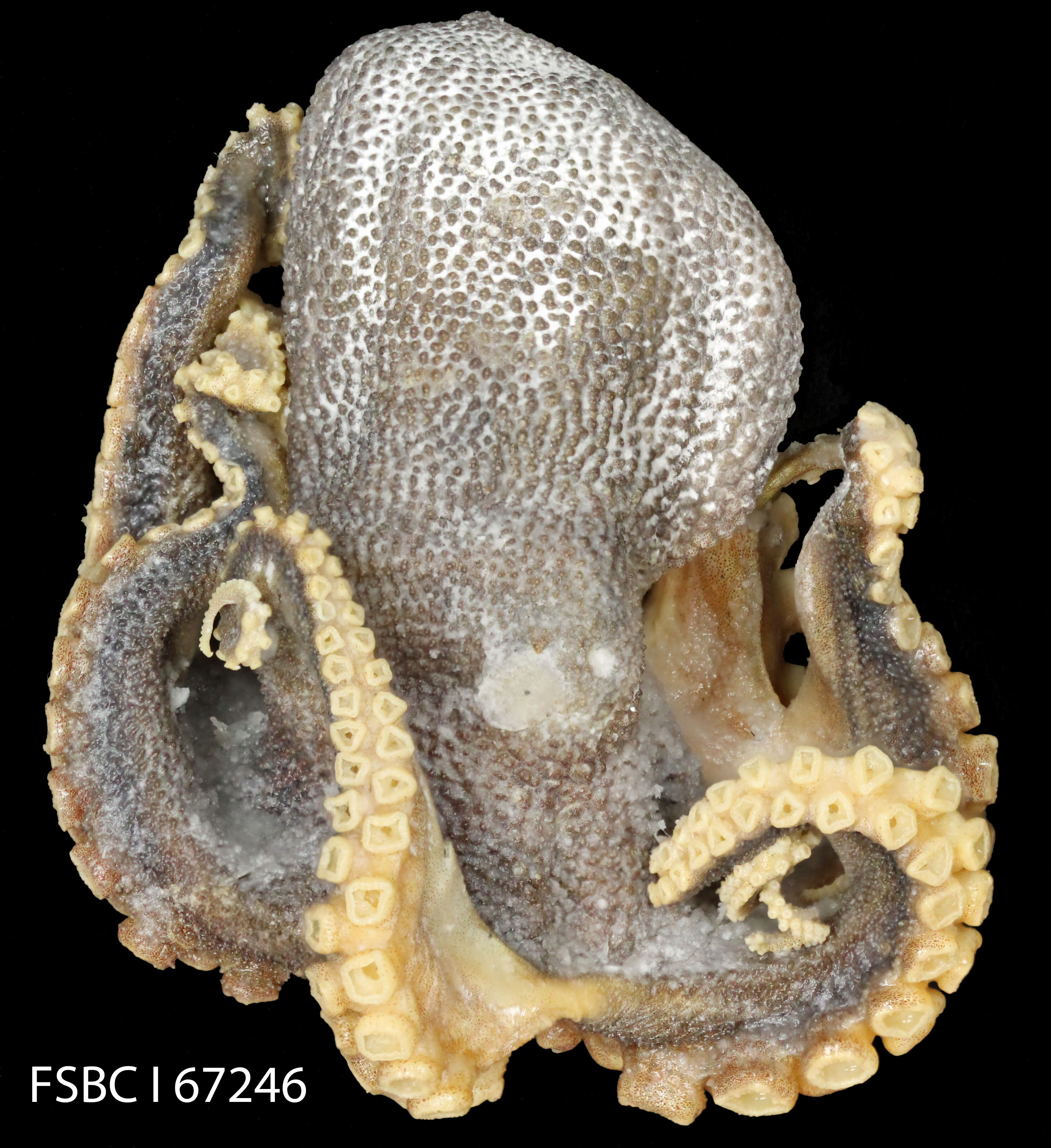

Conservation status
- Least Concern (IUCN 3.1)

- Apparently Secure (NatureServe)

Scientific classification
- Kingdom: Animalia
- Phylum: Mollusca
- Class: Cephalopoda
- Order: Octopoda
- Family: Octopodidae
- Genus: Amphioctopus
- Species: A. burryi

Binomial name
- Amphioctopus burryi (Voss, 1950)

Synonyms
- Octopus burryi Voss, 1950; Octopus vincenti Pickford, 1955

= Amphioctopus burryi =

Species of octopus

Amphioctopus burryi, commonly known as the brown-striped octopus or the Caribbean arm-stripe octopus, is a species of octopus belonging to the genus Amphioctopus. Amphioctopus burryi is native to the tropical Atlantic Ocean and was first described in 1950. Amphioctopus burryi grows to 25 cm (9.8 in) in length, with the mantle reaching 7 cm (2.8 in) long. A. burryi is a reddish-brown to orange colour, and may have a purple-brown stripe across some of its arms.

== Distribution and habitat ==
Amphioctopus burryi is found in the Gulf of Mexico, ranging from the coast of North Carolina to Brazil. It is also present off the coast of western Africa. This species is found in depths up to 200 m, and prefers sandy substrates.
