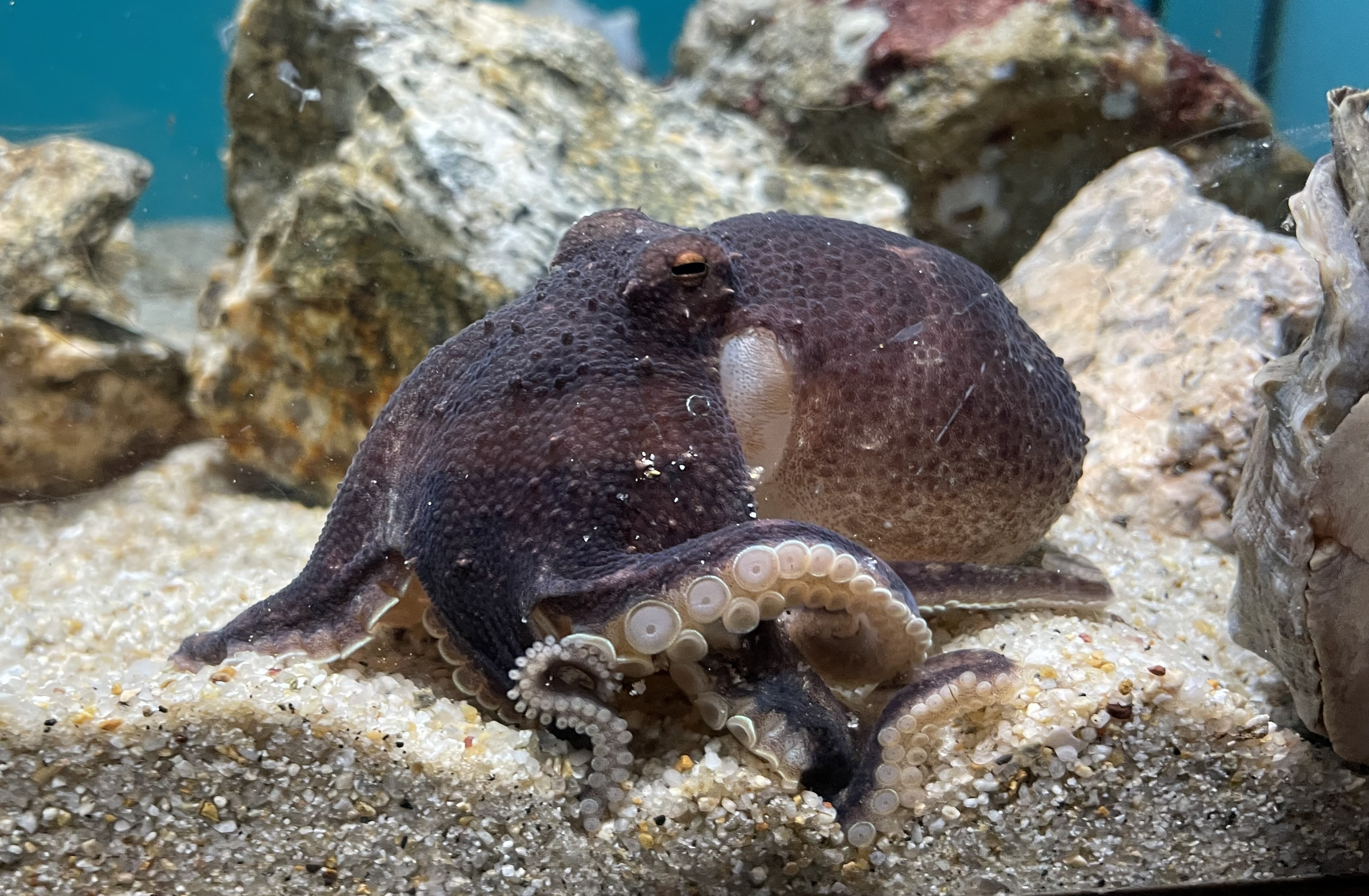

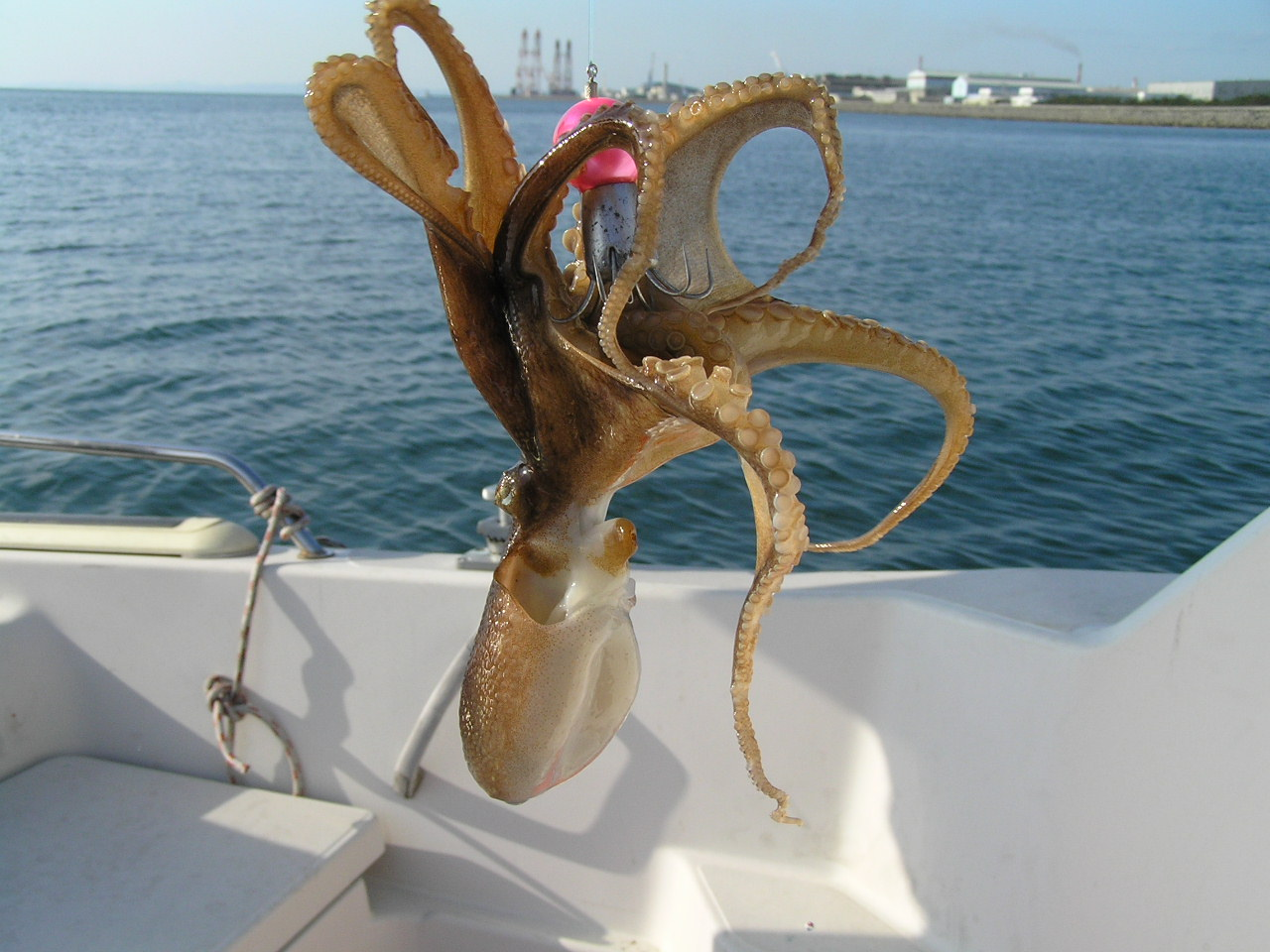

Conservation status
- Least Concern (IUCN 3.1)

Scientific classification
- Kingdom: Animalia
- Phylum: Mollusca
- Class: Cephalopoda
- Order: Octopoda
- Family: Octopodidae
- Genus: Amphioctopus
- Species: A. fangsiao

Binomial name
- Amphioctopus fangsiao (d'Orbigny, 1839)

Synonyms
- Amphioctopus areolatus (de Haan, 1839); Octopus areolatus de Haan, 1839; Octopus brocki Ortmann, 1888; Octopus fangsiao d'Orbigny, 1839; Octopus fangsiao etchuanus Sasaki, 1929; Octopus ocellatus Gray, 1849

= Amphioctopus fangsiao =

Species of octopus

Amphioctopus fangsiao, called webfoot octopus, is a species of octopus, a cephalopod belonging to the genus Amphioctopus. It is found in the Pacific Ocean, including off the coasts of New Zealand as well as in the Yellow Sea and surrounding shores. It is also commercially fished.

Individuals of A. fangsiao that share genetic similarities by region are distributed throughout the Yellow Sea by size. They can also be infected by parasites in genus Aggregata and Octopicola.

== Name ==
The Chinese name for this octopus is fanshao (飯蛸), meaning "rice octopus", because its eggs resemble grains of rice. The binomial name Amphioctopus fangsiao is derived from the Chinese name.

== Distribution ==
This species occurs in the Philippine Sea, the northwest Pacific and off the coast of Japan (Osaka Bay).

The lifespan of this species is approximately a year, typically spawning in the spring and growing linearly after spawning. In Haizhou Bay in the Yellow Sea, smaller individuals of A. fangsiao tend to be found closer to the shore in the spring and even closer during the summer, while larger individuals tend to be distributed further away from the shore.

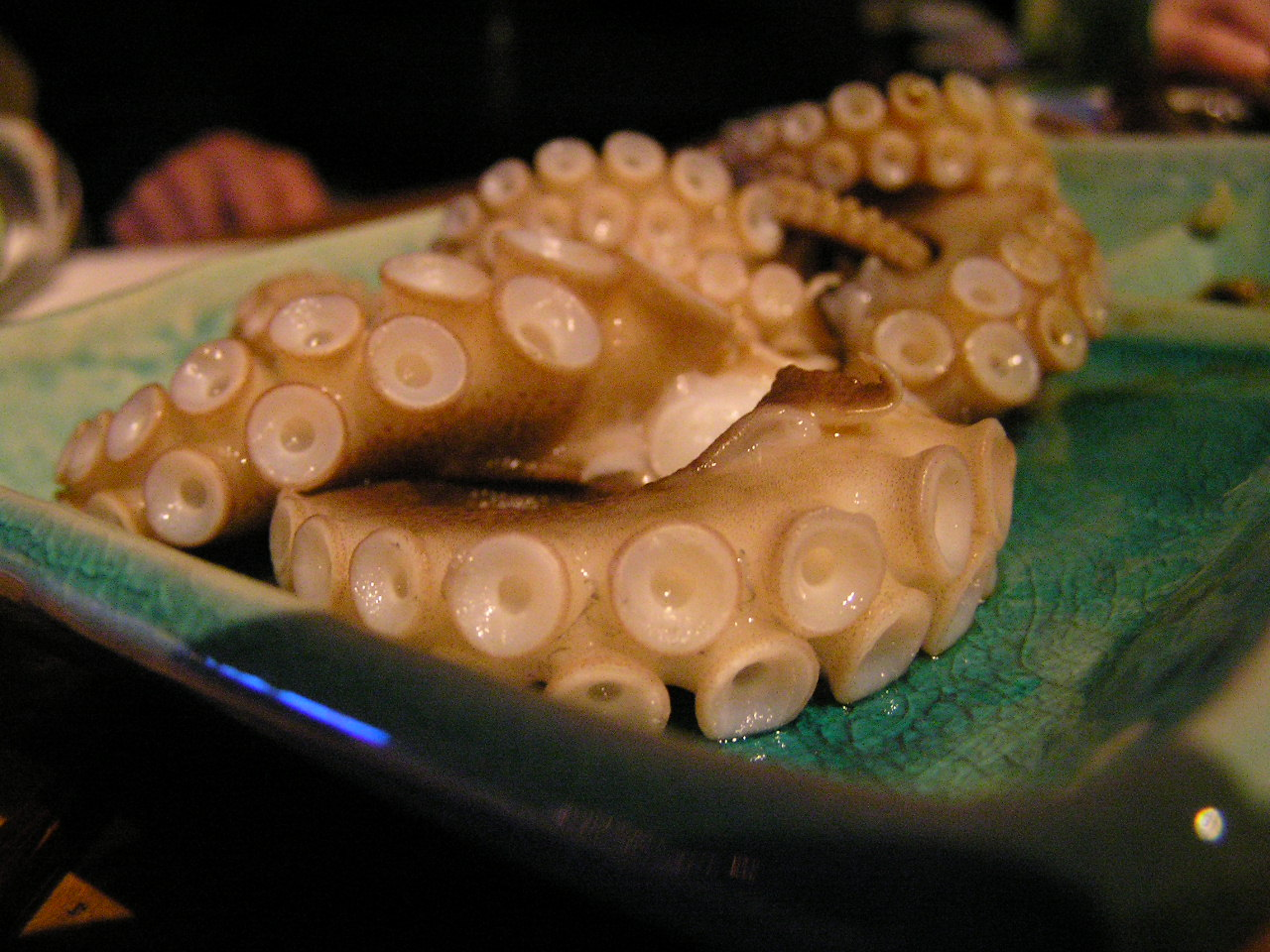
Closeup of suckers

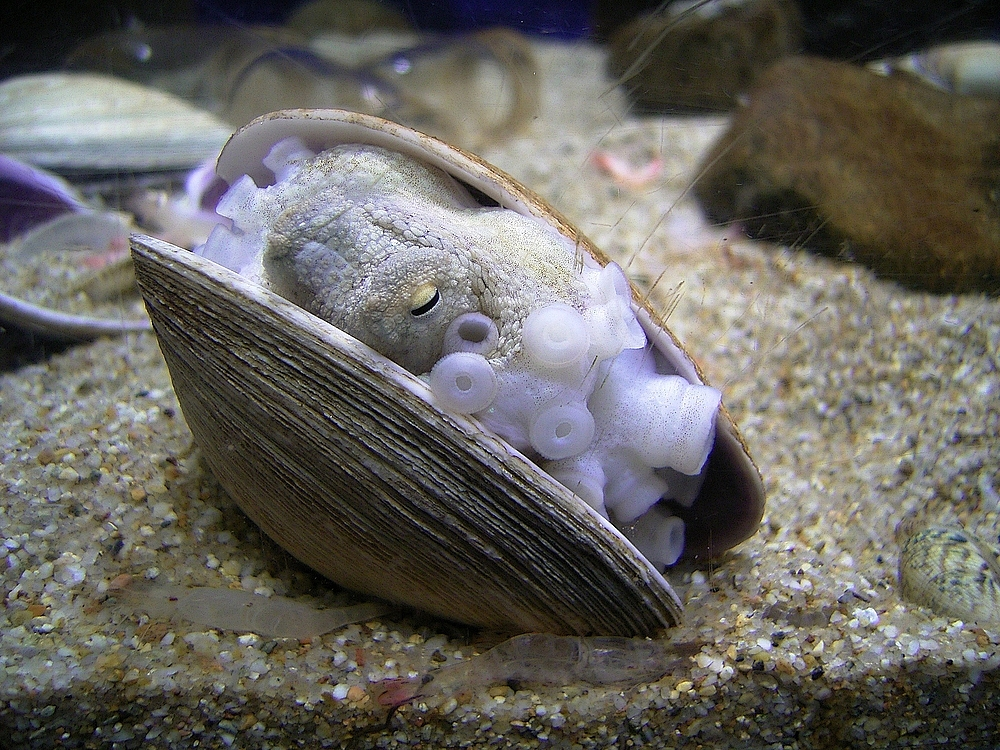
Hiding in shell

== Embryonic development ==
A. fangsiao holds an embryonic temperature threshold in which growth accelerates at 21–24 °C (70–75 °F). In three days after gestation the octopus is typically still gastrulating. On day 5, the embryo completes their first inversion and between days 15–21 after gestation, the octopus embryo exhibit chromatophores and black eyes. The embryos complete their second inversion between days 25–31. Octopus embryos develop logarithmically faster with increase in temperature; those embryos who develop at a temperature of 24 °C (75 °F) go through 0.83 embryonic stages per day on average while embryos that develop at a temperature between 18 and 21 °C (64 and 70 °F) go through 0.67 embryonic stages per day on average. The octopuses that had a smaller embryo but larger yolk volume tended to hatch at 24 °C (75 °F).

=== Abnormal morphologies ===
The embryos that grew at 27 °C (81 °F) were not able to hatch due to accelerated growth which caused eggs to be more swollen than eggs developing at lower temperatures; this accelerated growth caused the chorion to break and the embryo to hatch prematurely. While the eggs grown at 21 °C (70 °F) were ovular in shape as normal, the eggs grown at 24 °C (75 °F) were malformed. The embryos grown in 24 °C (75 °F) conditions also exhibited red eyes at 2 days after gestation.

== Diseases affecting A. fangsiao ==
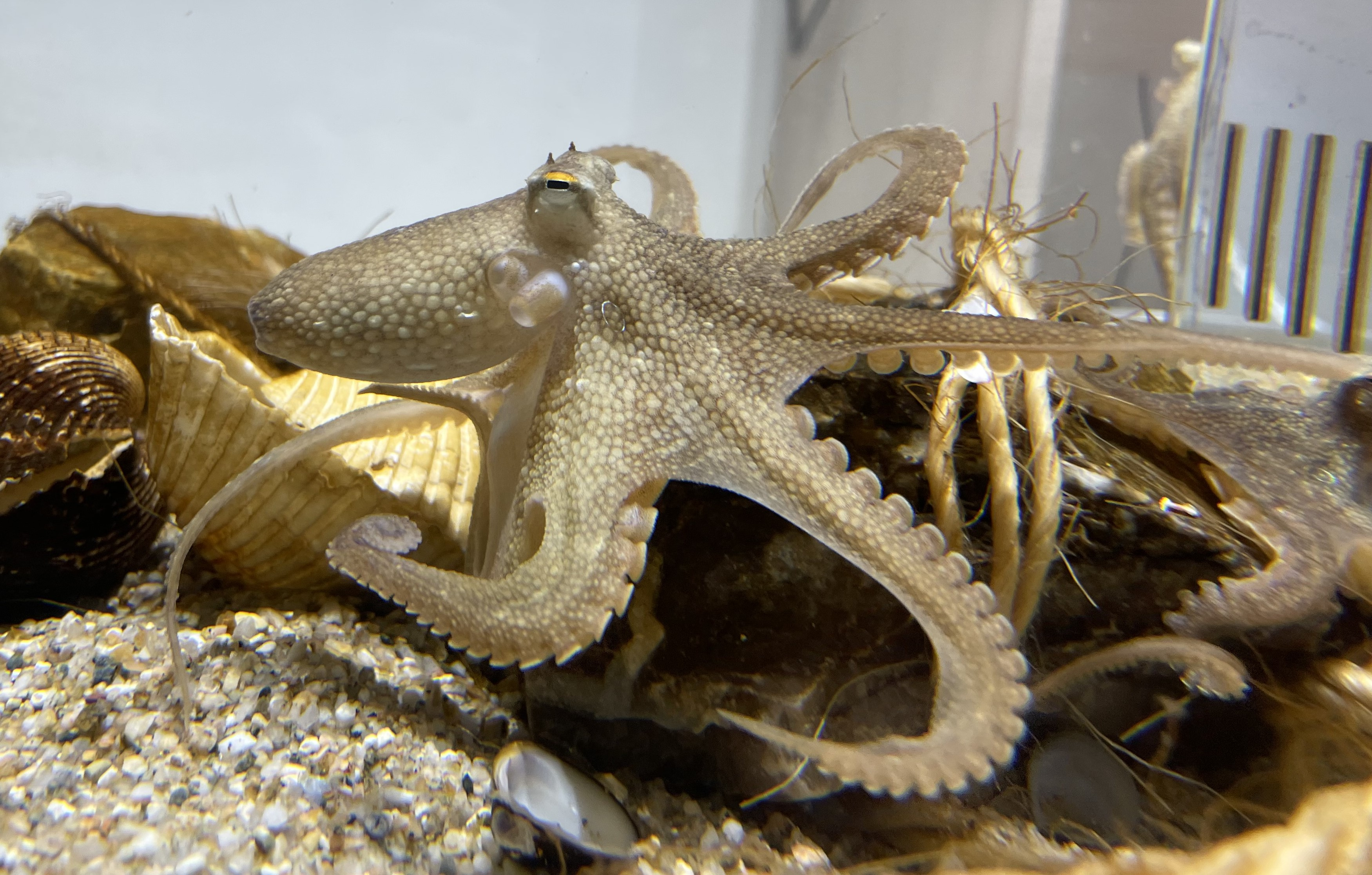
In NIFREL aquarium at Osaka, Japan

Like many other species of cephalopods, A. fangsiao is not safe from infection. As of 2021, there is not much information on the protozoan parasites that infect this species among other species of cephalopods native to the Pacific Ocean. It is known that is that these parasites belong to the genus Aggregata and are responsible for the infections that have led to the death of many A. fangsiao in a culture facility in China. Infection in A. fangsiao was also found from the genus Octopicola.

=== Aggregata infection ===
Evidence of the parasite's infection on the A. fangsiao specimens include numerous white cysts scattered throughout the body of each octopus. These cysts, called sporocysts, are smooth to the touch, measuring 17.69–20.72 μm by 15.97–20.00 μm. While the oocysts themselves are circular in shape measuring 249.75–501.75 μm and 116.84–350.87 μm in size. Oocysts represent one of the stages in their lifecycle. When histological surveys were done, the cysts had severely affected the integrity of the internal organs, and often the intestinal issue was greatly affected by oocysts filled with sporocysts. Out of the 220 octopuses collected at the site, 95 of them were infected with Aggregata—representing 43% of the investigated specimens in the facility.

=== Octopicola huanghaiensis infection ===
Recently discovered, the species Octopicola huanghaiensis is the first of its genus to infect A. fangsiao. However, its genus, Octopicola, is known to commonly infect octopuses.

=== Abnormalities within infection rates ===
Another experiment looked at the rate of infection of females versus males. The results were not as expected, 64% of the fatalities were female while the remaining 36% were males. The sample of the collected deceased A. fangsiao was 1,303; these data were collected between March 16 to April 2, 2017, in the Yellow Sea. These data showed that the death rate of females was higher than males during their breeding season. Upon further examination of the dead female specimens the researchers found that 16% had edema, 37% had broken skin, and 4% had broken arms.

== Genetic structure ==
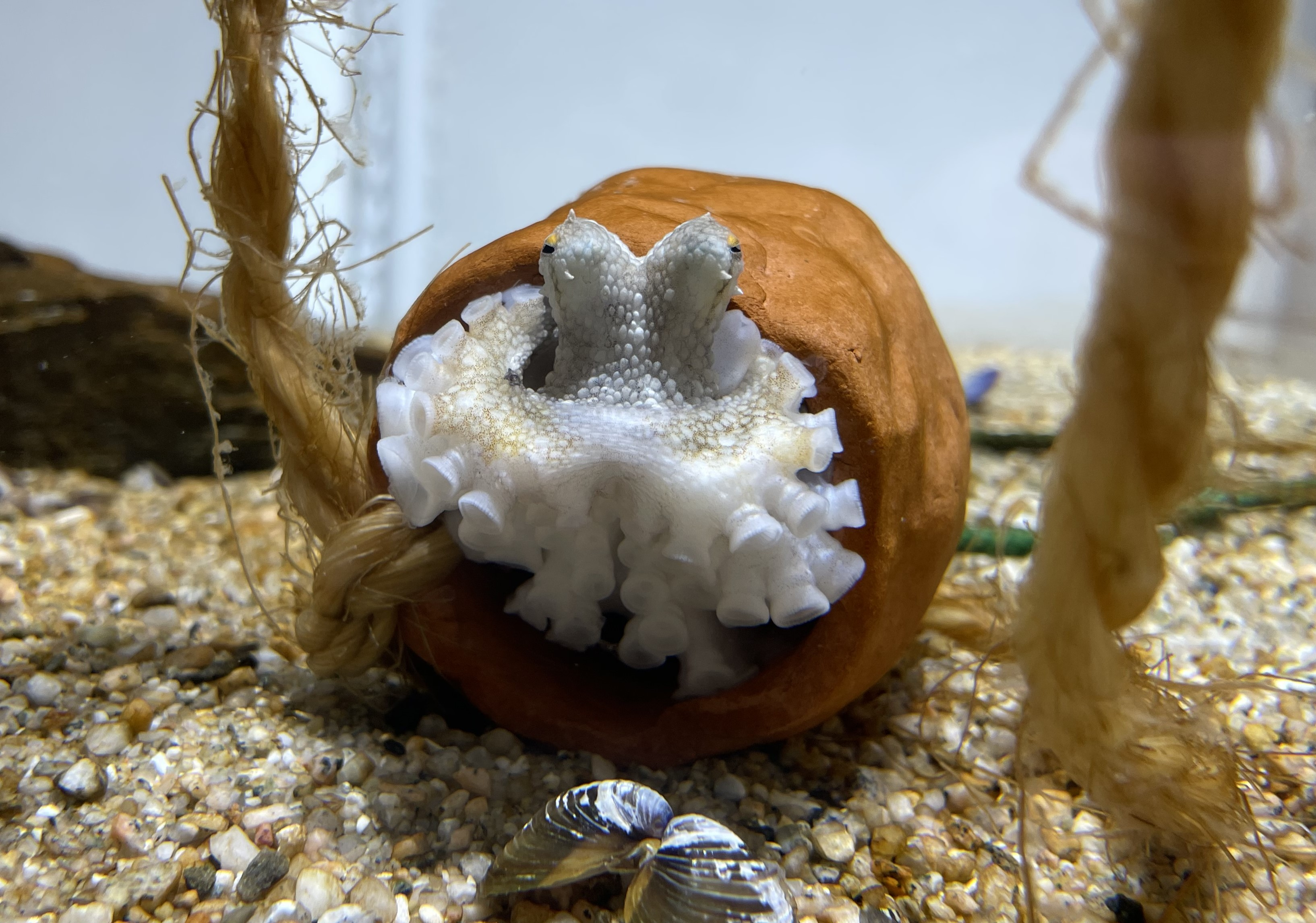

These octopuses are generally found along the shores of China, and are relatively highly genetic diverse in haplotype diversity, especially in the Zhanjiang province while the lowest haplotype diversity is seen in the Qingdao province. They also have low nucleotide diversity. There is more genetic variation among the population of A. fangsiao than there are within the population of A. fangsiao.

Two groups were defined by their genetic similarities and by region: A. fangsiao in the northern shore, including Dalian, Yantai, Qingdao, and Nantong provinces, were more similar among each other while the A. fangsiao in the southern shore, including Wenzhou, Xiamen, Dongshan, and Huizhou provinces, were more genetically similar each other. A haplotype network analysis showed that all the octopuses in the northern provinces shared a haplotype with each other using several mitochondrial gene markers (ATPase 6, ND2, and ND5), while the octopuses in the southern provinces shared different haplotypes with each gene marker; in all gene markers, the northern and southern province octopuses did not share any haplotypes with each other.

== Culinary use ==
In Korea, Amphioctopus fangsiao is called jukkumi (주꾸미) or jjukkumi (쭈꾸미) and is often stir-fried in spicy gochujang-based sauce.

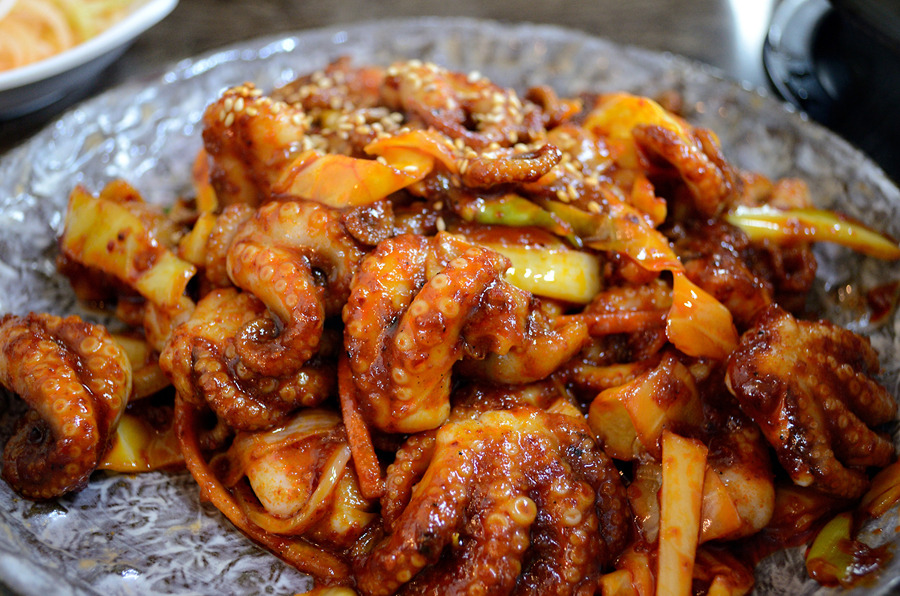
Jukkumi-bokkeum (stir-fried)

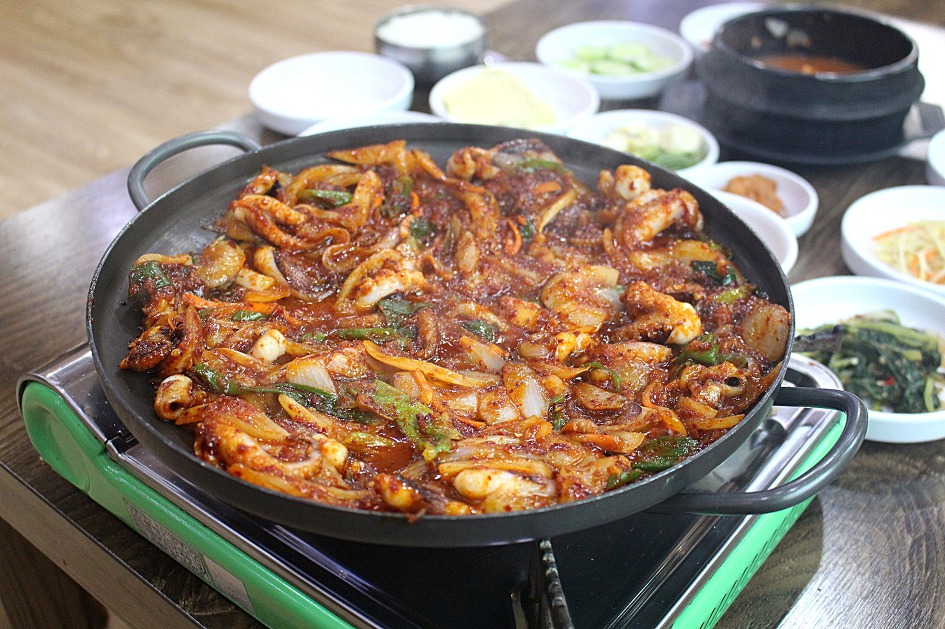
Jukkumi-bokkeum

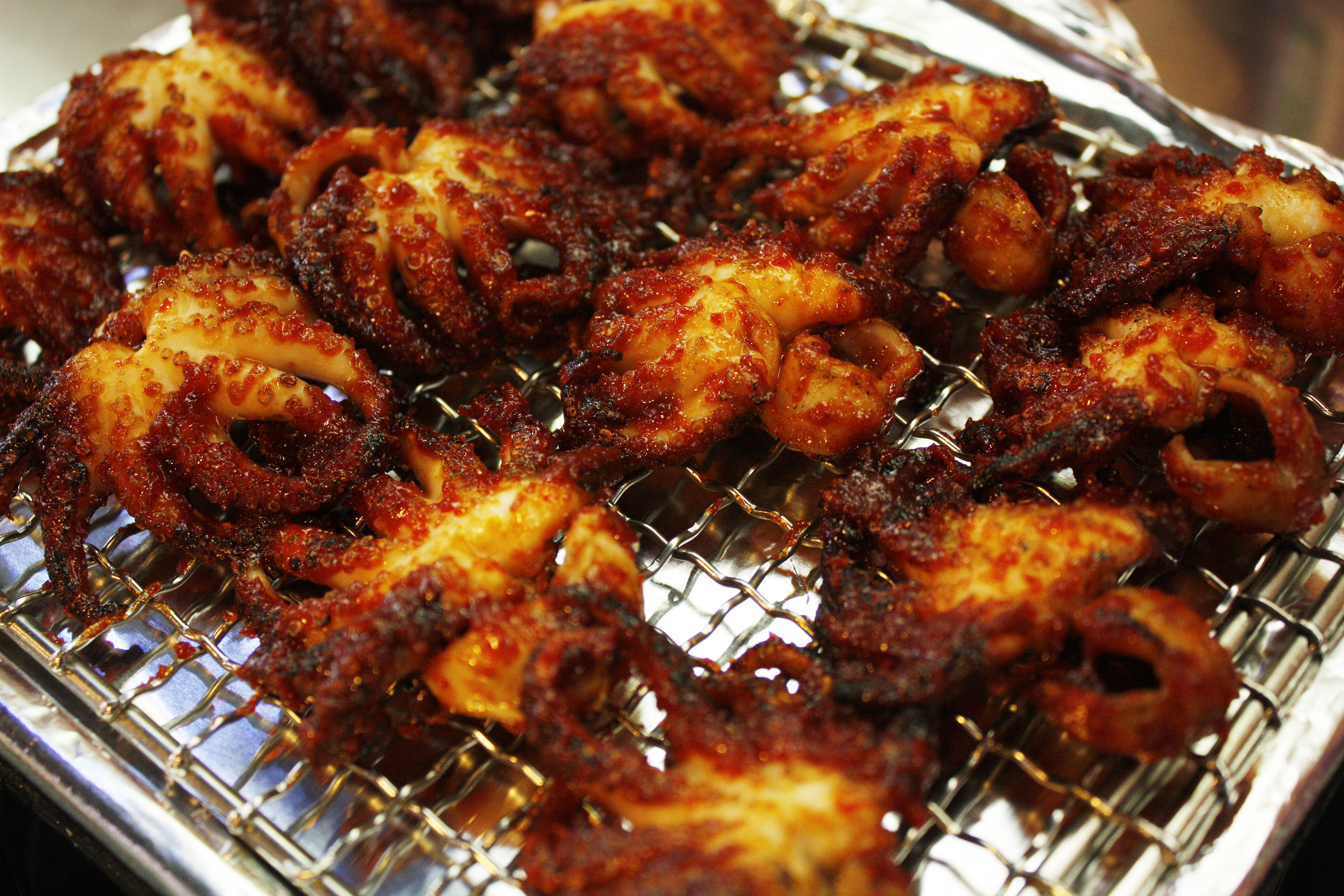
Jukkumi-gui (grilled)

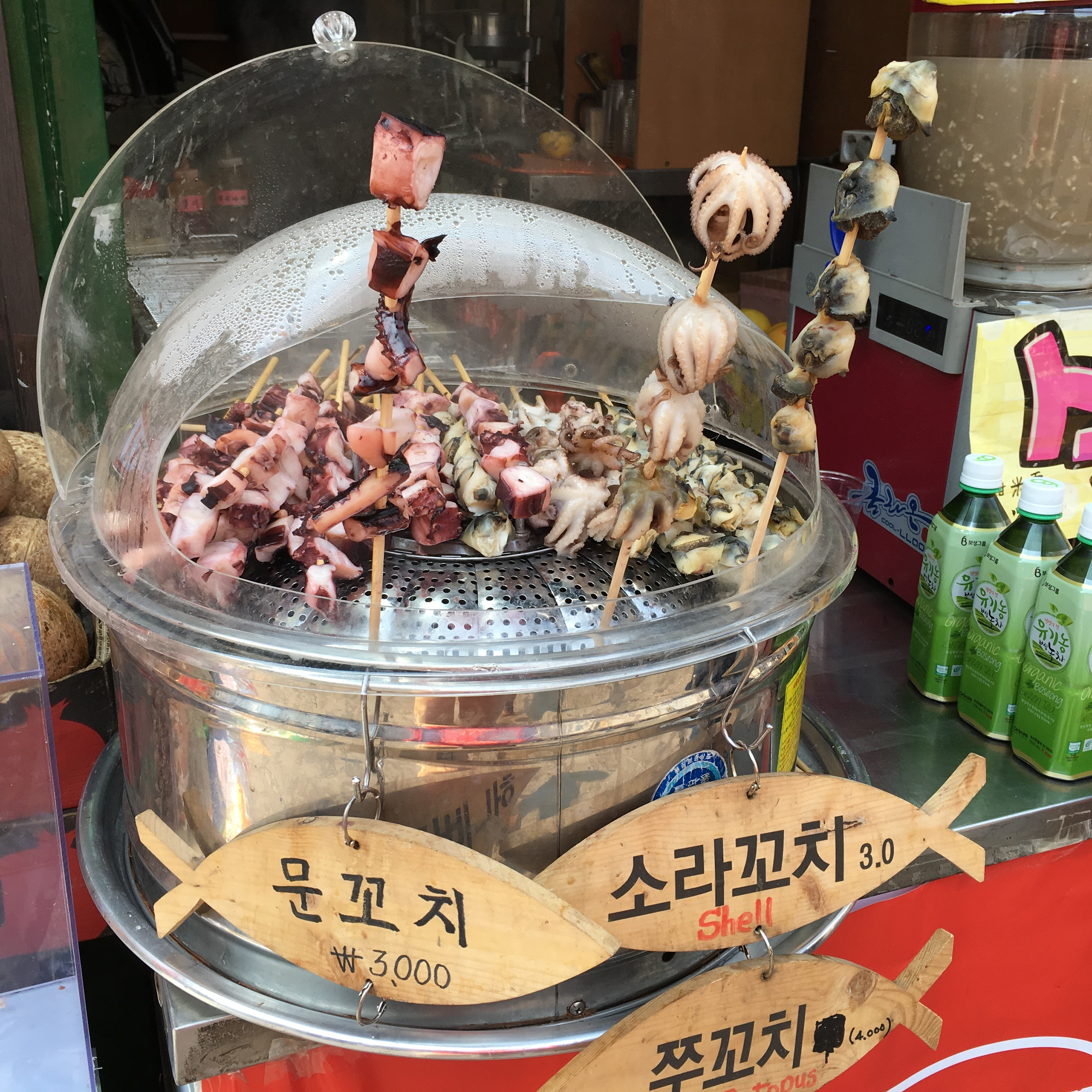
Seafood skewers sold in South Korea, including jju-kkochi (webfoot octopus skewers)
