= Amphioctopus neglectus =

Conservation status
- Least Concern (IUCN 3.1)

Scientific classification
- Kingdom: Animalia
- Phylum: Mollusca
- Class: Cephalopoda
- Order: Octopoda
- Family: Octopodidae
- Genus: Amphioctopus
- Species: A. neglectus

Binomial name
- Amphioctopus neglectus (Nateewathana & Norman, 1999)

Synonyms
- Octopus neglectus Nateewathana & Norman, 1999

Species of octopus

Amphioctopus neglectus, commonly known as the neglected ocellate octopus, is a species of octopus belonging to the genus Amphioctopus. Amphioctopus neglectus is native to the tropical Indo-Pacific region and was first described in 1999 after being discovered off the coast of Thailand. Males are known to reach 22 cm (8.7 in) in length, and females up to 24.6 cm (9.7 in).

== Distribution and habitat ==
Amphioctopus neglectus is found in benthic waters at a depth of up to 80 m (260 ft) in tropical waters in the Indo-Pacific. The species is distributed through the Andaman Sea, the Gulf of Thailand, and the coasts of Indochina, and has been found as far west as Kerala, India.
