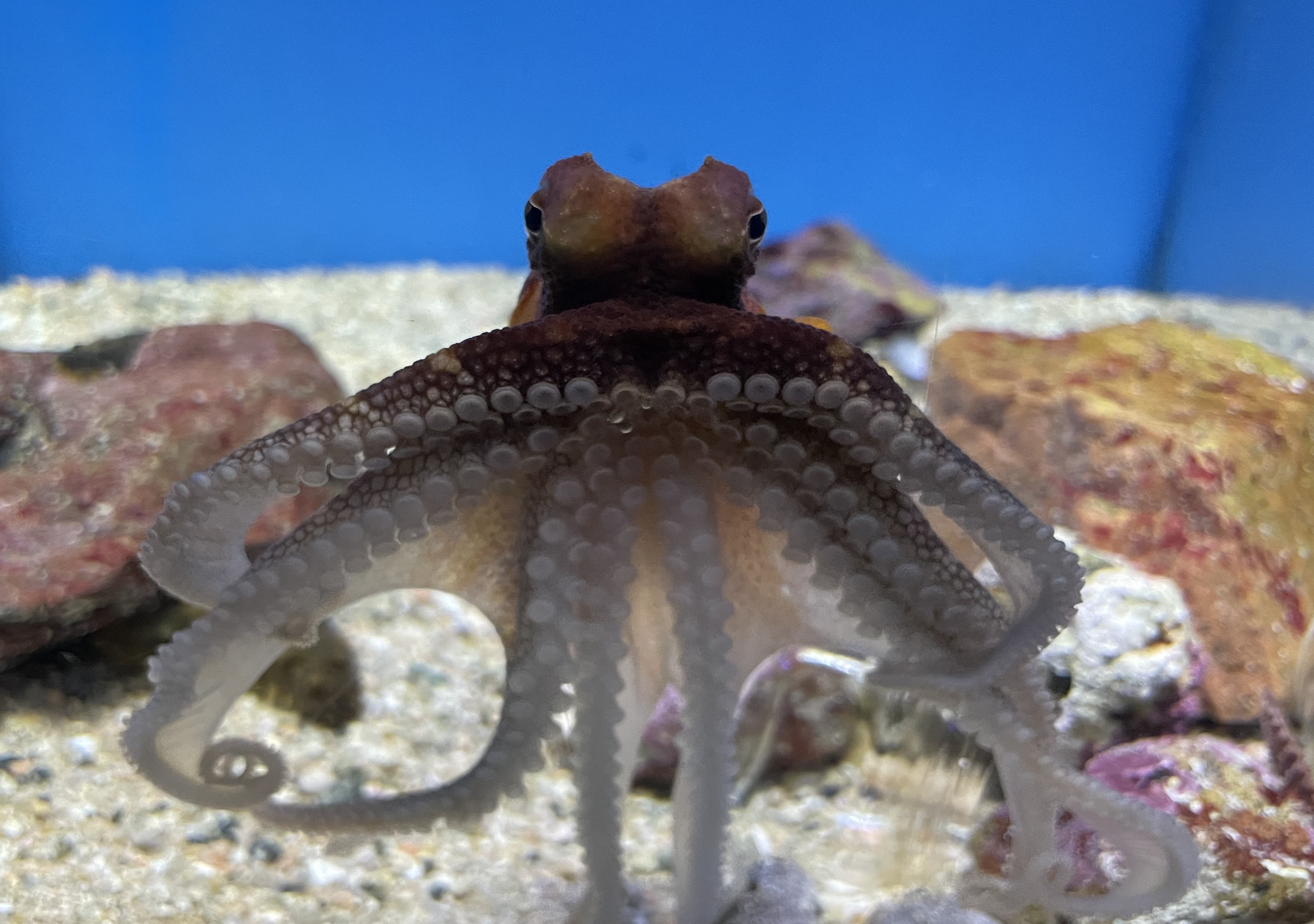

Conservation status
- Least Concern (IUCN 3.1)

Scientific classification
- Kingdom: Animalia
- Phylum: Mollusca
- Class: Cephalopoda
- Order: Octopoda
- Family: Octopodidae
- Genus: Amphioctopus
- Species: A. kagoshimensis

Binomial name
- Amphioctopus kagoshimensis (Ortmann, 1888)

Synonyms
- Octopus kagoshimensis Ortmann, 1888

= Amphioctopus kagoshimensis =

Species of octopus

Amphioctopus kagoshimensis, commonly known as the stareye octopus is a species of octopus in the genus Amphioctopus. It was first described in 1888, and is found in the Pacific Ocean from the southern coast of Japan to Taiwan. Amphioctopus kagoshimensis measures up to 30 cm (12 in) long, and has a mantle length of up to 8.6 cm (3.4 in).
