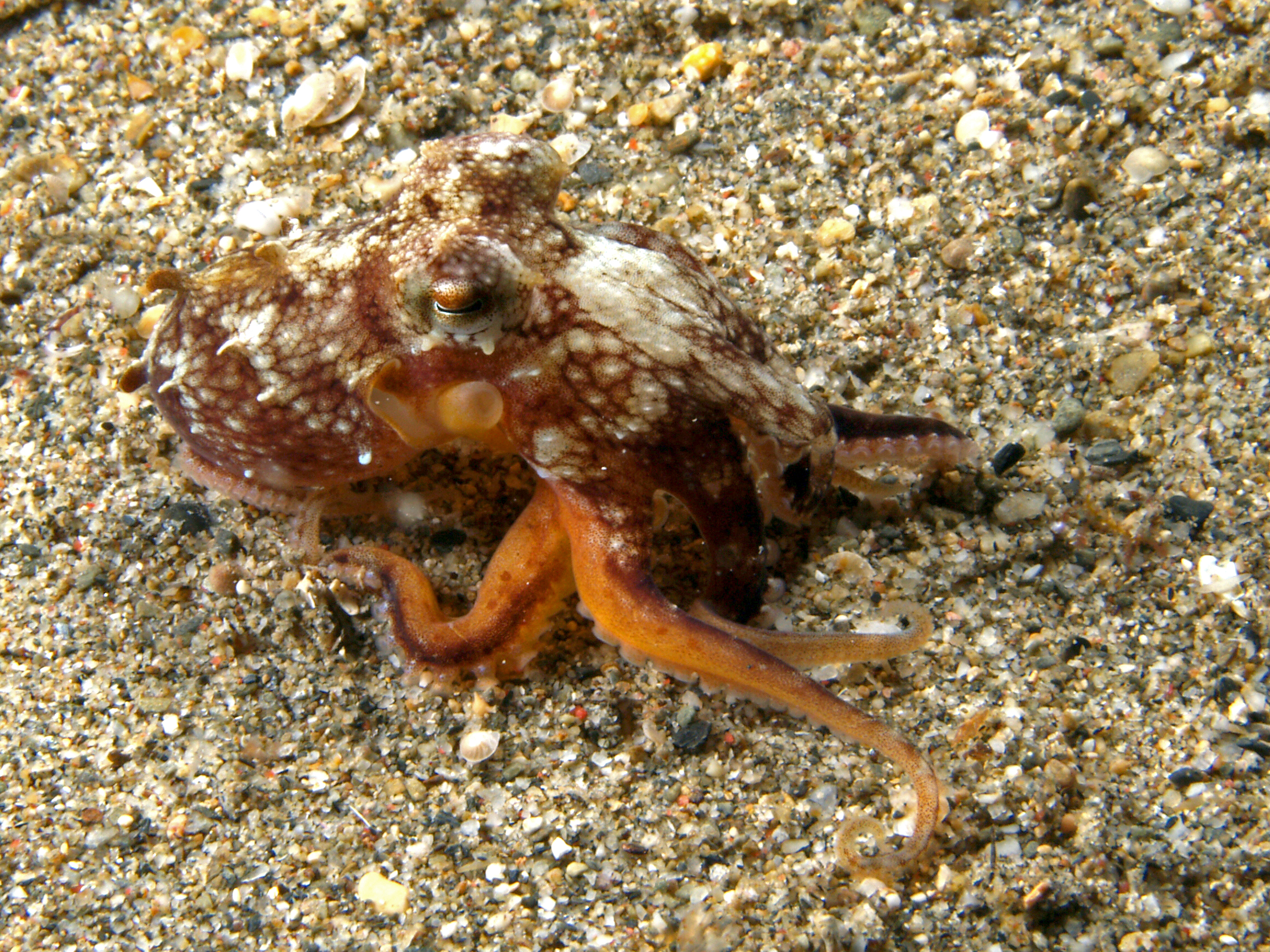
- Veined Octopus, Amphioctopus marginatus

Scientific classification
- Kingdom: Animalia
- Phylum: Mollusca
- Class: Cephalopoda
- Order: Octopoda
- Family: Octopodidae
- Genus: Amphioctopus; Fischer, 1882

Type species
- Octopus membranaceus Quoy & Gaimard, 1832

Species
- See text

Synonyms
- Schizoctopus Hoyle, 1886; “Sub-group of Octopus aegina” sensu Robson, 1929; “aegina species group” sensu Norman, 1993

= Amphioctopus =

Genus of molluscs

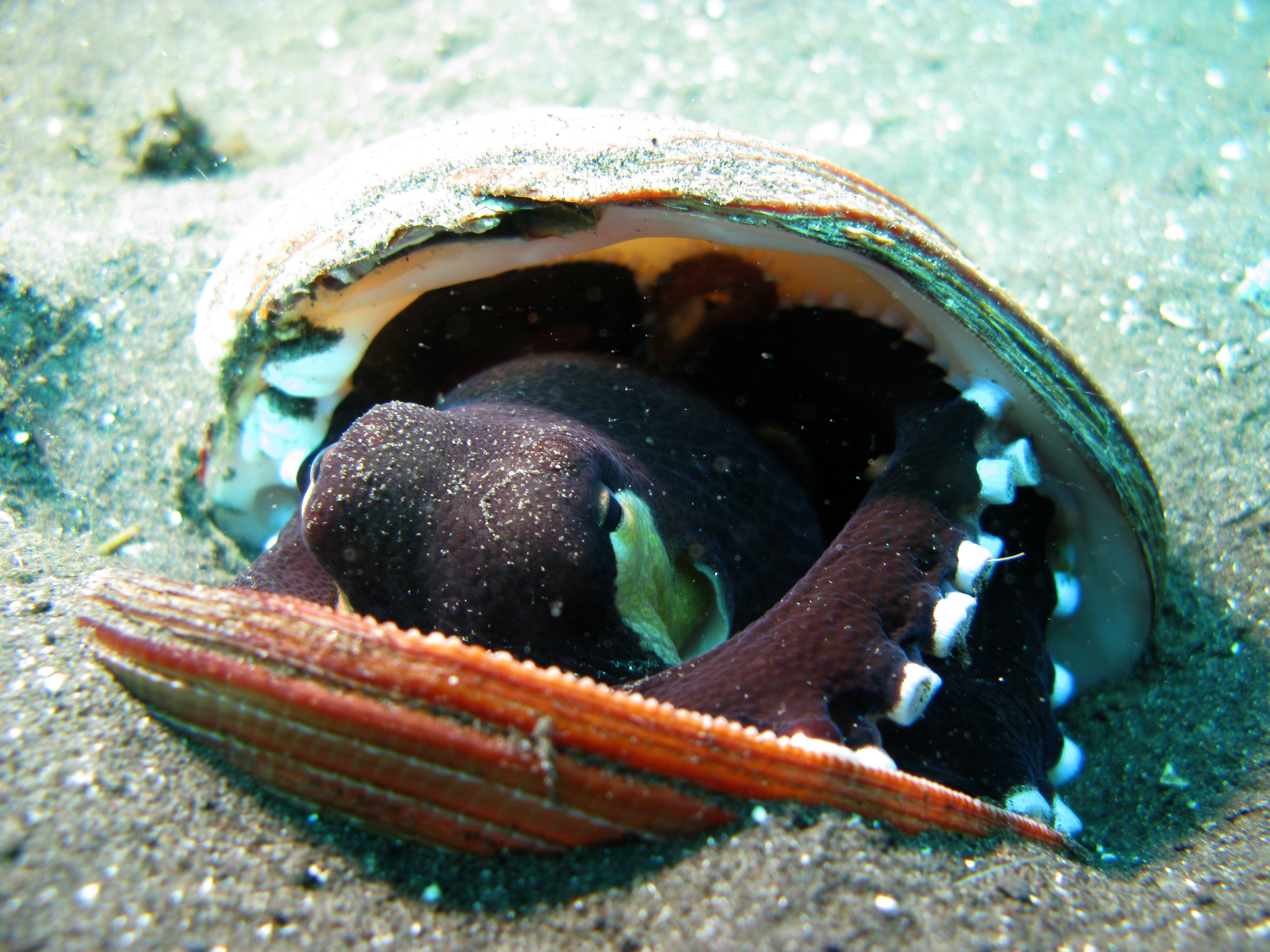
A. marginatus using two different bivalve shells for shelter

Amphioctopus is a genus of octopuses comprising around 18 species.

== Description ==
Members of the genus Amphioctopus reside in tropical and subtropical waters. These octopuses are found primarily in the Pacific and Indian Oceans but representatives can also be found in the Atlantic. They are characterized by arms that are about two or three times their mantle length with deep lateral webs and very shallow dorsal webs. This genus can be further divided into two subgroups, one group with ocellate octopuses, the other with non-ocellate octopuses.

== Taxonomic status ==
Historically, members of this genus were placed within the genus Octopus, but recognized as forming a distinct group and referred to as the Octopus aegina species complex. The genus was originally described by Fischer in 1882. He assigned to it the already described species, Octopus membranaceus (Quoy and Gaimard, 1832), as the type species (not to be confused with Enteroctopus membranaceus (Rochebrune and Mabille, 1889), the original types species of the genus Enteroctopus). Robson in his review of octopus taxonomy in 1929 regarded Amphioctopus membranaceus as a nomen dubium, referring it to his newly named "aegina species complex", a group of octopuses forming a distinct constellation characterized by Octopus aegina. The genus Amphioctopus was subsequently considered invalid. In 2002, Gleadall suggested that the aegina species group represents a distinct genus with Amphioctopus being the senior name. In 2004, Gleadall resurrected the genus Schizoctopus and assigned Octopus fangsiao as the type species. In 2005, Huffard and Hochberg, arguing that Robson's designation of Octopus membranaceus as a nomen dubium was premature and considering it a valid name, resurrected the genus name Amphioctopus for the Octopus aegina species complex. Huffard and Hochberg also found Schizoctopus to be a junior synonym for Amphioctopus.

== Species ==
As of August 31, 2025, this genus includes 18 species:

- Amphioctopus aegina
- Amphioctopus arenicola
- Amphioctopus burryi
- Amphioctopus carolinensis ^{(taxon inquirendum)}
- Amphioctopus exannulatus
- Amphioctopus fangsiao
- Amphioctopus granulatus ^{(taxon inquirendum)}
- Amphioctopus kagoshimensis
- Amphioctopus marginatus, veined octopus
- Amphioctopus membranaceus
- Amphioctopus mototi
- Amphioctopus neglectus
- Amphioctopus ovulum
- Amphioctopus polyzenia
- Amphioctopus rex
- Amphioctopus robsoni
- Amphioctopus siamensis
- Amphioctopus varunae

It appears to A. Pulcher to be a nomen dubium.
