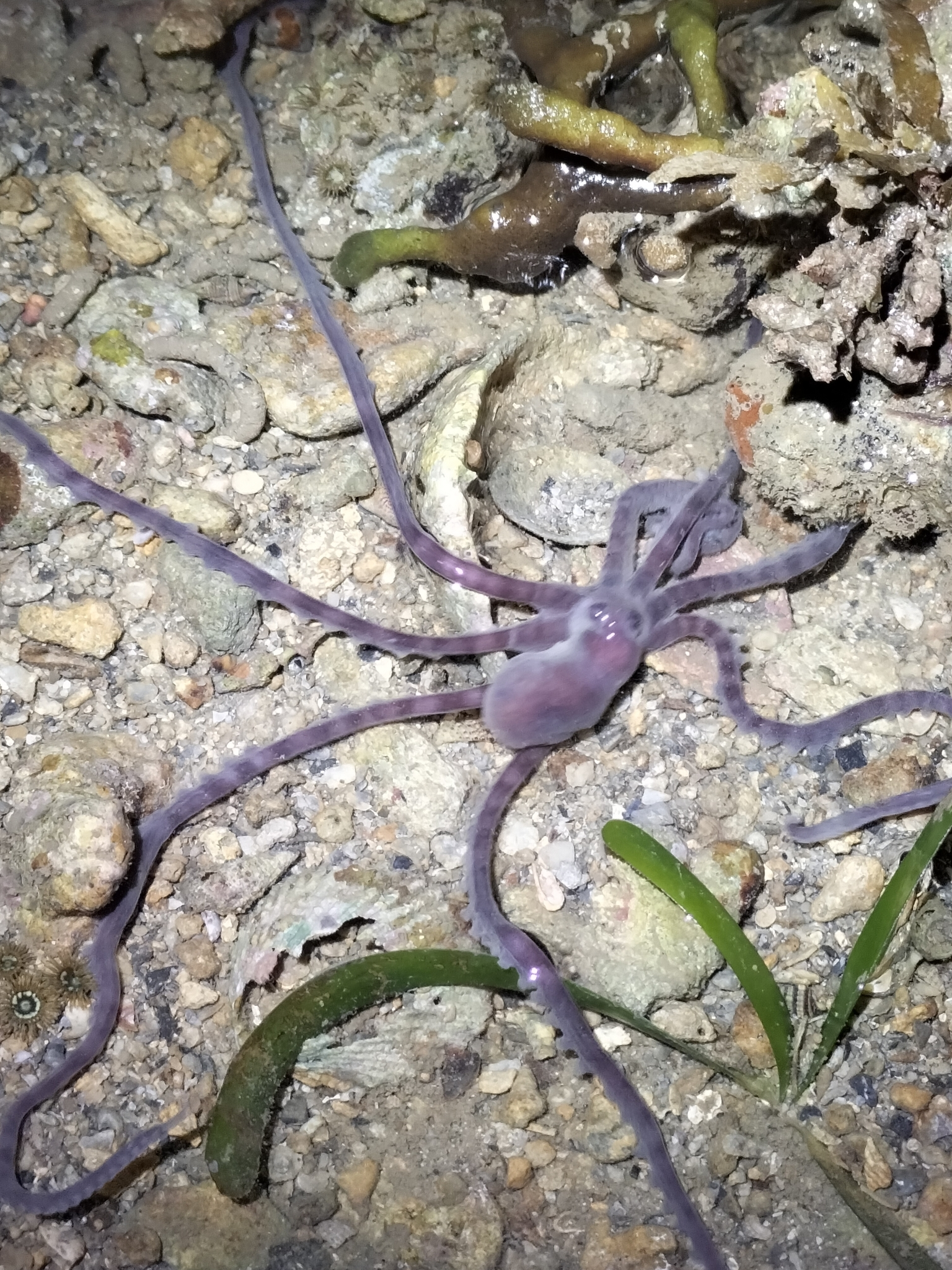
- A. litoralis

Conservation status
- Least Concern (IUCN 3.1)

Scientific classification
- Domain: Eukaryota
- Kingdom: Animalia
- Phylum: Mollusca
- Class: Cephalopoda
- Order: Octopoda
- Family: Octopodidae
- Genus: Ameloctopus; Norman, 1992
- Species: A. litoralis

Binomial name
- Ameloctopus litoralis Norman, 1992

= Ameloctopus =

Genus of molluscs

Ameloctopus litoralis is the only species of octopus in monotypic genus Ameloctopus. It is found in shallow waters in tropical Australia and lacks an ink sack. Ameloctopus litoralis lays large eggs compared to other octopuses.
