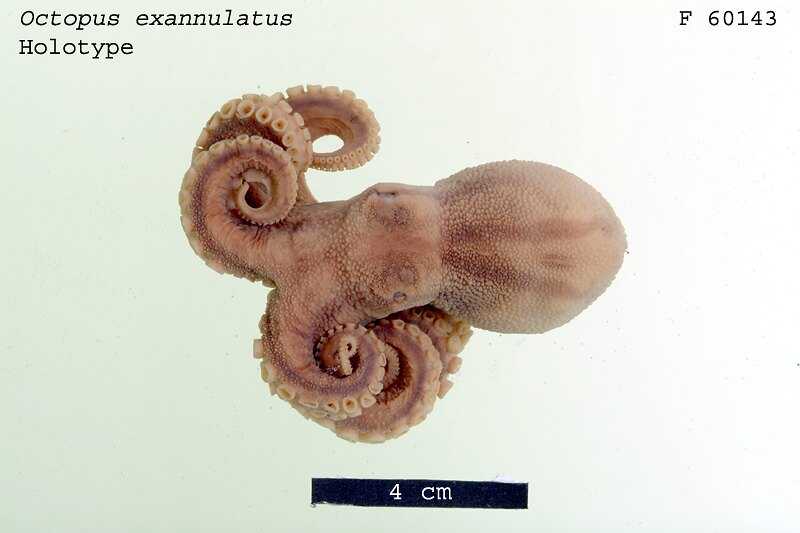

Conservation status
- Least Concern (IUCN 3.1)

Scientific classification
- Kingdom: Animalia
- Phylum: Mollusca
- Class: Cephalopoda
- Order: Octopoda
- Family: Octopodidae
- Genus: Amphioctopus
- Species: A. exannulatus

Binomial name
- Amphioctopus exannulatus (Norman, 1993)

Synonyms
- Octopus exannulatus Norman, 1993

= Amphioctopus exannulatus =

Species of octopus

Amphioctopus exannulatus, commonly known as the plain-spot octopus is a species of octopus in the genus Amphioctopus. Amphioctopus exannulatus is a small species of octopus, measuring up to 20 cm (7.9 in) in length with its mantle reaching 5 cm (2.0 in). A. exannulatus is found in the Pacific Ocean, with a range reaching from the Philippines to the north coast of Australia. It is sometimes caught as bycatch from prawn trawlers in the Great Barrier Reef, and may be used as bait.
