= Amphioctopus siamensis =

Conservation status
- Least Concern (IUCN 3.1)

Scientific classification
- Kingdom: Animalia
- Phylum: Mollusca
- Class: Cephalopoda
- Order: Octopoda
- Family: Octopodidae
- Genus: Amphioctopus
- Species: A. siamensis

Binomial name
- Amphioctopus siamensis (Nateewathana & Norman, 1999)

Synonyms
- Octopus siamensis Nateewathana & Norman, 1999

Species of octopus

Amphioctopus siamensis, commonly known as the Siamese ocellate octopus, is a species of octopus in the genus Amphioctopus. Amphioctopus siamensis was first described in 1999, and is found in the Andaman Sea and the Gulf of Thailand. A. siamensis measures up to 20 cm (7.9 in) long with a mantle length of up to 6.4 cm (2.5 in).
