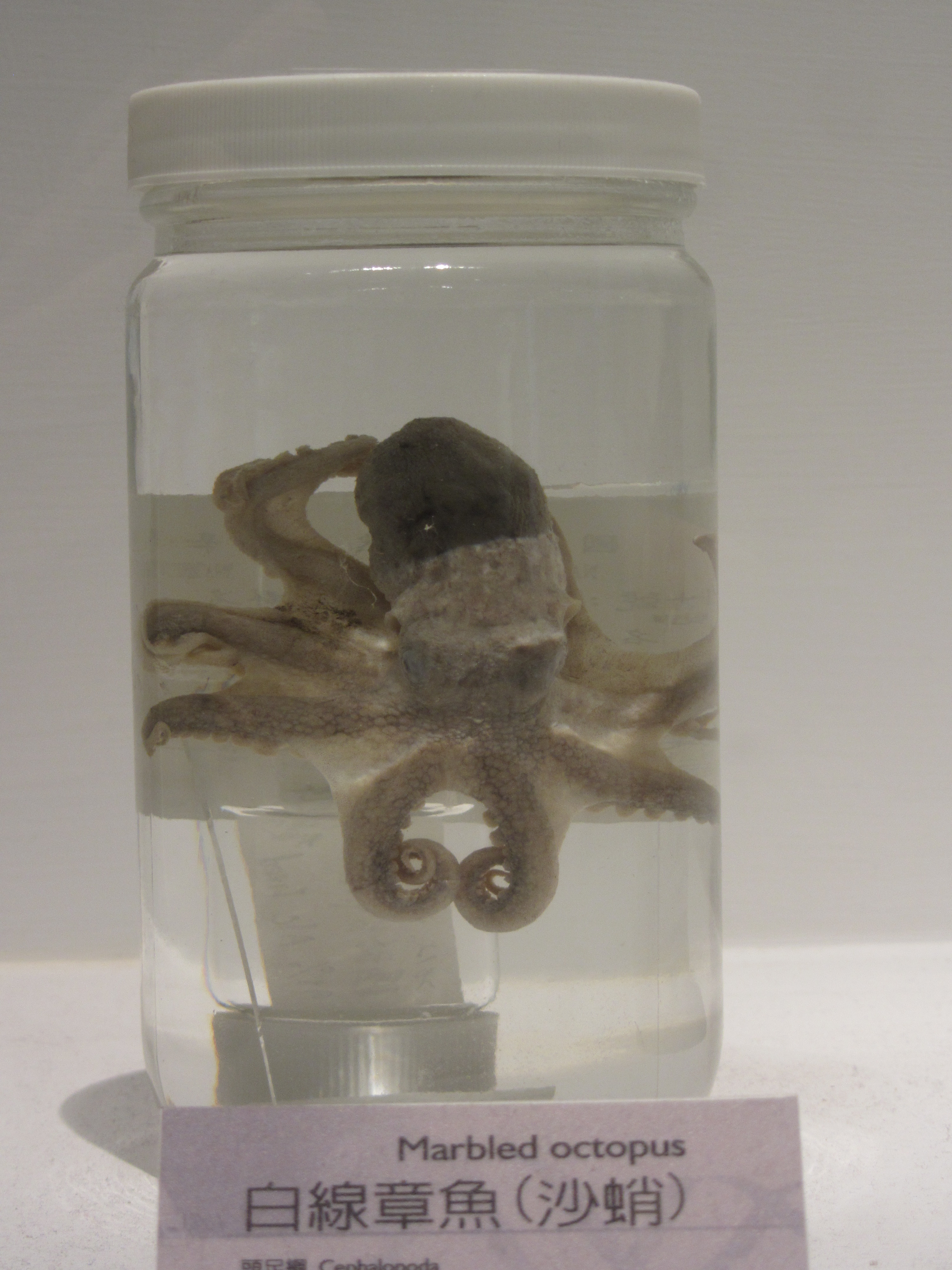

Conservation status
- Least Concern (IUCN 3.1)

Scientific classification
- Kingdom: Animalia
- Phylum: Mollusca
- Class: Cephalopoda
- Order: Octopoda
- Family: Octopodidae
- Genus: Amphioctopus
- Species: A. aegina

Binomial name
- Amphioctopus aegina (Gray, 1849)

= Amphioctopus aegina =

Species of mollusc

Amphioctopus aegina, commonly referred to as the marbled octopus or the sandbird octopus, is a bottom dwelling species residing in the coastal zone of the Indo-West Pacific. Planktonic hatchlings and eggs are laid by females predominantly during the months of January and October, however they have been known to reproduce year-round.

== Description ==
These cephalopods are moderately sized and have a mantle (visceral hump) approximately 4–10 centimetres (1.6–3.9 in) in length.They typically display a white stripe down the midline of the mantle, and another horizontal stripe between the eyes. Their arms are twice the length of their head with the lateral arms being the longest, and the males possess a hectocotylized third right arm. Each arm has two rows of suckers, and has the capability of regeneration in cases of loss or damage.

== Behavior ==
=== Diet ===
The sandbird octopus consumes a carnivorous diet of smaller fish species, shrimp, and crabs. They hunt in sub-tidal areas among soft substrates.

=== Reproduction ===
After spawning, the female sandbird octopus has been found to brood the egg cluster in her arm web. This is known as egg cradling, and is unique compared to most octopod species, as they typically attach their eggs to hard surfaces via strings. Egg spawning for the sandbird octopus however has only been closely observed in captivity for experimentation purposes, meaning it is possible that their preferred substrates were lacking, resulting in unnatural brooding habits. Eggs are laid year-round, though reproduction is at its peak during January and October. The mother octopus does not eat throughout the brooding process, and eventually passes away from starvation. The planktonic paralarvae first undergo a pelagic phase after hatching. After about a month, they migrate to muddy substrates in the sub-tidal zone.

== Distribution ==
Amphioctopus aegina is widely distributed. It is found throughout the Indian Ocean and the Northwest Pacific waters, stretching from China to India. It is bottom dwelling, and resides in muddy substrates within coastal waters.

== Human interaction and use ==
The sandbird octopus is a common victim of fishing industries. They are heavily caught along the gulf of Thailand and in Chinese coastal waters. Their high protein and low-fat content has made them a popular target for trawl fishing and trapping. Despite their popularity in regard to being a food source, very little is yet known about their basic biology and taxonomy, as they have yet to be extensively studied.

In southern Thailand, there is a local term for this kind of octopus known as wui (Thai: วุย), wai (Thai: วาย), or woi wai (Thai: โวยวาย). They are sometimes caught by traditional methods on the beach at low tide, using simple homemade poles baited with crab meat. When an octopus bites the bait, the fisher quickly thrusts the sharpened pole down to spear and capture it.
