= A. horridus =

A. horridus may refer to:

- Abdopus horridus, an octopus species in the genus Abdopus
- Acanthopholis horridus, an ankylosaurid dinosaur species that lived during the Early Cretaceous Period around 100 million years ago
- Acanthosicyos horridus, an unusual melon species found only in Namibia
- Argosarchus horridus, the New Zealand giant stick insect, a stick insect species endemic to New Zealand

== See also ==
- Horridus (disambiguation)
