= Abdopus capricornicus =

Conservation status
- Data Deficient (IUCN 3.1)

Scientific classification
- Kingdom: Animalia
- Phylum: Mollusca
- Class: Cephalopoda
- Order: Octopoda
- Family: Octopodidae
- Genus: Abdopus
- Species: A. capricornicus

Binomial name
- Abdopus capricornicus (Norman & Finn, 2001)

Synonyms
- Octopus capricornicus Norman & Finn, 2001

Species of octopus

Abdopus capricornicus is a species of octopus in the family Octopodidae, and is often also referred to as Octopus capricornicus. This octopus is native to the Great Barrier Reef and is often found throughout the Indo-West Pacific Ocean. There are six other species of octopuses within the subgenus Abdopus with a large number of organisms not yet described. This octopus is notable for its unique body patterning through which it can change. The likely uses for this characteristic are camouflage or intraspecific communication. Other organisms in the Abdopus genus include A. horridus, A. abaculus, A. aculeatus, and A. tonganus. Individuals are capable of autotomy, sacrificing a writhing arm to a predator to distract it while making an escape.

== Description ==
The Abdopus capricornicus is known for having mottled skin with their most distinguishable features being white rings going down their arms and small ringed white spots scattered around their body. This octopus also has white spots along the dorsal mantle of its body. These white spots are characteristic as their shape is crescent-like. "Abdopus" refers to small octopuses with long arms. These octopuses are known to have less than 130 enlarged suckers running down their arms. These octopuses can vary in color from light gray/brown to dark brown. Abdopus capricornicus change their patterning in order to camouflage in varying circumstances, whether intraspecific or interspecific interactions.

== Habitat ==
Abdopus capricornicus is primarily found in intertidal reef flats located on or near The Great Barrier Reef and around the Indo-West Pacific Ocean. This species, like many classified within this genus, reside mostly on the seafloor.

== Anatomy ==
When compared with similar species, A. capricornicus has a higher degree of folding on the surface of its optic lobe. This is suggested to be a result of tropical environments and their accompanying complexities. Their optic lobes are also considered to be crescent-shaped, and this morphological feature becomes more noticeable as these octopuses grow from juveniles into adults. This increased distinguishable shape of the optic lobe is likely due to the change from planktonic to benthic life as they grow and develop. Where many other currently studied octopus species have only five gyri, the A. capricornicus has seven which suggests that these organisms are more behaviorally complex.

== Ecological Interactions ==
=== Predator/Prey Interactions ===
Octopuses have many different adaptations in order to protect themselves from predators, and many octopuses utilize similar strategies. Some employ camouflage through which they use chromatophores to change their color. Many octopuses use a projection of ink in order to startle and distract predators. And it is common that octopuses will swim and use jet-propulsion to escape predators quickly. Additionally, the ability to squeeze into places predators may not be able to fit and/or reach allows individuals to hide. A unique predatory evasion tactic that A. capricornicus possess is the ability to autotomize their arms, acting as a distraction to the predators, drawing attention away and allowing the octopus to escape.

=== Reproductive Interactions ===
Octopus mating occurs through the use of the hectocotylus. The hectocotylus is a male body part which is inserted into the mantle of a female octopus. The hectocotylus then releases spermatophores into the oviducts. Eggs are fertilized upon exiting the oviducts. Female octopuses generally lay their eggs in shallow water and stays with the egg mass in order to protect it.

In the species A. aculeatus which is closely related to A. capricornicus, female octopuses rarely reject the mating advances of the male octopus. It was also seen that males of this species exhibit pre-copulatory mate preferences in which they tend to choose the larger females to mate with. These octopuses also exhibit mate guarding and sneaker mating, in which a male octopus sneaks up on a female in order to impregnate them.

A. capricornicus has been known to display many different patterns and colors while mating. A pattern that is displayed strictly during social interactions is horizontal black stripes with a pale background. The male octopuses often display light brown coloring when approaching females to mate. Female octopuses change their patterning when defying a mate as well.
