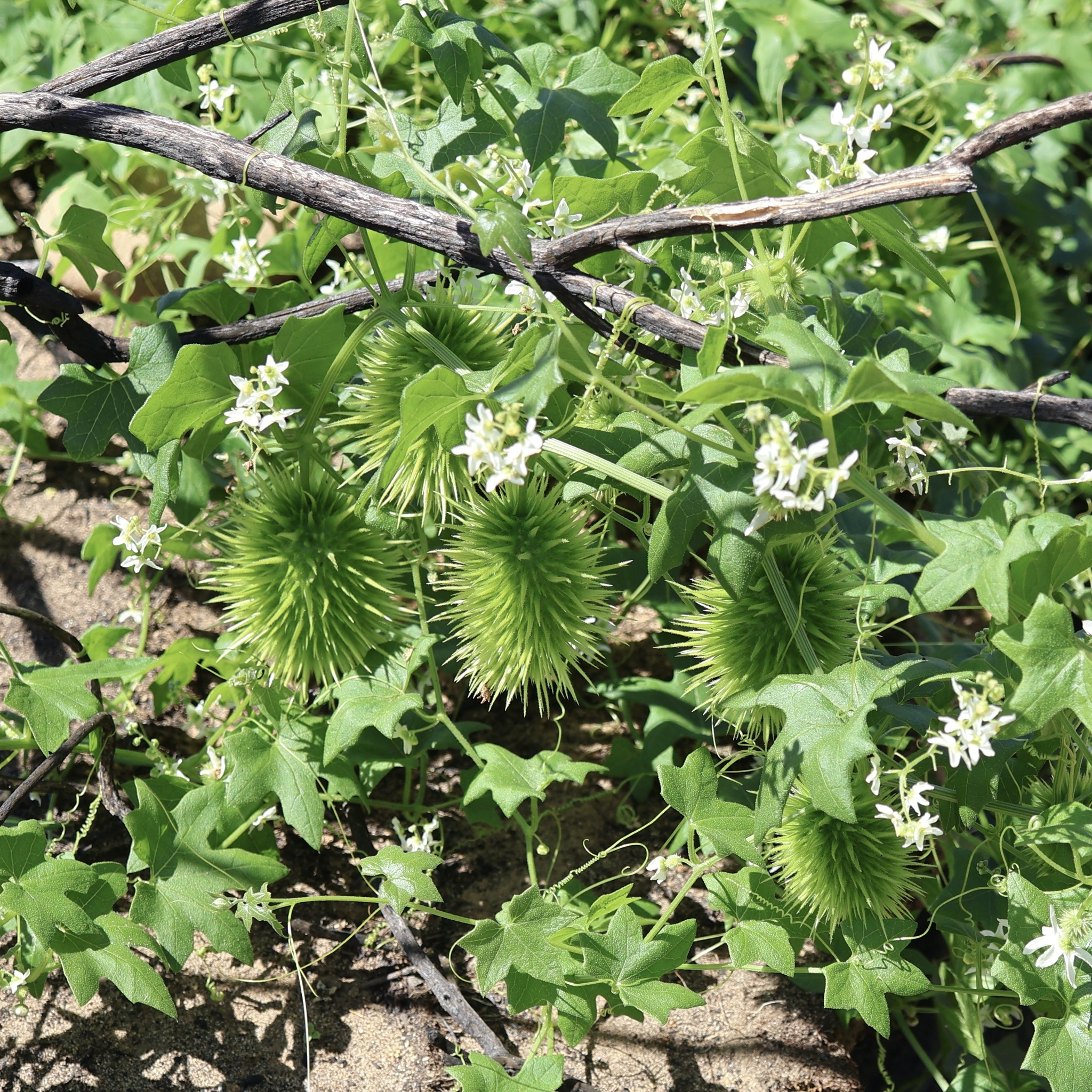

Scientific classification
- Kingdom: Plantae
- Clade: Tracheophytes
- Clade: Angiosperms
- Clade: Eudicots
- Clade: Rosids
- Order: Cucurbitales
- Family: Cucurbitaceae
- Genus: Marah
- Species: M. macrocarpa

Binomial name
- Marah macrocarpa (Greene) Greene

Synonyms
- List: Marah macrocarpus (orthographic variant); Echinocystis macrocarpaGreene; Marah leptocarpa (Greene) Greene; Megarrhiza californica S.Watson; Megarrhiza macrocarpa (Greene) Tidestr.; Micrampelis leptocarpa(Greene) Greene; Micrampelis macrocarpa (Greene) Greene

= Marah macrocarpa =

Chilicothe

Species of flowering plant

Marah macrocarpa is a species of plant in the genus Marah commonly referred to as chilicothe, wild cucumber, manroot or bigroot. It is a perennial herb with a large tuber native to Southern California and northern Baja California. It grows in a diverse number of habitats in coastal and inland regions. A member of the gourd family, it produces a large, green, prickly fruit. Indigenous peoples traditionally used it for treating hair loss and pain relief. All parts of the plant are toxic, as it contains cucurbitacins and ribosome-inactivating proteins.

== Description ==
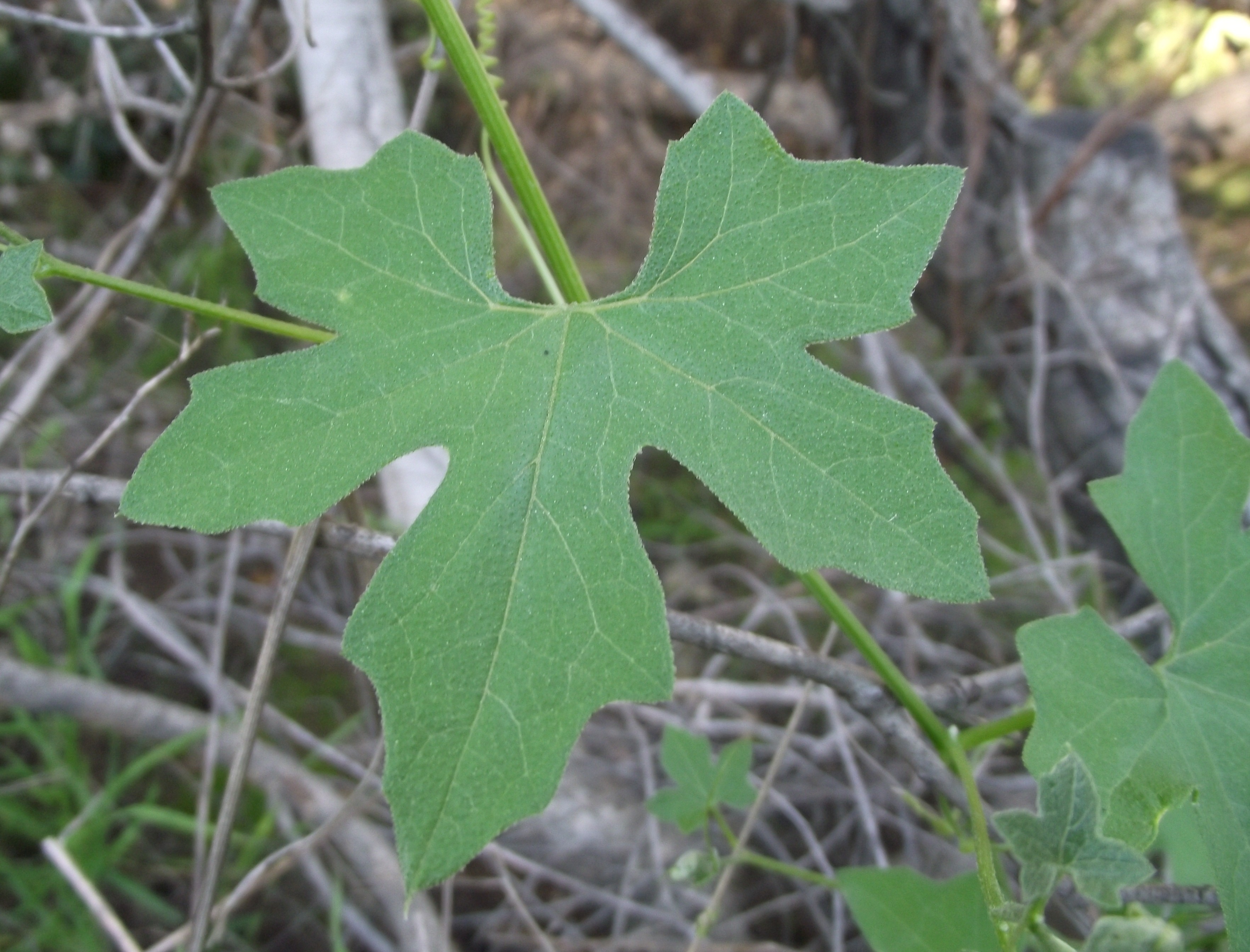
Marah macrocarpa leaf

Marah macrocarpa has the most pubescent shoots, stems, and leaves of all the Marah species native to California - this being consistent with its range having the most xeric climate. Vines appear in late winter in response to increased rainfall, and can climb or scramble to a length of 6 metres (20 ft). The subspecies M. m. major of the Channel Islands (California) is about twice as large in all of its parts. For example, the mainland leaves are 5 to 10 centimeters wide while the insular leaves are 15 to 25 centimeters in width. And the seeds on the mainland are 15 to 20 millimeters long while the insular seeds are 28 to 33 millimeters in length.

Vines emerge from a large, hard tuberous root which can reach several meters in length and weigh in excess of 100 kilograms (220 lb). Weights of up to 500 pounds (227 kilograms) have been reported. Vines develop leaves and, particularly, flowers and fruit very quickly, often with the first nodes of the quick-growing vines containing male and female flower heads. Its leaves typically have five lobes with individual plants showing wide variation in leaf size and lobe length.

Flower

The flower can vary in color from yellowish green to cream to white. Flowers appear soon after the vine emerges. The flowers are monoecious, that is, individual flowers are either male or female, but both sexes can be found on the same plant. Male flowers appear in open clusters while female flowers, distinguished by a swollen base, usually appear individually. The plant is self-fertile, i.e. pollen from the male flowers can fertilise the female flowers on the same plant; pollination is by insects.

Fruit

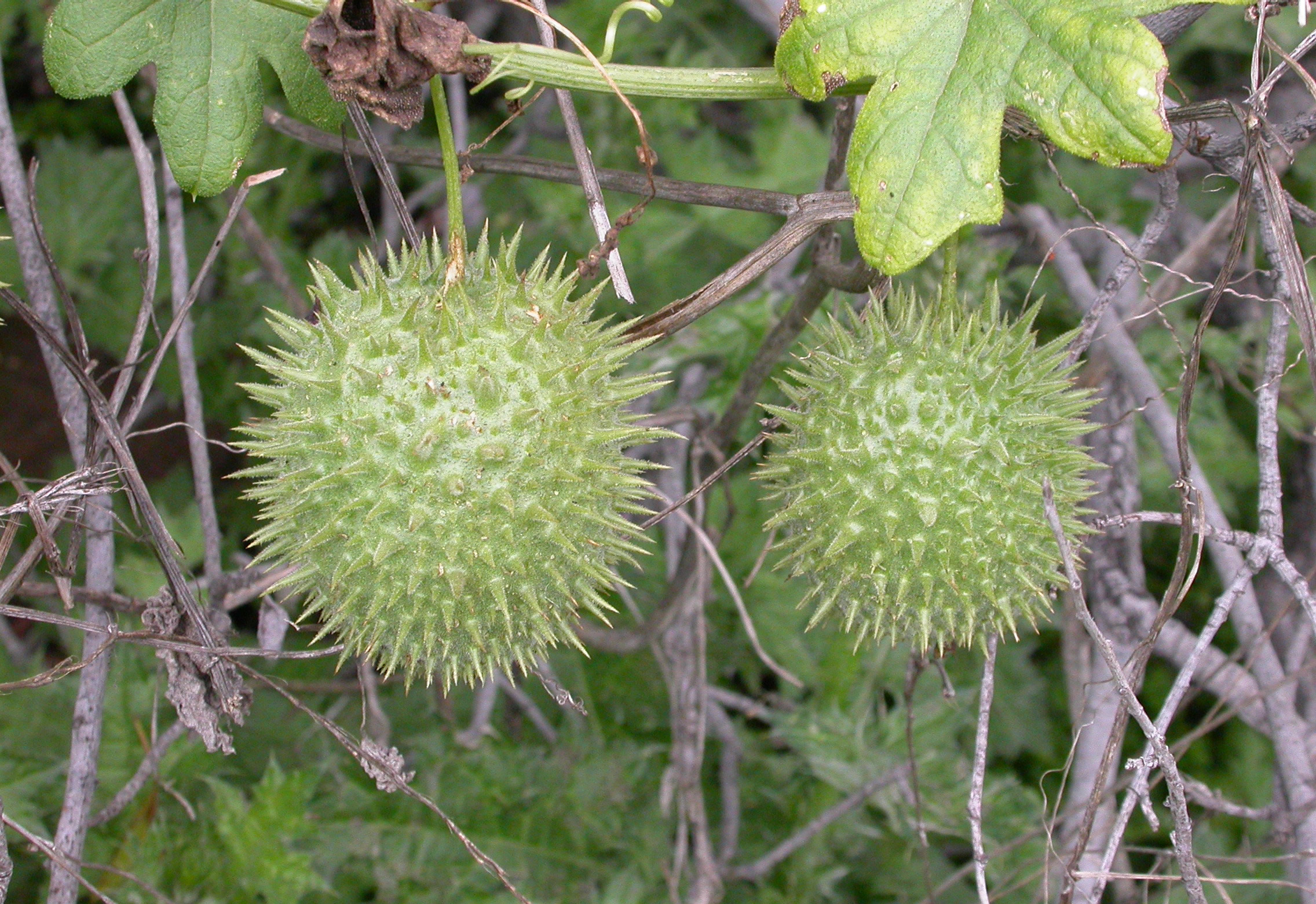
Marah macrocarpa fruit

The fruit is longer than it is wide, 5–6 cm in diameter and 15–20 cm long, and covered in prickles of variable density, up to 1 cm long but without hooks. Unripe fruit are bright green, ripening to yellow. The fruit swells as it ripens until finally rupturing and releasing the large seeds. Fruit begin to form in late winter and ripen by early summer.

Seeds and germination

Seeds of Marah macrocarpa are large, hard, and very smooth. Southern California manroot has larger, longer seeds than the other manroot species except for Marah horridus. Fruits usually hold four or more seeds. Seeds sprout in the cool wetness of late winter. Seeds have an intriguing germination process. The initial shoot emerges from the seed and grows downward into the earth. This shoot then splits, one part beginning to swell and form the tuber, while the second part grows back to the surface and becomes the vine.

== Taxonomy ==
Varieties for this species are sometimes recognized, depending on the authority. Kenneth Morgan Stocking circumscribed these varieties based on the sizes of the staminate flowers and seeds. The other dimensions of the plants follow these sizes in proportion.

- Marah macrocarpa var. macrocarpa — The autonymic name. Staminate flowers 8–13 mm (0.31–0.51 in) in diameter and seeds 15–20 mm (0.59–0.79 in) long.
- Marah macrocarpa var. major (Dunn) Stocking — A combination based on Marah major, a species described by Dunn. A larger variety endemic to the Channel Islands of Southern California. Staminate flowers 14–30 mm (0.55–1.18 in) in diameter and seeds 28–33 mm (1.1–1.3 in) long.
- Marah macrocarpa var. micrantha (Dunn) Stocking — A combination based on Marah micranthus (Dunn). Commonly known as the Cedros manroot. This very rare variety is endemic to Cedros Island in Baja California. Staminate flowers 3–6 mm (0.12–0.24 in) in diameter and seeds 10–13 mm (0.39–0.51 in) long.

=== Guadalupe manroot ===
Marah guadalupensis (S. Watson) Greene, the Guadalupe manroot is a species endemic to Guadalupe Island in the Pacific Ocean. It is distinguished from other species of Marah by its large campanulate corollas, two-seeded fruit, and its longer, linear, pistillate sepals. M. guadalupensis is subject to different taxonomic treatments depending on the authority. Some authorities recognize it as a distinct species, while others recognize it as conspecific with M. macrocarpa. Other authorities expand M. guadalupensis to include the Channel Islands manroot, M. macrocarpa var. major (or M. major). Stocking noted similarities of M. guadalupensis in its flowers and fruit to Marah oreganus and suggested a close relationship.

== Distribution and habitat ==
Marah macrocarpa is native to Southern California in the United States and Baja California, Mexico. Its range extends from the Transverse Ranges and Channel Islands through the Peninsular Ranges, and the Sonoran Desert. M. macrocarpa is bounded to the north by the Santa Clara River, which also forms the southern boundary for Marah fabacea. It occurs throughout Baja California and its adjacent Pacific islands, including Cedros Island.

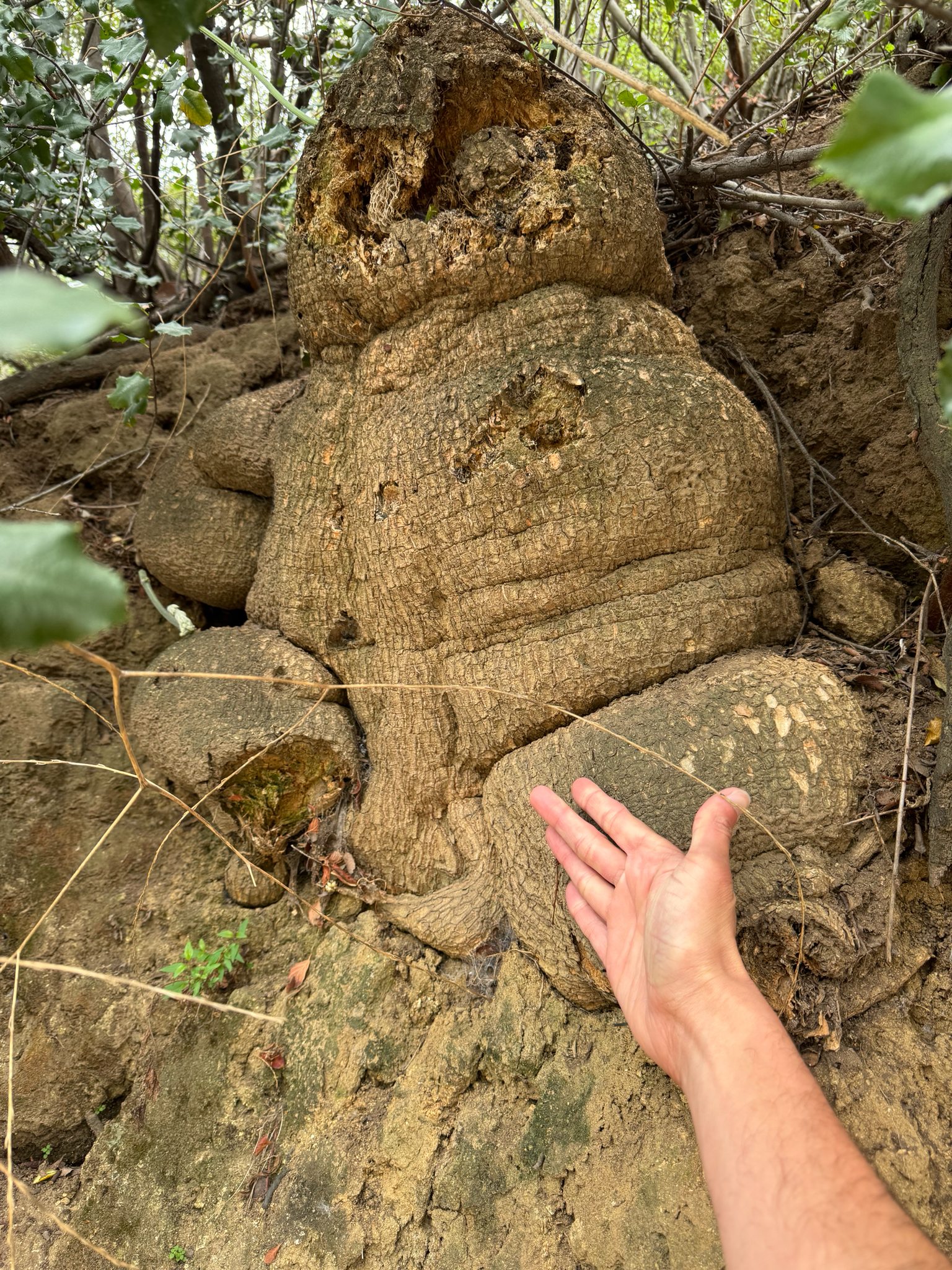
A typical tuber of Marah macrocarpa

It grows by streams, in washes, and on slopes in chaparral and oak woodlands, at elevations up to 900 m (3,000 ft). It will tolerate a variety of soil types and acidities, but it requires seasonally moist soil. Vines can grow in full-sun to partially shaded conditions. It emerges soon after winter rains begin, grows until late spring, and dies back completely in the heat and dryness of summer.

== Uses ==
Ethnographic accounts report that the most common use of Marah macrocarpa was for treating hair loss and baldness on the head. It was reported that the Chumash, Kawaiisu, and Cahuilla peoples roasted the seeds and mashed them into an oily black salve that was applied to the head. Pharmacological research suggests that the Cucurbitacins found in Marah are structurally similar to the antiandrogen medication finasteride and may show similar biological activity, providing support to the traditional uses of the plants for treating hair loss.

The Kumeyaay, Luiseño, Kawaiisu, and Tongva peoples also used M. macrocarpa for the relief of pain and inflammation. The black salve from the roasted seeds was applied to areas of irritation or sores. The black salve was also used for body painting.

All parts of the plants are toxic due to the presence of cucurbitacins and ribosome-inactivating proteins, so it was not traditionally consumed. Other Marah species in different regions were historically consumed in difficult conditions to commit suicide or euthanasia.
