= M. horridus =

M. horridus may refer to:

- Mantidactylus horridus, a frog species endemic to Madagascar
- Marah horridus, the Sierra manroot, a flowering plant species endemic to California
- Moloch horridus, the thorny devil, a lizard species found in Australia

== See also ==
- Horridus (disambiguation)
