= T. horridus =

T. horridus may refer to:

- Triceratops horridus, a herbivorous dinosaur species of the Late Cretaceous Period in what is now North America
- Trichosirocalus horridus, a weevil species found in Europe

== See also ==
- Horridus (disambiguation)
