= Abdopus undulatus =

Scientific classification
- Kingdom: Animalia
- Phylum: Mollusca
- Class: Cephalopoda
- Order: Octopoda
- Family: Octopodidae
- Genus: Abdopus
- Species: A. undulatus

Binomial name
- Abdopus undulatus Huffard, 2007

Species of octopus

Abdopus undulatus is a species of octopus within the family Octopodidae. The species is found near the coasts of Tongatapu, Tonga, in benthic environments at depths of 8 to 20 metres (26 to 66 ft). Individuals grow up to 3.3 centimetres (1.3 in) in length.
