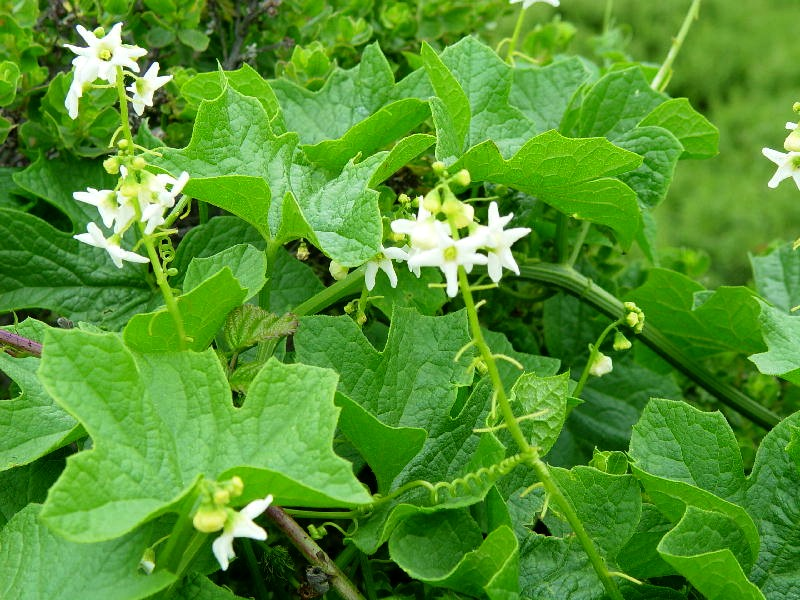
- Marah oregana (coastal manroot)

Scientific classification
- Kingdom: Plantae
- Clade: Tracheophytes
- Clade: Angiosperms
- Clade: Eudicots
- Clade: Rosids
- Order: Cucurbitales
- Family: Cucurbitaceae
- Subfamily: Cucurbitoideae
- Tribe: Sicyoeae
- Genus: Marah; Kellogg

Species
- Marah fabacea (Naudin) Greene; Marah gilensis (Greene) Greene; Marah guadalupensis (S.Watson) Greene; Marah horrida (Congdon) Dunn; Marah macrocarpa (Greene) Greene; Marah micrantha Dunn; Marah oregana (Torr. & A.Gray) Howell; Marah watsonii (Cogn.) Greene

Synonyms
- Megarrhiza Torr. & A.Gray

= Marah (plant) =

Genus of plants

Marah (the manroots, wild cucumbers, or cucumber gourds) are flowering plants in the gourd family (Cucurbitaceae), native to western North America. The genus (which Kellogg noted was characterized by extreme bitterness) was named for Marah in the Book of Exodus, which was said to be named for the bitter water there.

Except for the isolated range of Marah gilensis (Gila manroot) in west-central Arizona and island populations (M. macrocarpus var. major), all manroot species inhabit overlapping ranges distributed from Southern Canada to Northern Mexico. Although Marah oregana (coastal manroot) extends inland into Idaho, all other manroot species except M. gilensis are confined to areas within 300 km of the Pacific Ocean coast.

== Description ==
The manroots are perennial plants, growing from a large tuberous root. Most have stout, scabrous or hairy stems, with coiling tendrils that enable them to climb up other plants; they can also grow rapidly across level ground. Their leaves tend to have multiple lobes, up to 7 in some species. The fruits are striking and easily recognized. They are large, and spherical, oval or cylindrical. At a minimum they are 3 cm (1.2 in) in diameter, but can be up to 20 cm (8 in) long, and in many species they are covered in long spines. Both leaf and fruit shape vary widely between individual plants and leaves can be particularly variable even on the same vine.

The anthropomorphic common names "manroot" and "old man in the ground" derive from the swollen lobes and arm-like extensions of the unearthed tuber. On old plants, the tuber can be several meters long and weigh in excess of 100 kg (220 lb).

== Taxonomy and systematics ==
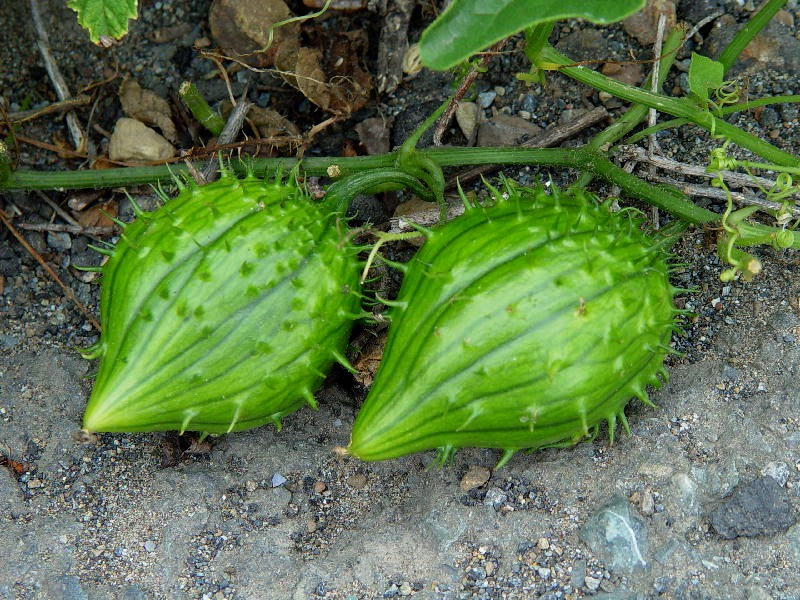
Coastal manroot (Marah oregana) fruit

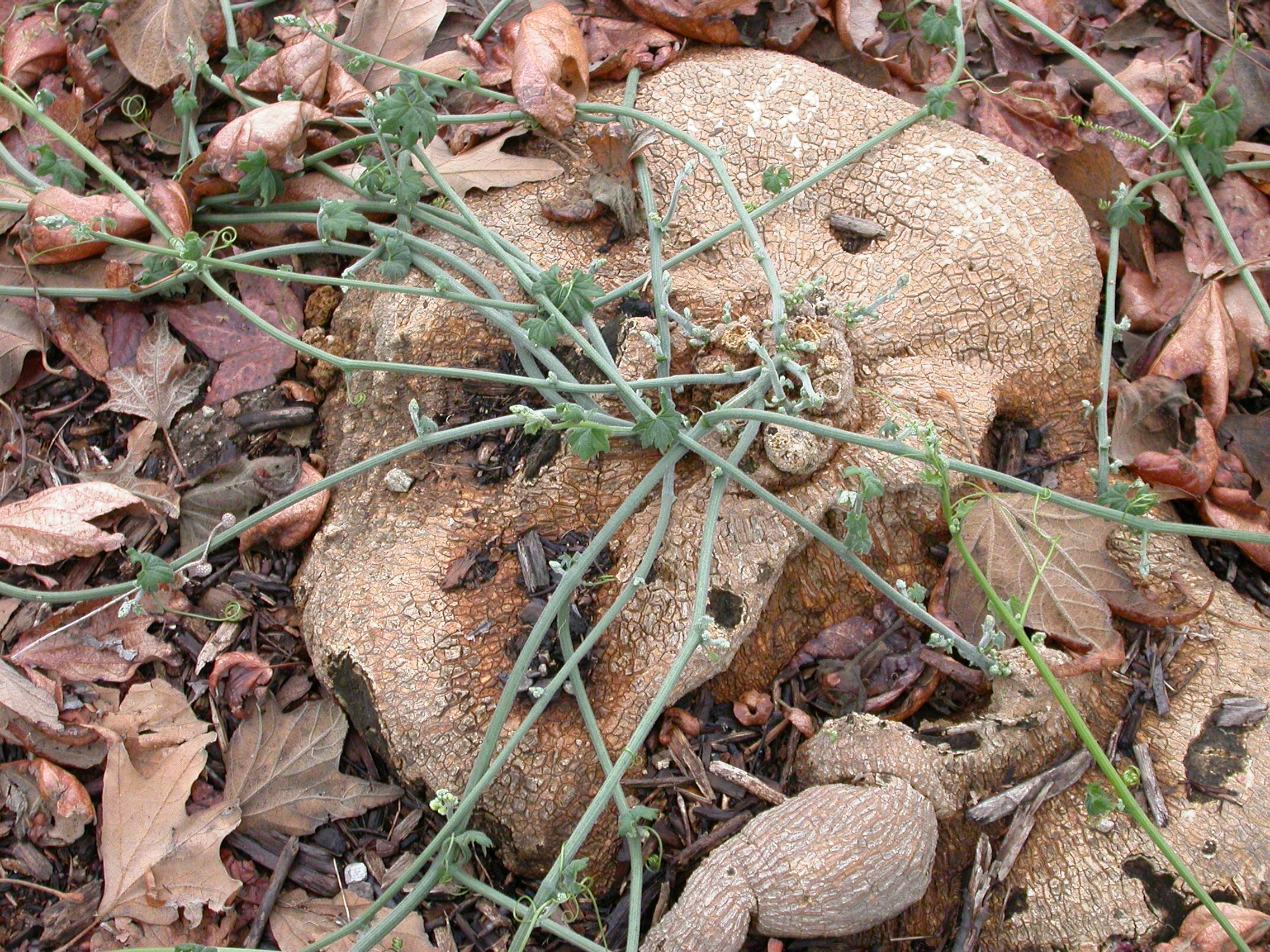
Cucamonga manroot (Marah macrocarpus) root

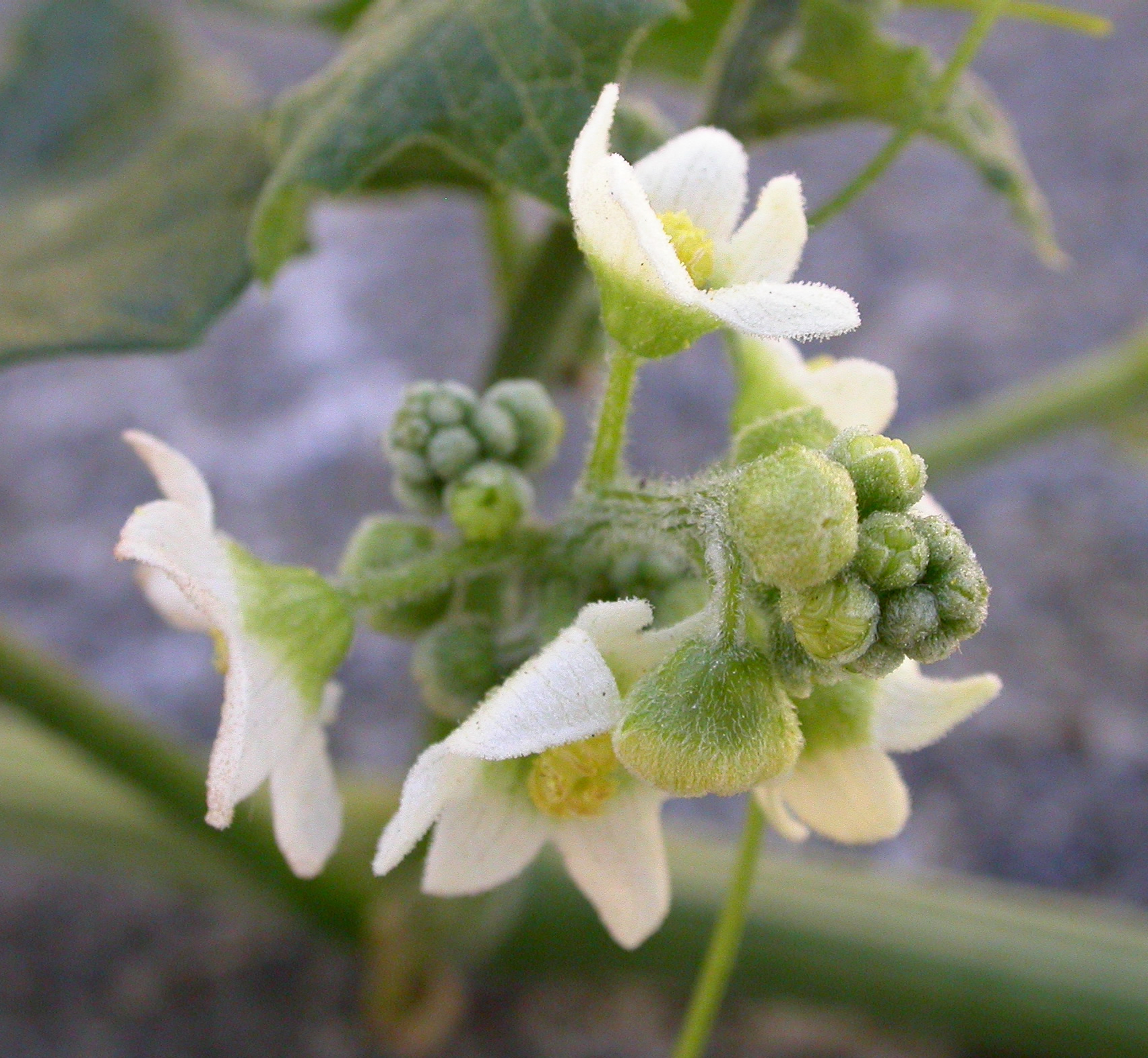
Staminate flowers of Cucamonga manroot (Marah macrocarpus)

Marah species hybridize freely where ranges overlap and this, in addition to intra-species leaf and fruit variability, makes definite identification of specimens a particular challenge.

A proper genetic analysis of Marah phylogeny has not yet been undertaken. The standard taxonomy has been based on morphological comparisons and geographic considerations.

Some authors include the manroots in genus Echinocystis. Considered as a separate genus, however, it includes six to eight species, some of them with well-defined varieties within them:

- Marah fabacea (Naudin) Greene – California manroot
  - Marah fabacea var. agrestis
  - Marah fabacea var. fabacea
- Marah gilensis (Greene) Greene – Gila manroot
- Marah guadalupensis (S.Watson) Greene – often included in M. macrocarpus var. major
- Marah horrida (Congdon) Dunn – Sierra manroot
- Marah macrocarpa (Greene) Greene – Cucamonga manroot
  - Marah macrocarpa var. macrocarpa
  - Marah macrocarpa var. major
  - Marah macrocarpa var. micrantha
- Marah micrantha Dunn
- Marah oregana (Torr. & A.Gray) Howell – coastal manroot
- Marah watsonii (Cogn.) Greene – Taw manroot

== Use by humans ==
Marah oregana are used medicinally by Native Americans. The Chinook make a poultice from the gourd. The Squaxin mash the upper stalk in water to dip aching hands. The Chehalis burn the root and mixed the resulting powder with bear grease to apply to scrofula sores. The Coast Salish make a decoction to treat venereal disease, kidney trouble and scrofula sores.

The dried spiky fruit can be soaked in water so that the spikes can be easily removed. They are difficult to remove otherwise. The hard fruit becomes soft in water and once the spikes are gone, the fruit makes a very efficient loofa. The tubers of M. fabacea and M. macrocarpus contain saponins which can act as a natural soap.

Tubers of M. fabacea are crushed and thrown into bodies of water by the Kumeyaay to immobilize fish. The tubers contain megharrhin, a saponin-like glucoside. Saponins lower the surface tension of water allowing the formation of bubbles. It is likely that the substance enters the fish's circulation through the gill arches where only a single-cell epithelium separates the water from the animal's red blood cells. The affected fish float to the surface.

Like many medicinal plants, at least some Marah species are toxic if ingested and deaths have been reported from ingesting them.

Seeds of Marah fabacea have been reported as being hallucinogenic.
