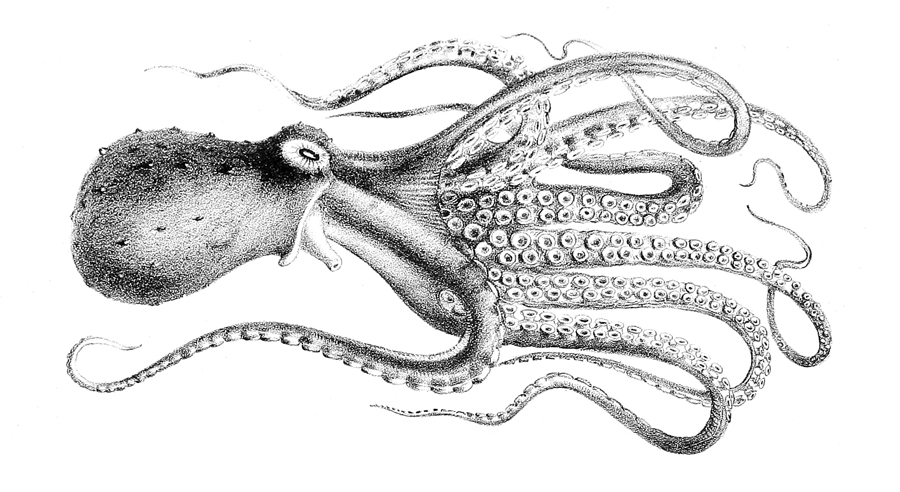

Conservation status
- Data Deficient (IUCN 3.1)

Scientific classification
- Kingdom: Animalia
- Phylum: Mollusca
- Class: Cephalopoda
- Order: Octopoda
- Family: Octopodidae
- Genus: Abdopus
- Species: A. tonganus

Binomial name
- Abdopus tonganus Hoyle, 1885

= Abdopus tonganus =

Species of octopu

Abdopus tonganus is a species of octopus found in Tonga. It was first described as Octopus tonganus in 1885 by William Evans Hoyle based on three mutilated specimens from reefs in Tongatapu.

== Description ==
A. tonganus is small, with a mantle length of up to 35 millimeters. It has a broad mantle, narrow neck, small head, and long arms. The suckers of A. tonganus are large and set deeply into the arms. The skin is rugose. A. tonganus is purple-black dorsally and light yellow-tan ventrally with small, round papillae scattered across the skin. Its eggs are up to 2.8 millimeters in length.

== Distribution ==
The distribution of A. tonganus is known only from its type locality. Like most species in genus abdopus, it is intertidal, typically found in intertidal reefs and shallow water and active during the day.
