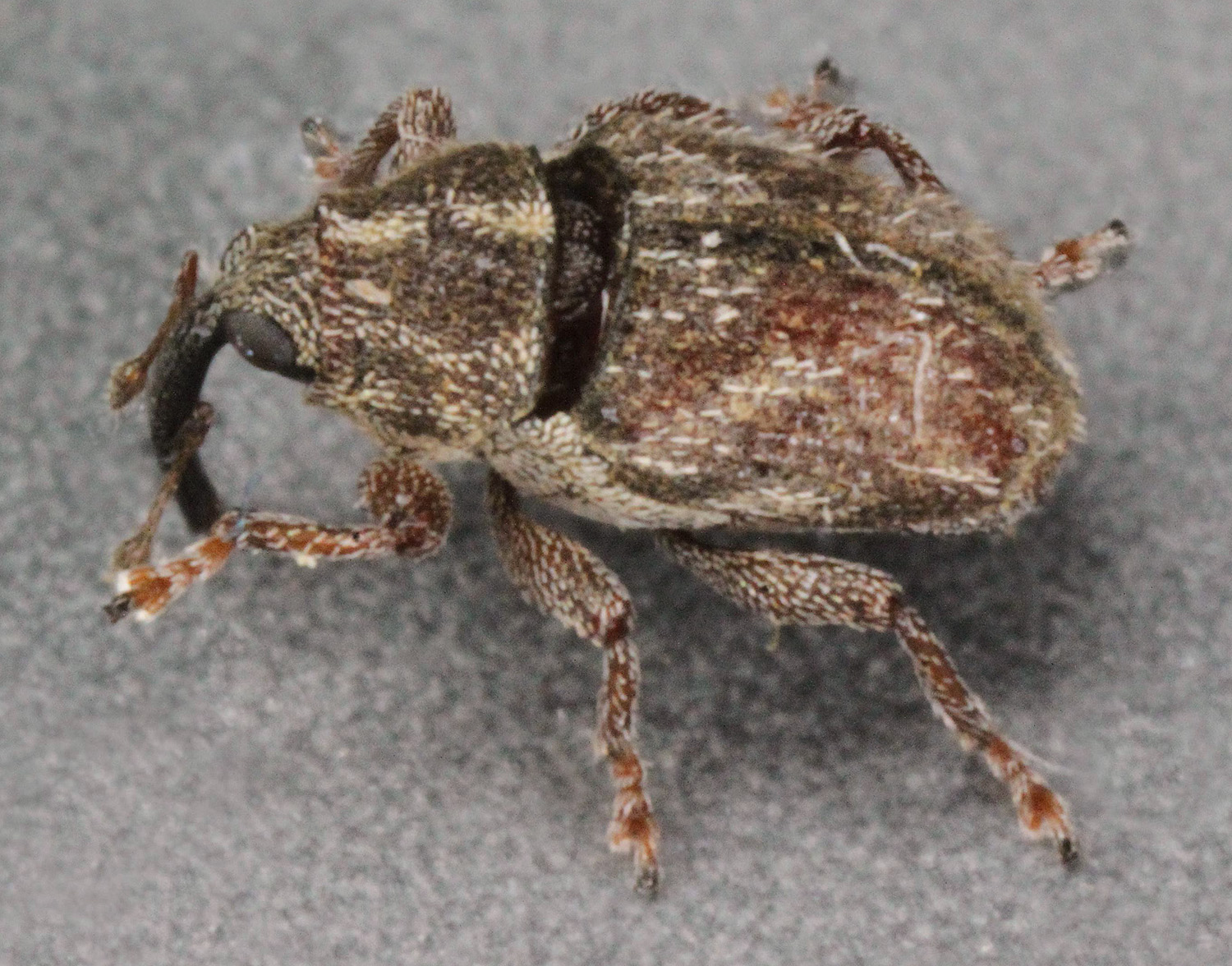

Scientific classification
- Domain: Eukaryota
- Kingdom: Animalia
- Phylum: Arthropoda
- Class: Insecta
- Order: Coleoptera
- Suborder: Polyphaga
- Infraorder: Cucujiformia
- Family: Curculionidae
- Subfamily: Ceutorhynchinae
- Tribe: Ceutorhynchini
- Genus: Trichosirocalus; Colonnelli, 1973

= Trichosirocalus =

Genus of beetles

Trichosirocalus is a genus of true weevils, native to the Old World, placed alternatively in the subfamily Ceutorhynchinae or in the tribe Ceutorhynchini of the subfamily Baridinae.

== Partial species list ==
- Trichosirocalus horridus Panzer, 1801
- Trichosirocalus troglodytes
