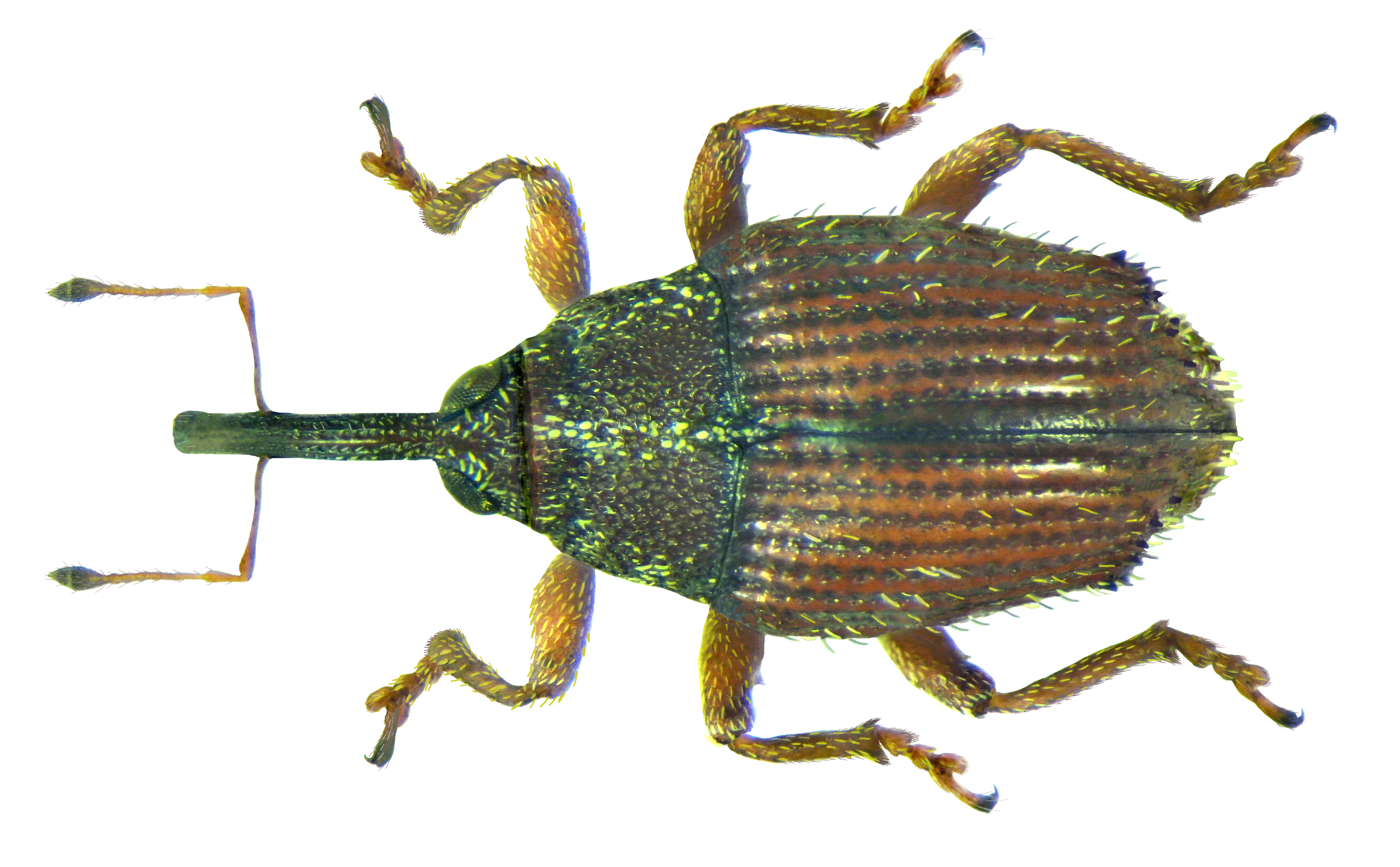
- Trichosirocalus troglodytes 2,6 mm (2,3-2,9 mm)

Scientific classification
- Kingdom: Animalia
- Phylum: Arthropoda
- Clade: Pancrustacea
- Class: Insecta
- Order: Coleoptera
- Suborder: Polyphaga
- Infraorder: Cucujiformia
- Superfamily: Curculionoidea
- Family: Curculionidae
- Genus: Trichosirocalus
- Species: T. troglodytes

Binomial name
- Trichosirocalus troglodytes (Fabricius, 1787)

= Trichosirocalus troglodytes =

Species of beetle

Trichosirocalus troglodytes is a species of weevil native to Europe.
