= Marah gilensis =

Scientific classification
- Kingdom: Plantae
- Clade: Tracheophytes
- Clade: Angiosperms
- Clade: Eudicots
- Clade: Rosids
- Order: Cucurbitales
- Family: Cucurbitaceae
- Genus: Marah
- Species: M. gilensis

Binomial name
- Marah gilensis Greene

Species of flowering plant

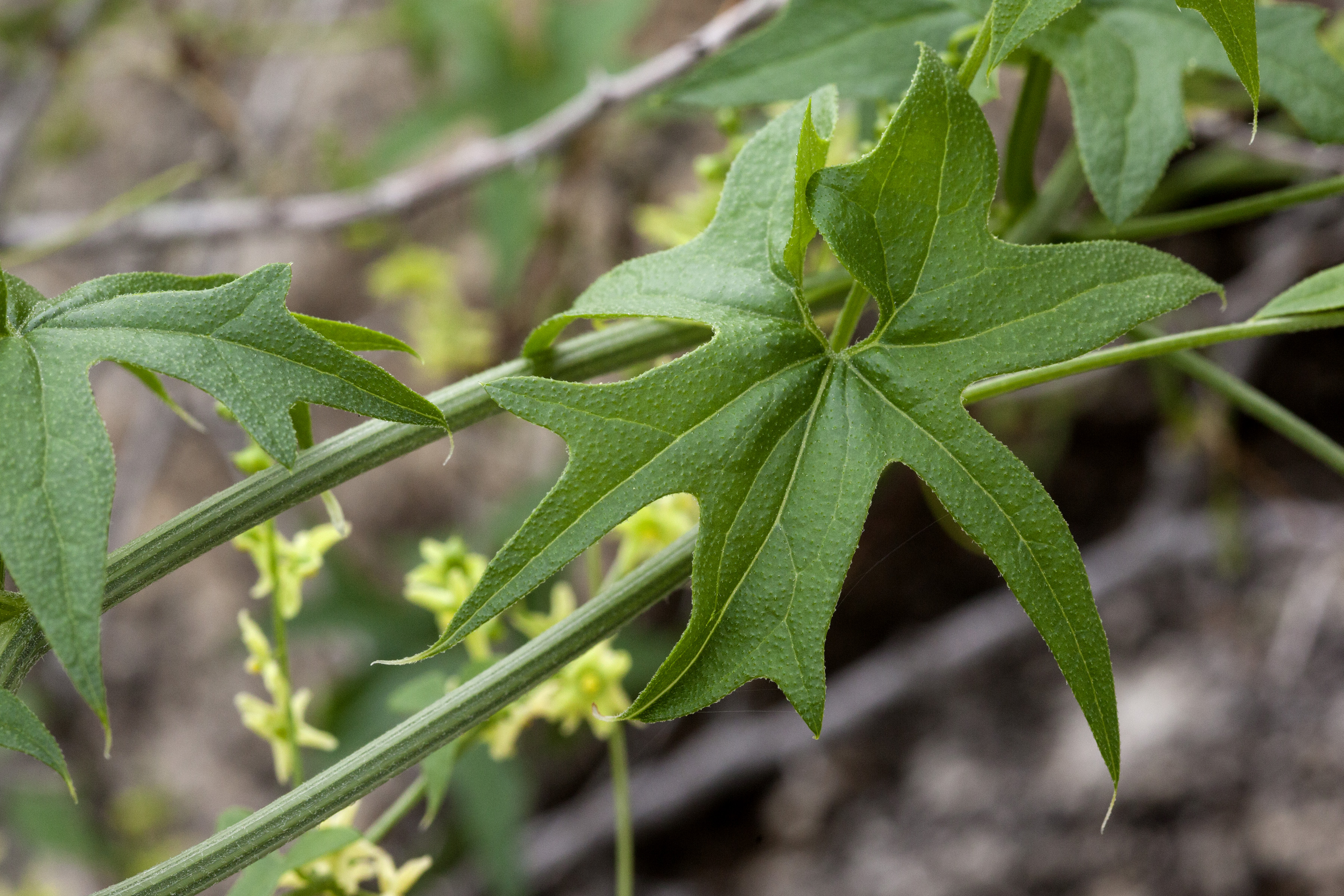
Marah gilensis

Marah gilensis, commonly known as the Gila manroot, is a species of flowering plant in the family Cucurbitaceae, endemic to Arizona and New Mexico in the United States.

== Description ==
Marah gilensis is a perennial vine growing from a large, branched tuber. This produces fleshy climbing shoots in spring, which grow to a height of 6 ft (1.8 m) or more, and scramble over trees and shrubs, clinging to them with coiled tendrils. The leaves are rather variable, glossy green and palmately-lobed, with three to seven lobes which are oblong-lanceolate or triangular, smooth above and hairy below. The flowers are white, yellow or greenish-white and have four or five corolla-lobes, separate male and female flowers being borne on the same plant. The flowers are 6 to 10 millimetres (0.2 to 0.4 in) in diameter. The fruit is 2 to 3 centimetres (0.8 to 1.2 in) in diameter, fleshy and bright green, with strong, smooth spines.

== Distribution and habitat ==
Marah gilensis is an uncommon plant with a restricted range in the Southwestern Region of the United States. It is present in Arizona where it is found in the northwestern, central and southern parts of the state at altitudes of up to 5,000 feet (1,500 m). It is also listed in New Mexico. It typically grows near streams in wooded thickets, or in sandy washes.

== Ecology ==
Marah gilensis is a desert plant, adapted to the climate of hot dry summers and cold winters. The foliage dies back in the fall and sprouts again from the tuber in the spring. The sprouts may be damaged by late frosts but the tubers resprout. Some of the plants which grow in association with Marah gilensis are Celtis ehrenbergiana, Ziziphus obtusifolia, Senegalia greggii, Opuntia engelmannii, Eragrostis lehmanniana, Calliandra eriophylla, Ericameria laricifolia, Bouteloua aristidoides, Bouteloua curtipendula, Bouteloua hirsuta and Bouteloua eriopoda.
