= Marah watsonii =

Scientific classification
- Kingdom: Plantae
- Clade: Tracheophytes
- Clade: Angiosperms
- Clade: Eudicots
- Clade: Rosids
- Order: Cucurbitales
- Family: Cucurbitaceae
- Genus: Marah
- Species: M. watsonii

Binomial name
- Marah watsonii (Cogn.) Greene

Synonyms
- Echinocystis watsonii Cogn. Echinocystis marah Cogn. Echinocystis muricata Kellogg; Marah muricata Kellogg; Megarrhiza marah S.Watson; Megarrhiza muricata (Kellogg) S.Watson; Micrampelis marah (S.Watson) Greene; Micrampelis muricata Greene; Micrampelis watsonii Greene

Species of flowering plant

Marah watsonii, the taw manroot, is an uncommon species in the genus Marah endemic to central northern California. Its range is bounded by the eastern coastal foothills, the western foothills of the northern Sierra Nevada and Cascades ranges and from Lake Berryessa in the south to Lake Shasta in the north.

== Description ==
=== Foliage ===
Taw manroot shares with all marah species non-twining stems and tendrils. Unlike other manroot species, however, Marah watsonii vines are nearly hairless with a glaucous, grey-green color. Vines appear in late winter or early spring in response to increased rainfall, and can climb or scramble to a length of 6 meters (20 ft). Unlike the leaves of other manroot species, taw manroot leaves are highly dissected and multi-lobed - reminiscent of jigsaw puzzle pieces.

Vines emerge from a large, hard tuberous root which can reach several meters in length and weigh in excess of 100 kilograms (220 lb). Newly exposed tubers can be seen along road-cuts or eroded slopes and have a scaly, tan-colored surface. Injured or decaying tubers take on a golden or orange color.

=== Flower ===
Flowers are white. Flowers appear soon after the vine emerges. The flowers are monoecious, that is, individual flowers are either male or female, but both sexes can be found on the same plant. Male flowers appear in open spikes while females flowers, distinguished by a swollen base, usually appear individually and hang down from the axis of the male flower-spike. The plant is self-fertile, i.e. pollen from the male flowers can fertilize the female flowers on the same plant; pollination is by insects.

=== Fruit ===
The fruit is spherical to oblong, 6–8 centimeters (2.4–3.1 in) in diameter, and suspended from a long, wrinkled stem. Taw manroot fruit have fewer and more robust, hornlike spikes than other manroot species with the spikes tapering to smooth ridges at the bottom of the fruit. Some plants have smooth fruit with dark green veins running from top to bottom. Unripe fruit are light green, sometimes with faint dark green stripes, ripening to yellow. Fruit begin to form in spring and ripen as the vine dies from the heat and drought of late spring/early summer. The fruit swells as it ripens until finally rupturing and expelling the large seeds. In more moist areas, the vine may stay green until after fruit have ruptured.

=== Seeds and germination ===
Marah watsonii seeds are more spherical than other manroot species. Fruits usually hold four or more of these large seeds. Seeds have an unusual germination process. The initial shoot emerges from the seed and grows downward into the earth. This shoot then splits, one part beginning to swell and form the tuber, while the second part grows back to the surface and becomes the vine.

== Habitat ==
Taw manroot grows most vigorously by streams or in washes but can also be successful in dryer areas, at elevations up to 1,600 meters (5,200 ft). It will tolerate a variety of soil types and acidities, but it requires at least seasonally moist soil. Vines can grow in full-sun to heavily shaded conditions. Vines die back in summer and emerge in late winter.

== Uses ==
All parts of the plant have a bitter taste (this is the meaning of the genus name Marah, which comes from Hebrew). Despite this, the leaves have been used as a vegetable. The large tuber of the manroot can be processed for a soap-like extract.
