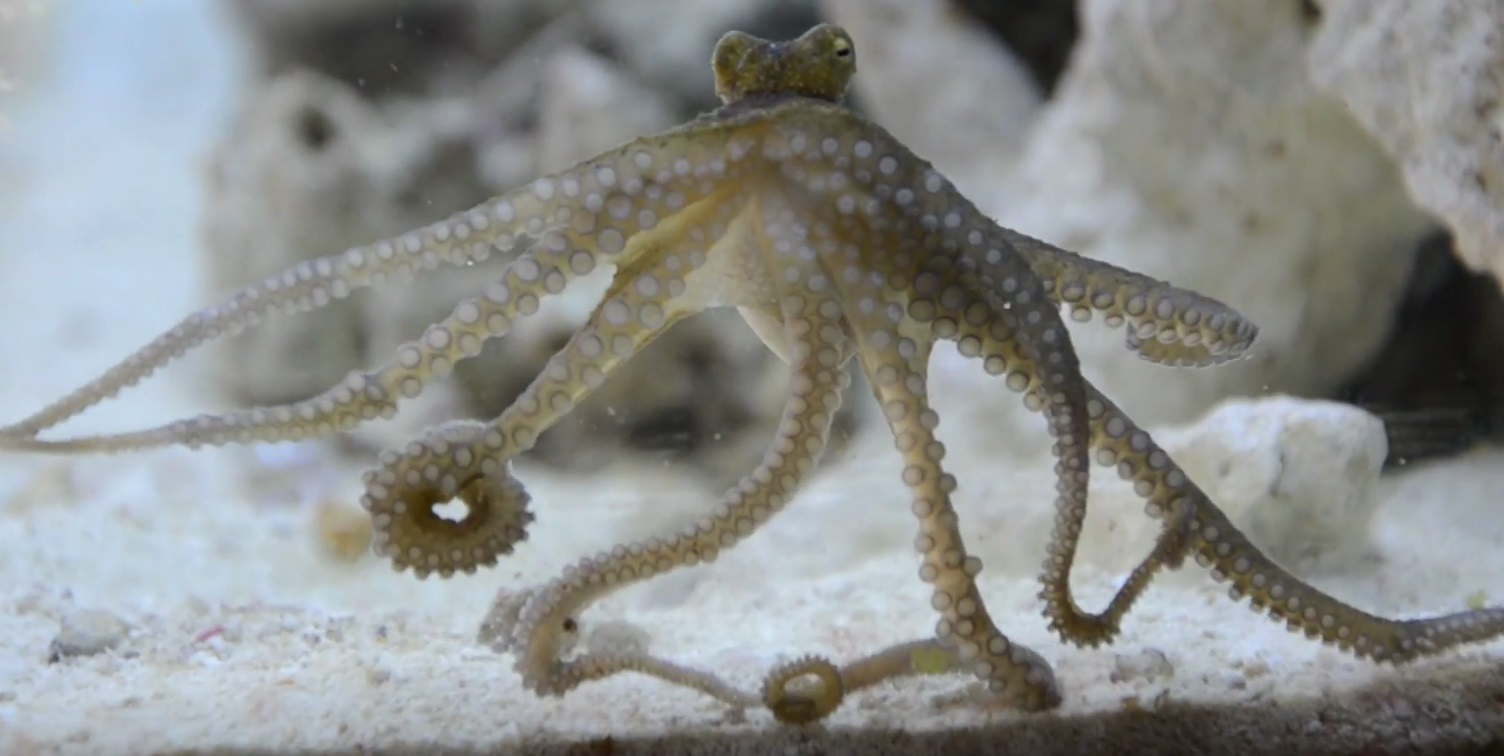

Conservation status
- Least Concern (IUCN 3.1)

Scientific classification
- Kingdom: Animalia
- Phylum: Mollusca
- Class: Cephalopoda
- Order: Octopoda
- Family: Octopodidae
- Genus: Abdopus
- Species: A. aculeatus

Binomial name
- Abdopus aculeatus (d'Orbigny, 1834)

Synonyms
- Octopus aculeatus d'Orbigny, 1834; Octopus harmandi Rochebrune, 1882

= Abdopus aculeatus =

Species of cephalopod

Abdopus aculeatus is a small species of octopus in the order Octopoda. It has the common name algae octopus due to its typical resting camouflage, which resembles a gastropod shell overgrown with algae. It is small in size with a mantle around the size of a small orange (c. 7 cm or 3 inches) and arms 25 cm (10 inches) in length, and is adept at mimicking its surroundings.

== World range and habitat ==
Algae octopuses are found throughout intertidal zones along the Indonesian, Philippine, and Northern Australian coastlines. They primarily live in areas with abundant sea grass coverage and occupy dens built into the sandy seafloor, which they line with small pebbles. In its resting camouflage, A. aculeatus displays mottled ochre, gray, and brown colors that resemble a shell overgrown with algae, and dark arm bars reminiscent of hermit crab legs.

== Feeding behavior ==
Algae octopuses are most active during the day, leaving their dens to forage and returning at night. In some areas (mainly Northern Australia), Algae Octopuses will forage among coral, but typically they do not. They tend to feed on small crustaceans including portunid and calappid crabs by groping and pouncing on small rocks and clusters of algae, and digging into the sand. They will chase their prey by jetting, the act of forcing water out of their siphon in order to propel their body forward, head first. Once they catch their prey they use their sharp beak to "drill" into its exoskeleton and reach the muscle within. Most often they will eat their prey on site, but on occasion when they consume their prey near their den, they will carry the exoskeleton up to one meter (3 1/4 feet) away to discard it.

A. aculeatus is often confused with "the only land octopus"; a currently undescribed species of the same genus first discovered in 2011, however, due to distinct phenotypic differences, there is no evidence to suggest the two species are the same.

== Life history ==
A. aculeatus demonstrates one of the most complex mating cultures of any documented octopus species. They participate in three distinct mating strategies: mate guarding, transient copulation, and sneaker mating. Larger males and females will have adjacent dens, where the male is able to extend his mating arm (hectocotylus) to the female's den, while resting in his own. These two individuals are paired and mate repeatedly for up to a week. However, the female does not remain monogamous to her mate, and may respond to sneaker mating from other males. In this instance, the guarding male may be present or away foraging, and a smaller male (the sneaker) approaches the female's den from an angle obstructed from the guarding male, sometimes camouflaged as a small female itself, to mate with the female. The third mating tactic is transient copulation, where a male will mate with an opportunistic female (typically smaller than the guarded females) that he encounters while foraging. In all cases of successful copulation, the male uses the hectocotylus to transfer sperm packages (spermatophores) to the female. After successful mating, female will retreat to her den and cover the entrance with rubble. She remains in her den for several days, spawning multiple festoons equating to thousands of eggs. After spawning, she will remain with her eggs until they hatch, cleaning and caring for them. The hatchlings are planktonic (c. 2 mm or 3/32 inch in size) and will not have parental protection after hatching, as algae octopuses are semelparous, dying shortly after their young are hatched. As the hatchlings grow larger, they remain in the intertidal zones and begin to burrow into the sandy bottom.

Juvenile and adult algae octopuses have a unique method of locomotion. In addition to the common tactics of swimming, crawling and jetting, algae octopuses participate in upright, bi-pedal locomotion, as does one other octopus species Amphioctopus marginatus. This is a fast method of movement used for escape and often paired with crypsis, or camouflage to mimic surrounding sea grass.

Octopus bimaculoides may be a closely related species, as the two share many skin components that are the basis for their camouflage tactics, though this may also be evidence of evolutionary convergence.
