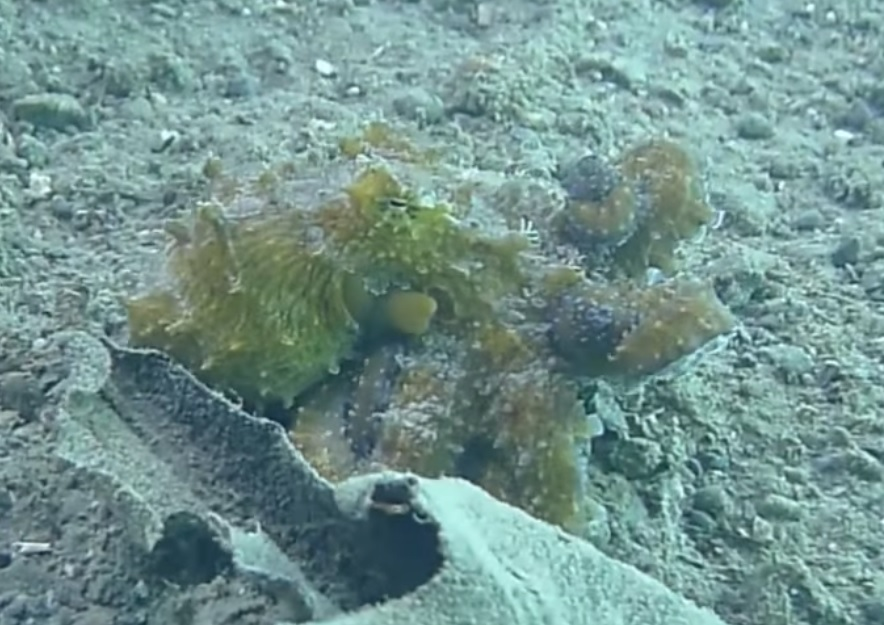

Conservation status
- Data Deficient (IUCN 3.1)

Scientific classification
- Kingdom: Animalia
- Phylum: Mollusca
- Class: Cephalopoda
- Order: Octopoda
- Family: Octopodidae
- Genus: Abdopus
- Species: A. abaculus

Binomial name
- Abdopus abaculus Norman & Sweeney, 1997

= Abdopus abaculus =

Species of octopus

Abdopus abaculus, or the mosaic octopus, is a species of pygmy octopus. It was first described as Octopus abaculus by M. D. Norman and M. J. Sweeney in 1997 based on specimens caught in Zamboanga del Norte, Philippines.

== Description ==
A. abaculus have a mantle length of up to 33 millimetres (1.3 in) and a weight of up to 21 grams (0.74 oz). Arms are 4.5 to 6 times the length of the mantle. A. abaculus is dark gray to dark purple with cream to light purple spots. It has up to 204 suckers on normal arms and up to 121 on hectocotylised arms.

== Distribution ==
A. abaculus is found in the Philippines, and has also been reported in Tonga, Fiji, and Japan. It is found at depths of zero to five metres (0 to 16 ft).

== Reproduction ==
A. abaculus lays eggs of up to 2.4 millimetres (0.09 in).
