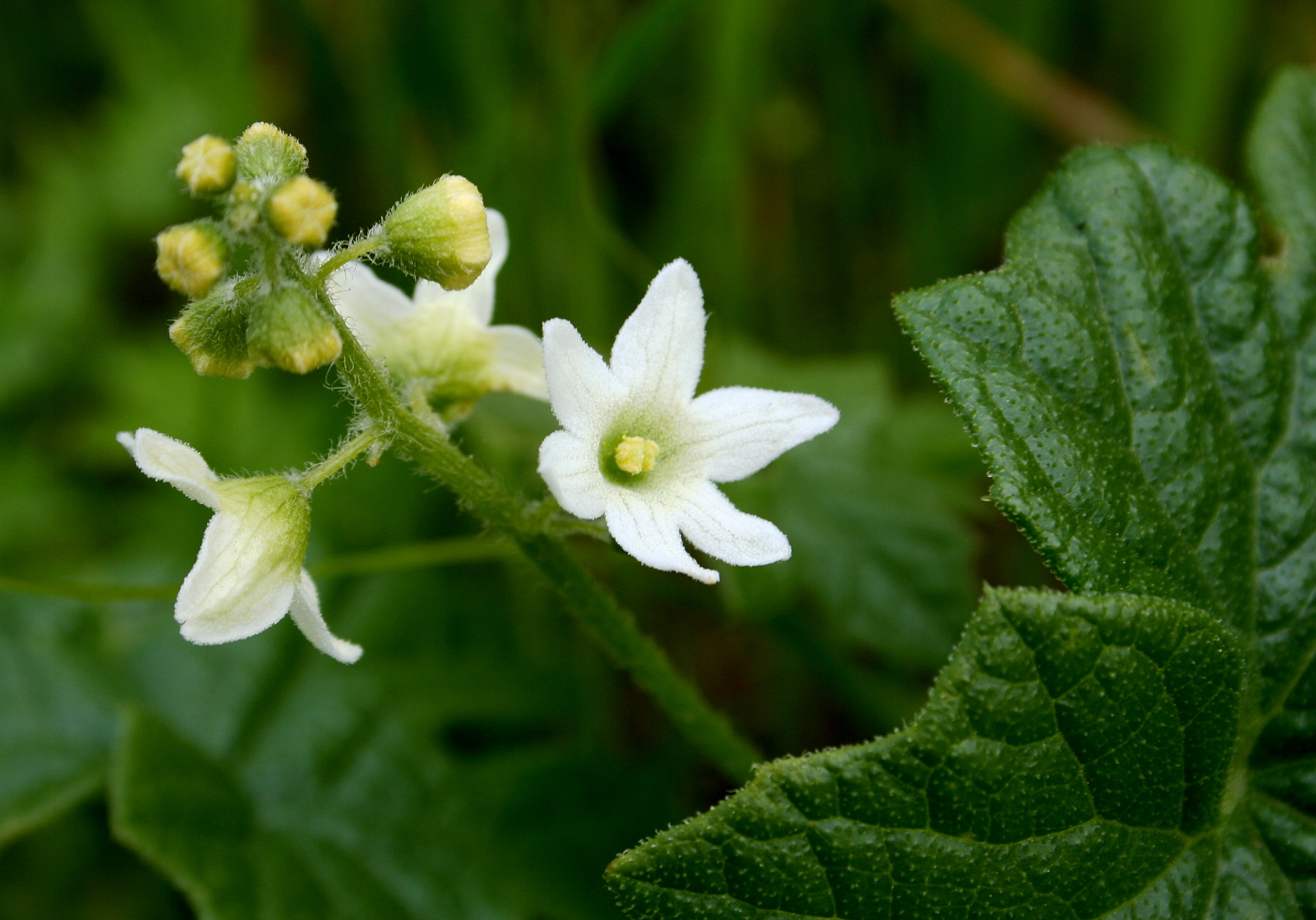

Scientific classification
- Kingdom: Plantae
- Clade: Tracheophytes
- Clade: Angiosperms
- Clade: Eudicots
- Clade: Rosids
- Order: Cucurbitales
- Family: Cucurbitaceae
- Genus: Marah
- Species: M. fabacea

Binomial name
- Marah fabacea (Naudin) Greene

Synonyms
- Echinocystis fabacea Naudin (1859) (basionym); Echinocystis fabacea var. agrestis Congdon; Echinocystis fabacea var. inermis (Congdon) Jeps.; Echinocystis inermis Congdon; Echinocystis scabrida Eastw.; Marah fabacea var. agrestis (Congdon) Stocking; Marah inermis (Congdon) Dunn; Megarrhiza californica Torr.; Micrampelis fabacea (Naudin) Greene; Micrampelis fabacea var. agrestis Greene

= Marah fabacea =

Species of flowering plant

Marah fabacea (sometimes spelled Marah fabaceus), the California manroot or bigroot, is the most common of the manroot species native to California. Its range throughout the state subsumes nearly the entire ranges of all the other California native manroots species and intergrades. Hybrids between California manroot and other species of Marah are common.

== Foliage ==
Like other manroots, Marah fabacea has stout, hairy stems with tendrils. Vines appear in late winter in response to increased rainfall, and can climb or scramble to a length of 6 meters. Its leaves typically have five lobes with individual plants showing wide variation in leaf size and lobe length.

Vines emerge from a large, hard tuberous root which can reach several meters in length and weigh in excess of 100 kilograms. Newly exposed tubers can be seen along roadcuts or eroded slopes and have a scaley, tan-colored surface. Injured or decaying tubers take on a golden or orange color.

== Flower ==
The flower can vary in color from yellowish green to cream to white. Flowers appear soon after the vine emerges. The flowers are monoecious, that is, individual flowers are either male or female, but both sexes can be found on the same plant. Male flowers appear in open clusters while females flowers, distinguished by a swollen base, usually appear individually. The plant is self-fertile; pollen from the male flowers can fertilize the female flowers on the same plant. Pollination is by insects.

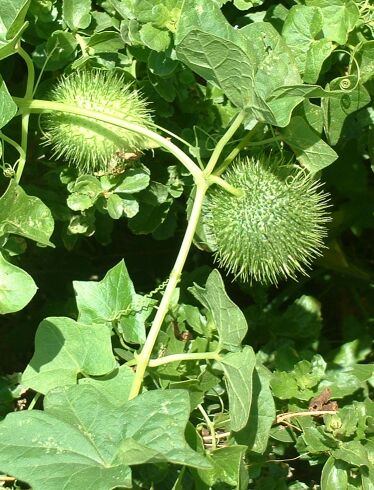
Fruit

== Fruit ==
The fruit is spherical, 4 to 5 centimeters in diameter, and covered in prickles of variable density, up to 1 centimeter long but without hooks. Unripe fruit are bright green, ripening to yellow. The fruit swells as it ripens until finally rupturing and releasing the large seeds. Fruit begin to form in spring and ripen by early summer. The fruit can induce vomiting and diarrhea.

== Seeds and germination ==
Seeds of the California manroot are large, hard, and very smooth. Fruit usually hold 4 or more seeds. Seeds sprout in the cool wetness of late winter. Seeds have an intriguing germination process. The initial shoot emerges from the seed and grows downward into the earth. This shoot then splits, one part beginning to swell and form the tuber, while the second part grows back to the surface and becomes the vine.

== Ecology ==
The California manroot grows most vigorously by streams or in washes but is also successful in dry chaparral, at elevations up to 1600 metres. It ranges through most of California except the far northwest and the Mojave Desert. It will tolerate a variety of soil types and acidities, but it requires seasonally moist soil. Vines can grow in full-sun to partially shaded conditions. In mild areas where year-round moisture is available, vines can be perennial. In the Mediterranean climate areas of California, manroot emerges soon after winter rains begin, grows until late spring, and dies back completely in the heat and dryness of summer.

== Taxonomy ==
Two varieties have previously been recognized: Marah fabaceus var. agrestis (found in the San Francisco Bay Area and Contra Costa County), and Marah fabaceus var. fabaceus (found elsewhere in California). An example occurrence of M. f. agrestis is on Ring Mountain in Marin County, California.

== Uses ==
The tubers of Marah fabacea were crushed and thrown into surface waters by some Native American tribes, including the Kumeyaay and the Coast Miwok, to immobilize fish. The tubers contain megharrhin, a saponin-like glucoside. Saponins lower the surface tension of water allowing the formation of bubbles. It is likely that the substance enters the fish's circulation through the gill arches where only a single-cell epithelium separates the water from the animal’s red blood cells. The affected fish float to the surface.

All parts of the plant have a bitter taste (this is the meaning of the genus name Marah, which comes from Hebrew). Despite this, the leaves have been used as a vegetable. Due to its saponin content, the large tuber of the manroot can be processed for a soap-like extract. The liquid inside the fruit is an eye irritant, and the spines on the fruit are irritating to the skin.
