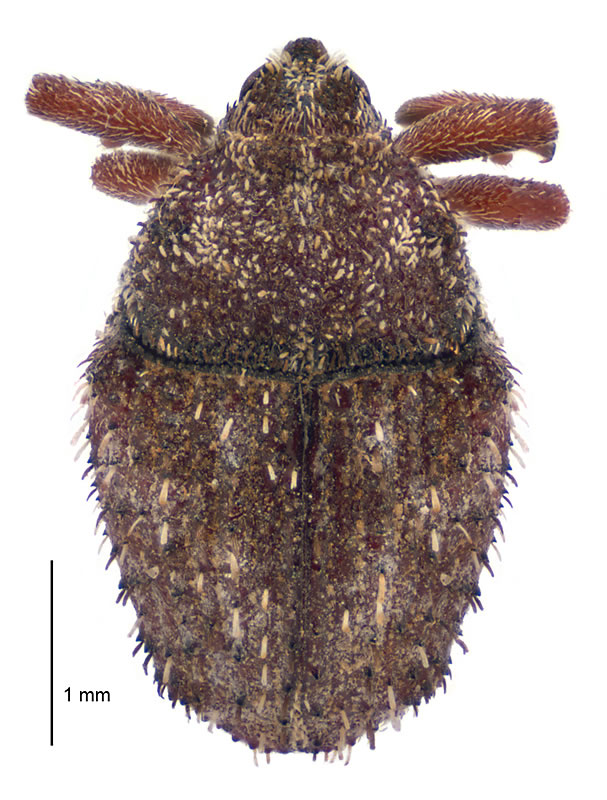

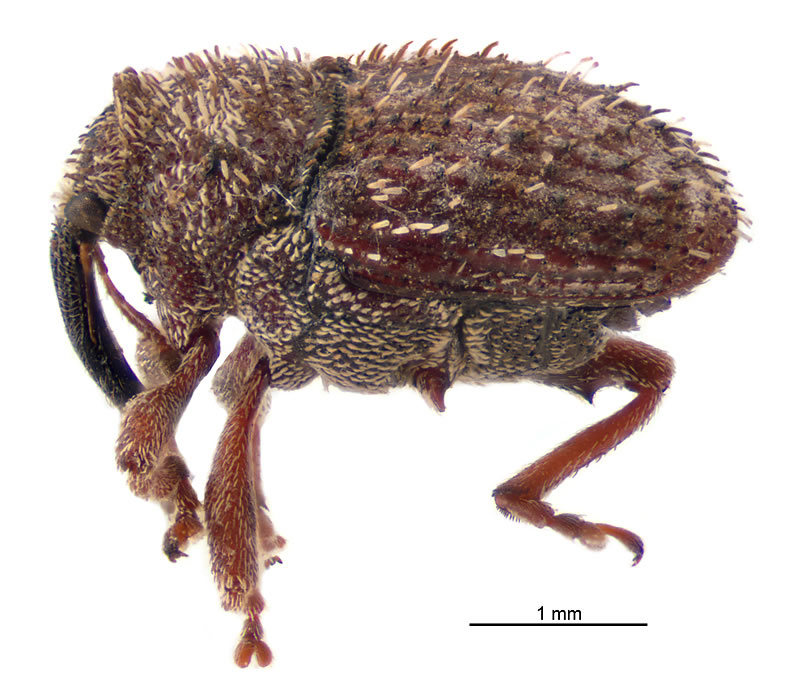

Scientific classification
- Kingdom: Animalia
- Phylum: Arthropoda
- Clade: Pancrustacea
- Class: Insecta
- Order: Coleoptera
- Suborder: Polyphaga
- Infraorder: Cucujiformia
- Family: Curculionidae
- Genus: Trichosirocalus
- Species: T. horridus

Binomial name
- Trichosirocalus horridus (Panzer, 1801)

= Trichosirocalus horridus =

Species of beetle

Trichosirocalus horridus is a species of true weevil, native to Europe. It is a biological pest control agent that was introduced into the United States in 1974 to control exotic thistles, especially in the Cirsium and Carduus genera.

== Life history ==
Trichosirocalus horridus feeds on the rosettes of thistles, with the larvae causing most damage to the plant.

== Nontarget impacts ==
In 2004, T. horridus was observed feeding on the native thistle Cirsium altissimum L. in Nebraska. The weevil was observed on the native thistle at about the same rate as the targeted invasive thistle (Cirsium vulgare). T. horridus has also been observed feeding on 5 native Cirsium species in Tennessee.
