= Abdopus =

Scientific classification
- Kingdom: Animalia
- Phylum: Mollusca
- Class: Cephalopoda
- Order: Octopoda
- Family: Octopodidae
- Genus: Abdopus; Norman & Finn, 2001

Type species
- Octopus horridus d'Orbigny, 1826

Species
- See text.

Synonyms
- Octopus (Abdopus) Norman & Finn, 2001

Genus of octopuses

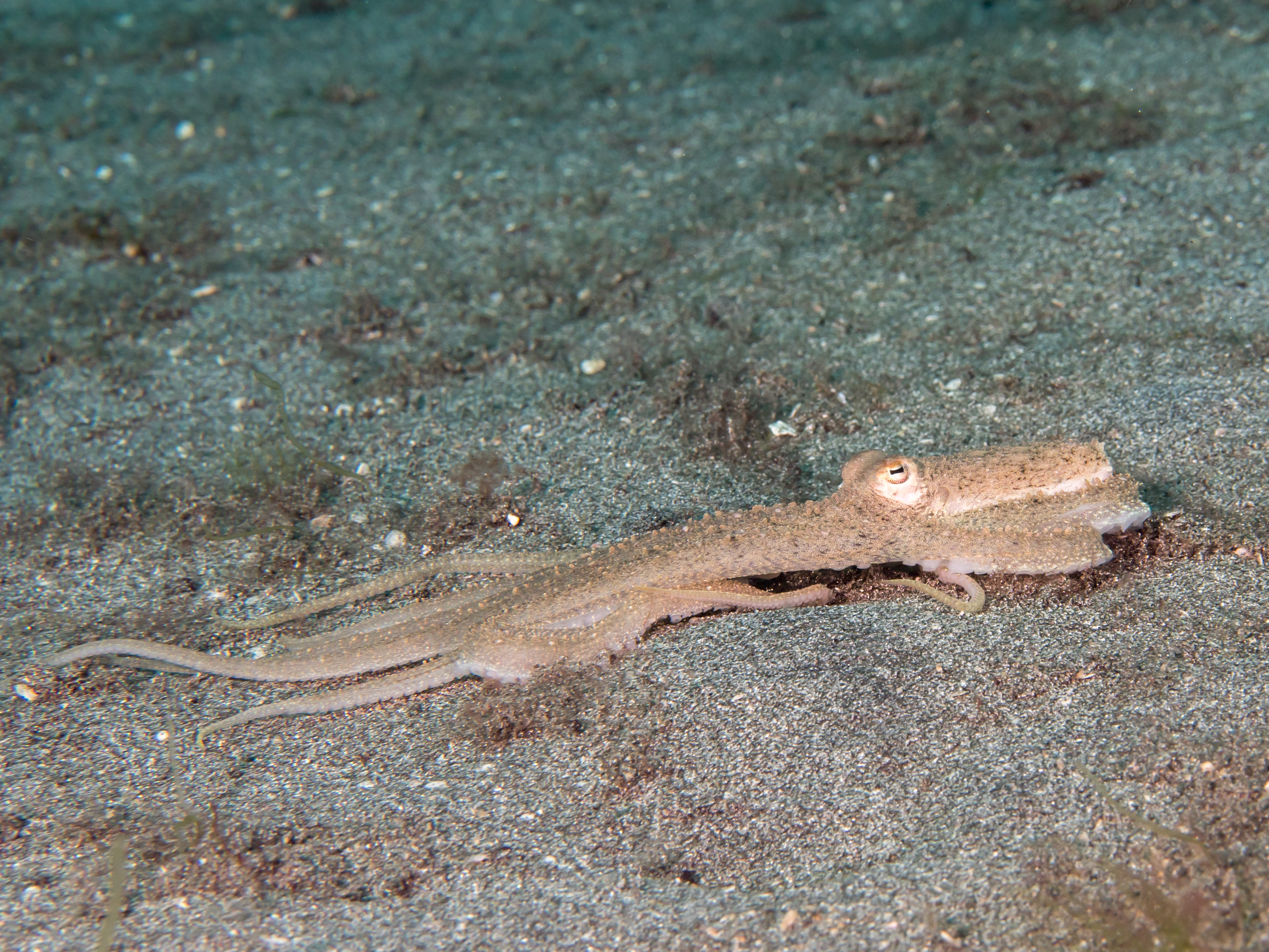
Image of Abdopus on the sea floor.

Abdopus is a genus of octopuses in the family Octopodidae.

== Species ==
- Abdopus abaculus (Norman & Sweeney, 1997) – mosaic octopus
- Abdopus aculeatus (d'Orbigny, 1834) – algae octopus
- Abdopus capricornicus (Norman & Finn, 2001)
- Abdopus horridus (d'Orbigny, 1826) – Red Sea octopus
- Abdopus tenebricus (Smith, 1884)
- Abdopus tonganus (Hoyle, 1885)
- Abdopus undulatus (Huffard, 2007)

Taxon inquirendum

- Abdopus guangdongensis (Dong, 1976)
