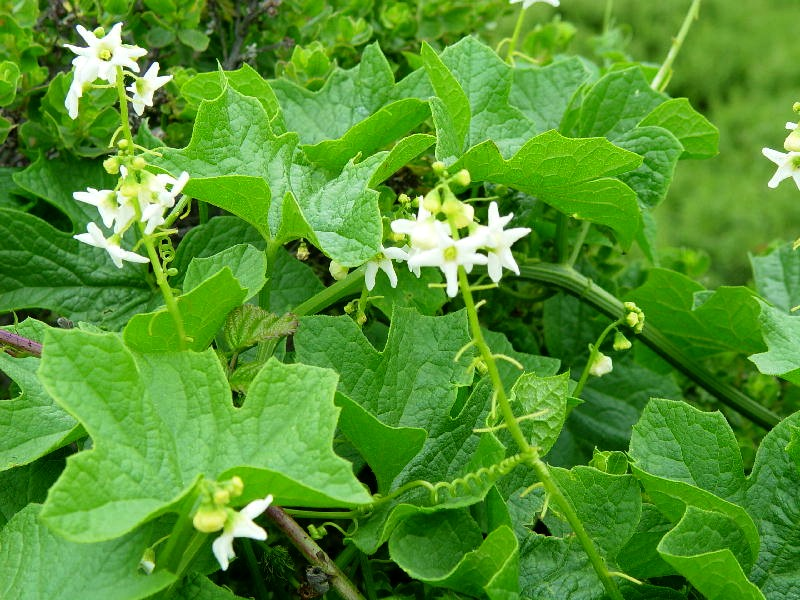

Scientific classification
- Kingdom: Plantae
- Clade: Embryophytes
- Clade: Tracheophytes
- Clade: Angiosperms
- Clade: Eudicots
- Clade: Rosids
- Order: Cucurbitales
- Family: Cucurbitaceae
- Genus: Marah
- Species: M. oregana

Binomial name
- Marah oregana (Torr. & A.Gray) Howell

Synonyms
- Echinocystis oregana (Torr. & A.Gray) Cogn.; Megarrhiza oregona (Torr. & A.Gray) Torr.; Micrampelis oregona Greene; Sicyos oreganus Torr. & A.Gray

= Marah oregana =

Species of tree

Marah oregana, the Oregon manroot, coastal manroot or western wild-cucumber, is a common manroot of the northwest coast of the United States. It ranges from California north to Vancouver Island in southwestern Canada.

== Foliage ==
Coastal manroot has the least pubescent bud, leaves, and branches of all the manroot species. Populations in more northern climates are nearly hairless with glossy leaves. Vines appear in late winter or early spring in response to increased rainfall, and can climb or scramble to a length of 6m. Its leaves typically have five lobes with individual plants showing wide variation in leaf size and lobe length. Although leaf size is highly variable, coastal manroot tends to have larger leaves than other Marah species.

Vines emerge from a large, hard tuberous root which can reach several meters in length and weigh in excess of 100 kg. Newly exposed tubers can be seen along roadcuts or eroded slopes and have a scaly, tan-colored surface. Injured or decaying tubers take on a golden or orange color.

== Flower ==
The flower can vary in color from yellowish green to cream to white. Flowers appear soon after the vine emerges. The flowers are monoecious, that is, individual flowers are either male or female, but both sexes can be found on the same plant. Male flowers appear in open spikes while females flowers, distinguished by a swollen base, usually appear individually. The plant is self-fertile, i.e. pollen from the male flowers can fertilize the female flowers on the same plant; pollination is by insects.

== Fruit ==
The fruit is spherical, 4–5 cm in diameter, and covered in prickles of variable density, up to 1 cm long but without hooks. Unripe fruit are bright green, ripening to yellow. The fruit swells as it ripens until finally rupturing and releasing the large seeds. Fruit begin to form in spring and ripen in summer.

== Seeds and germination ==
Seeds of the coastal manroot are large, hard, and smooth. Unlike the bullet-shaped seeds of other Marah species, coastal manroot seeds are more flattened and disc-like. Fruit usually hold 4 or more seeds. Seeds have an intriguing germination process. The initial shoot emerges from the seed and grows downward into the earth. This shoot then splits, one part beginning to swell and form the tuber, while the second part grows back to the surface and becomes the vine.

The seeds may be fatally poisonous.

== Habitats ==
Coastal manroot grows most vigorously by streams or in washes but can also be successful in dryer areas, at elevations up to 1600 metres. It will tolerate a variety of soil types and acidities, but it requires at least seasonally moist soil. Vines can grow in full-sun to heavily shaded conditions. In mild areas of its range where year-round moisture is available, vines are perennial. In cold winter areas, vines die back in fall. In areas with seasonal wetness, vines emerge at the beginning of the wet season and die back completely in the dry season.

== Uses ==
All parts of the plant have a bitter taste (this is the meaning of the genus name Marah, which comes from Hebrew). The fruit is inedible. Some Native Americans may have consumed the seeds to commit suicide. The large tuber of the manroot can be processed for a soap-like extract.

=== Medicinal uses ===
Marah oregana was used by the Native Americans for various health problems. The Chinook made a poultice from the gourd. The Squaxin mashed the upper stalk in water to dip aching hands. The Chehalis people burned the root and mixed the resulting powder with bear grease to apply to scrofula sores. The Coast Salish made a decoction to treat venereal disease, kidney trouble and scrofula sores.

== Toxicity ==
The leaves and fruit contain high concentrations of tetracyclic triterpenoid compounds known as cucurbitacins. They impart a bitter flavor which serve as a natural pest deterrent. When ingested they can lead to various degrees of gastrointestinal upset and dehydration. Although data for this specific variety of wild cucumber is limited, case reports of ingestion of other species within the Cucurbitaceae family have been found to induce severe illness requiring intensive care support to treat dehydration from the profound gastrointestinal distress. There is no specific antidote.

These compounds have also been reported to induce delayed alopecia although the mechanism is unknown.

== Gallery ==
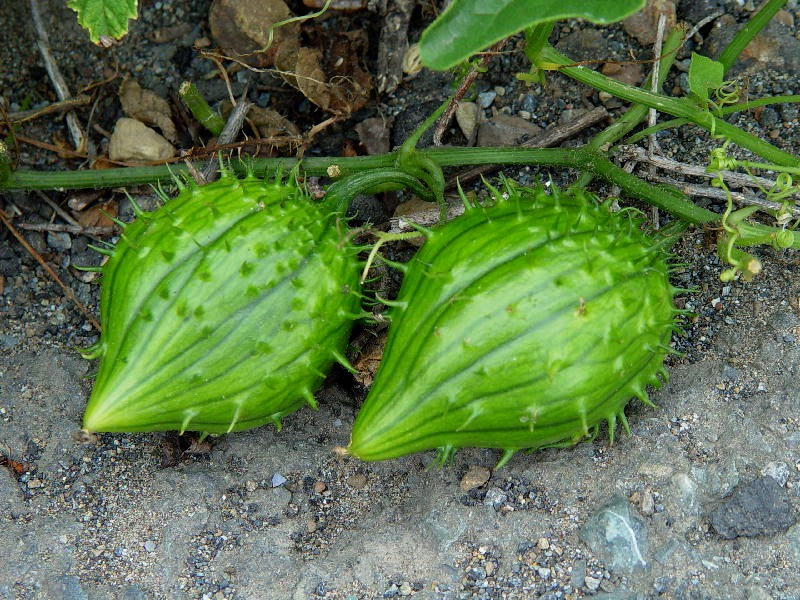
Fruits

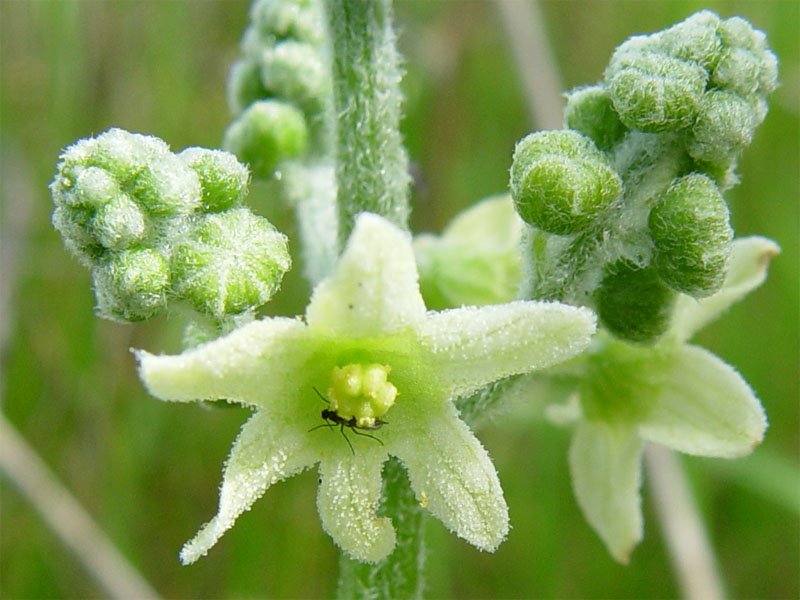
Flower

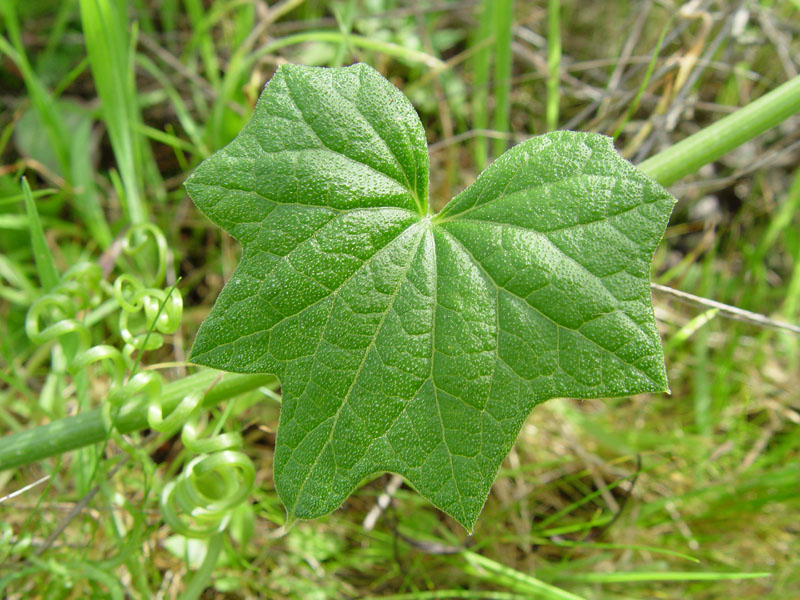
Leaf

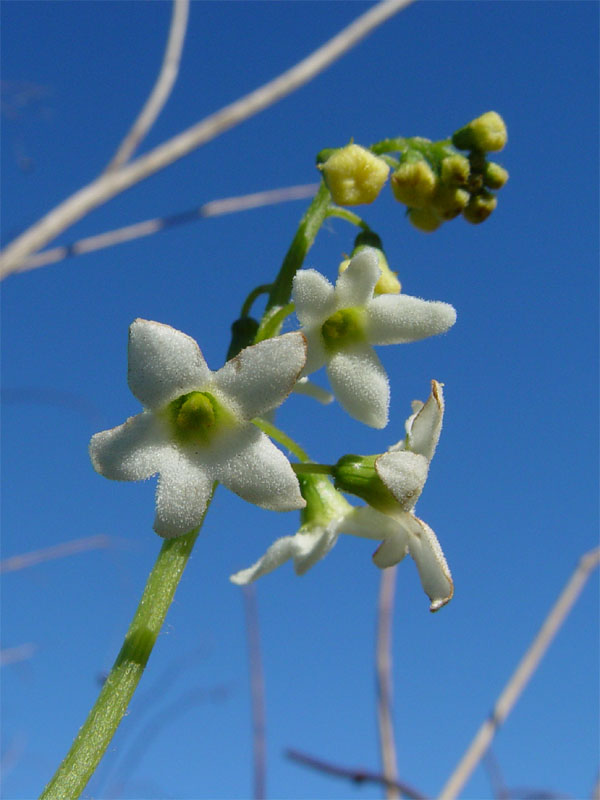
Flowers
