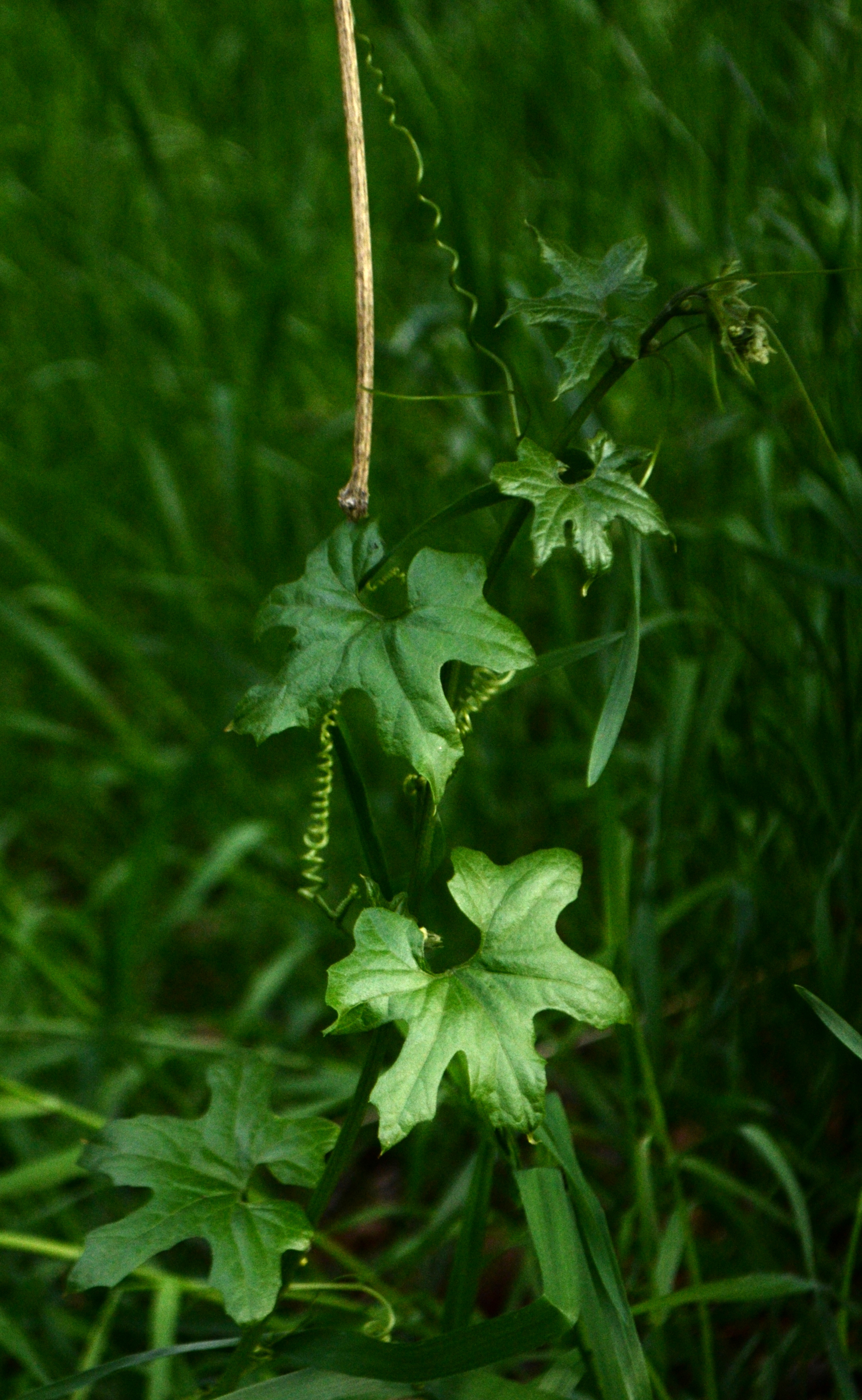

Scientific classification
- Kingdom: Plantae
- Clade: Tracheophytes
- Clade: Angiosperms
- Clade: Eudicots
- Clade: Rosids
- Order: Cucurbitales
- Family: Cucurbitaceae
- Genus: Marah
- Species: M. horrida

Binomial name
- Marah horrida (Congdon) Dunn

Synonyms
- Echinocystis horrida Congdon

= Marah horrida =

Species of flowering plant

Marah horrida, common name Sierra manroot, is a species of flowering plant in the family Cucurbitaceae, endemic to the foothills of the Sierra Nevada and the Tehachapi Mountains in California. It grows in open and shrubby areas below 1,000 m (3,300 ft) elevation.

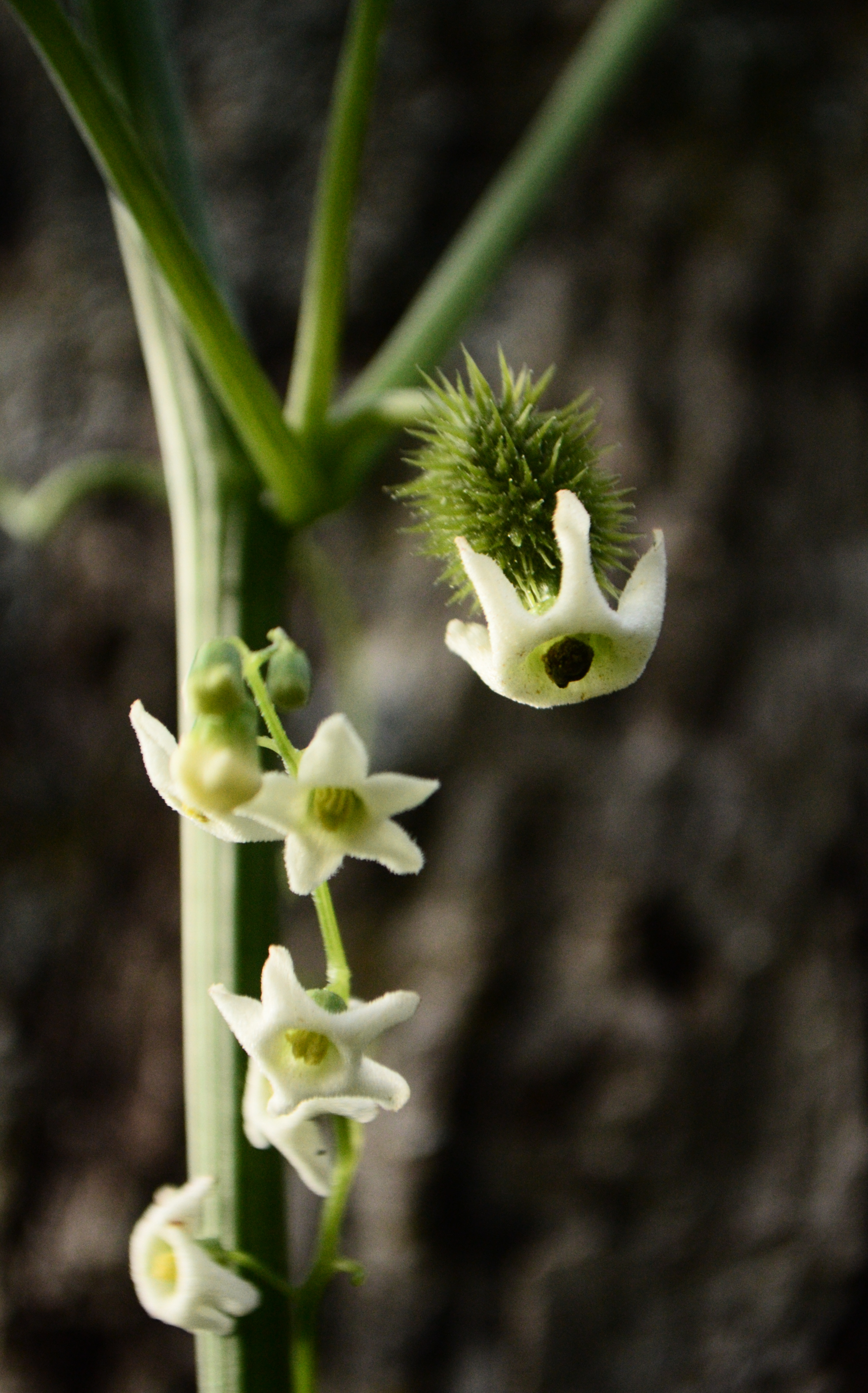
Flowers and developing fruit

== Description ==
Marah horrida is a perennial vine growing from a large, branched tuber. It produces a climbing stem with tendrils and many lobed, rounded leaves. The flowers are white. The fruit is an oblong, densely prickly capsule 9–20 cm (5–10 in) long, containing 6-24 seeds, each 26–32 mm (1.0–1.3 in) long.
