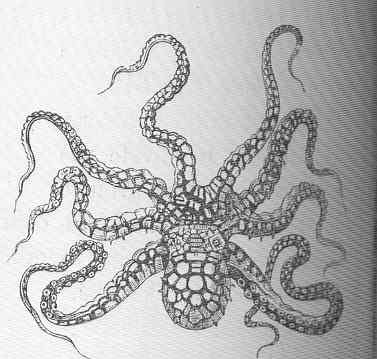

Conservation status
- Data Deficient (IUCN 3.1)

Scientific classification
- Kingdom: Animalia
- Phylum: Mollusca
- Class: Cephalopoda
- Order: Octopoda
- Family: Octopodidae
- Genus: Abdopus
- Species: A. horridus

Binomial name
- Abdopus horridus (d'Orbigny, 1826)

Synonyms
- Octopus horridus d'Orbigny, 1826; Octopus fimbriatus Rüppell, 1841

= Abdopus horridus =

Species of octopus

Abdopus horridus, the Red Sea octopus or common reef octopus, is a species of octopus in the genus Abdopus from the western Indian Ocean. It occurs in the western Indian Ocean and the Red Sea. It has a small body and long arms with a complex skin sculpture and pigmentation pattern on the body which it uses to camouflage itself. If a predator attacks this species it is capable of autotomising its arms, once autotomisised the arm can grow back in 2–3 months. Abdopus horridus is the type species of its genus but within that genus it is rather distinct and lays larger eggs than its congeners, many of which were previously thought to be populations of this species under its synonym Octopus horridus.
