= Horridus (disambiguation) =

Horridus is a superheroine in The Savage Dragon comics series.

Horridus may also refer to:

- Triceratops horridus, a dinosaur species
- Crotalus horridus, the scientific name for the timber rattlesnake
