= Hepatopancreatic parvovirus =

Grouping of viruses

Hepatopancreatic parvoviruses (HPV) are viruses with single-stranded DNA genomes that are in the family Parvoviridae, and which infect shrimp, prawn and other crustaceans. HPV infects the epithelial cells of the host's hepatopancreas and midgut, leading to stunted growth at the early life stage. For shrimp farms, especially in Asian countries such as China, India and Indonesia, HPV can lead to economic losses in aquaculture due to the reduced production.

== Virology ==
Hepatopancreatic parvoviruses (HPV) are icosahedral particles with an average 22 nm diameter, whose genomes consist of negative single-stranded DNA molecules. Four complete genome sequences of HPV are available to date: Thailand (Penaeus monodon densovirus (PmoDNV)), Australia (Penaeus merguiensis densovirus (PmeDNV)), India (Penaeus monodon densovirus (PmoDNV) and South Korea (F. chinensis hepatopancreatic densovirus (FcDNV)).

Different strains of HPV show genetic variance, isolated by shrimp species and/or geographical regions. For example, there is a 10% sequence variation between South Korean and Chinese stains, which can be explained by the hosts' adaption to different spatial conditions in the two countries.

== Pathology ==
HPV is known to infect ten species of shrimp and freshwater prawns including Penaeus vannamei, Penaeus semisulcatus, Penaeus chinensis, Penaeus setosus, Penaeus monodon, Penaeus indicus, Penaeus cyaneus, and Penaeus japonicus. The virus infects shrimp at an early stage of growth. It causes stunted growth, stopping growth when the shrimp reaches about 6 centimeters in length. HPV infects the epithelial cells of the shrimp's hepatopancreas and midgut. This results in hepatopancreatic atrophy, low growth rates, loss of appetite, reduced pre-hatching, and an increase in ectoparasites on the body surface and gills. HPV can cause mortality in epizootics in P. merguiensis and P. semisulcatus after 4-8 weeks, with a mortality rate of 50-100%.

== Epidemiology ==
Hepatopancreatic parvovirus (HPV) has been found to be widely distributed in wild, cultured and hatchery reared shrimps throughout the world including Australia, China, Korea, Taiwan, the Philippines, Indonesia, Malaysia, Singapore, Kenya, Israel, Kuwait, North and South America and India.

The first case of HPV was reported in 1982 by a commercial farm in Singapore where reports of increased mortalities in early larval and post larval stages of the Banana Prawn, Penaeus merguiensis, and stunted growth in juveniles were found. Individual shrimp with the HPV infection displayed nonspecific signs during the juvenile stages, including poor growth rate, anorexia, reduced preening activity, increased surface fouling, and occasional opacity of tail musculature. These signs were accompanied by mortalities, which reached up to 50-100% of an affected population of P. merguiensis within 4-8 weeks of disease onset.

Soon after, cultured populations of four shrimp species from four separate culture facilities in Asia were found to be adversely affected by a disease of presumed viral etiology. In 1984, samples of P. esculentus from Moreton Bay and the Gulf of Carpentaria of Australia were reported to show similar signs of the virus.

In 1987, the importation of live Asian shrimp for aquaculture subsequently spread the disease to wild shrimp in North and South America. In 1995, a new strain of HPV (HPVchin) was reported to be found in P. chinensis in Korea which then was then introduced into Hawaii after the importation of infected shrimp. In 1992, HPV infection in the black tiger shrimp (P. monodon) was first reported from Thailand which then was reported in India by 2002. Wild stocks of P. semisulcatus were reported with the infection in 2005 in India. Additional strains of HPV have been documented in P. monodon from India, Madagascar, New Caledonia and Tanzania and in P. chinensis from South Korea and China.

== Transmission ==
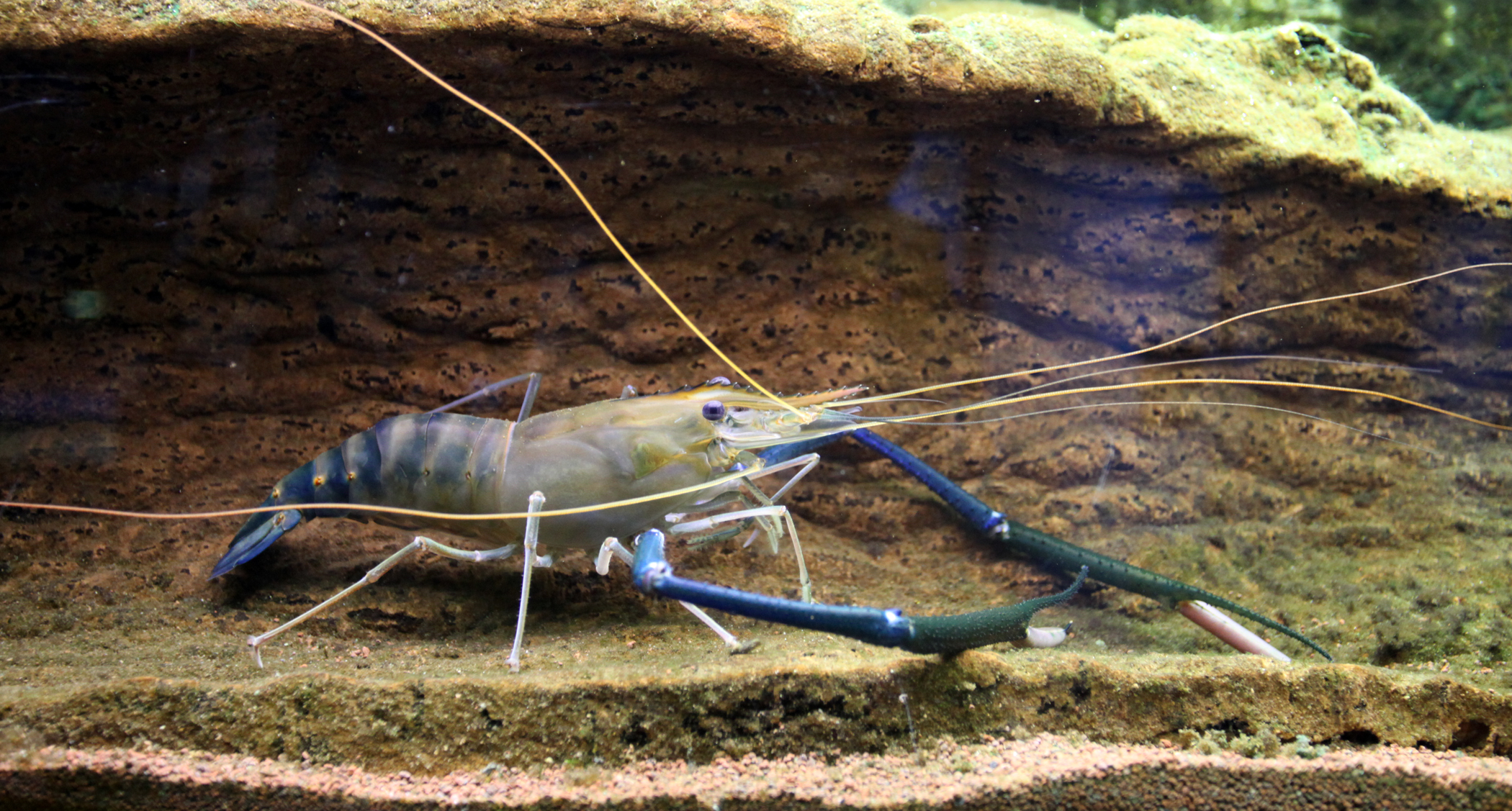
A giant freshwater prawn (Macrobrachium rosenbergii) in the water tank.

The natural host range of HPV includes a number of cultured and captured shrimp species from all around the world, including Penaeus merguiensis, Penaeus semisulcatus, Penaeus chinensis (=orientalis), Penaeus esculentus, Penaeus monodon, Penaeus indicus, Penaeus penicillatus, Penaeus japonicus, Penaeus stylirostris and Penaeus vannamei. A HPV-like agent was found in Macrobrachium rosenbergii. To date, ten strains of HPV have been described. HPV is observed to transmit vertically and horizontally. Feeding experiments show that P. monodon post-larvae can be infected by the HPV carried by Artemia, which implies the risk of rearing system contamination. Parents-offspring transmissions are both reported by aquaculture farms in China and India, confirming the vertical transmission of HPV.

HPV first attaches to the microvilli of host cells and then enters them through pinocytosis. Parvovirus particles can infected by exposure to infected water or by cannibalism of tissues of infected hosts. Cannibalism is ordinary among crustacean species and can intensify as the pressure increases in the communities, such as high density, low oxygen, and low food availability, which are commonly found in shrimp farms.

== Treatment and control ==
Currently, there are no targeted antiviral therapies or vaccines for HPV, underscoring the continued importance of preventive measures in mitigating outbreaks of the disease.

Therefore, prioritizing research into the prevention and management of HPV infections is crucial. Additionally, advancing studies on viral proteins and their functions in replication should serve as the cornerstone for future investigations in this field. Maintaining optimal water quality parameters, such as temperature, pH, and dissolved oxygen levels, to reduce stress on shrimp and support their immune system function.

== Evolution ==
HPV has been found to have greater genetic diversity than other shrimp viruses. The variation in HPV is a reflection of its wide geographic distribution, as it has been found in samples of penaeid shrimp collected from Africa, Australia, and Asia.

The genetic variation among geographic isolates of HPV can be divided into 4 well-separated genotypes: Tanzania, Korea, Thailand, and Australia. Isolates from Tanzania and Madagascar form one subclade, Thailand, Indonesia, and India form the second subclade, Australia and New Caledonia form the third, and Korea and China form the forth subclade. The viral etiology of HPV varies amongst shrimp. HPV has been linked to growth reduction of farmed P. monodon in Thailand; however, in Madagascar, HPV infection appears to have no negative effect on shrimp growth. It is speculated that the different effects may be related to differences among viral genotypes, host populations and/or farming practices.

== Economic impact ==
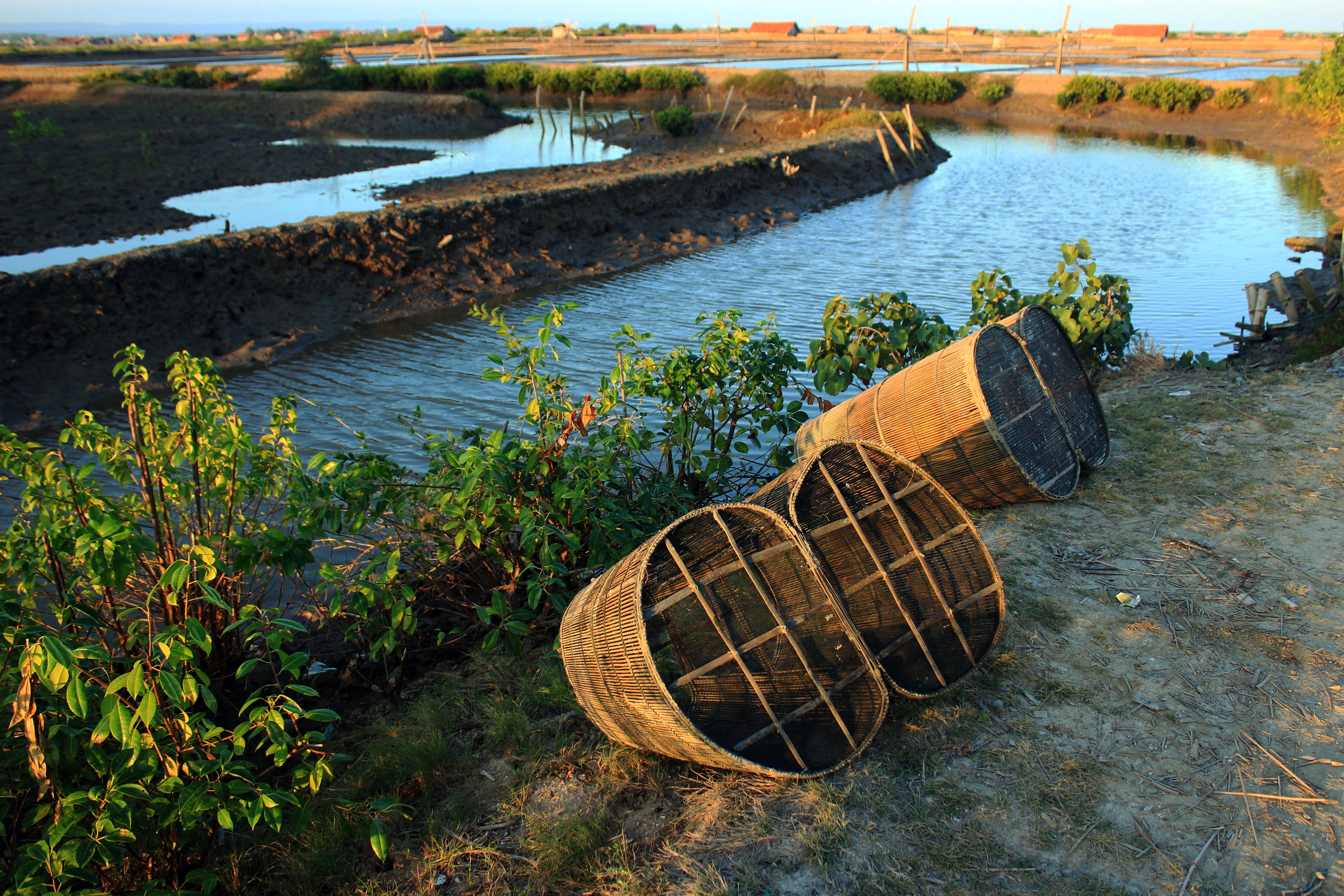
A shrimp farm in Madura, Indonesia.

HPV poses environmental and economical challenges in the aquaculture industry. Aquaculture is one of the fastest growing food producing sectors in the world where the reported global production of food from aquaculture comprised 87.5 million tonnes of aquatic animals mostly for use as human food. Shrimp farming has rapidly expanded in Asia and generated substantial income for farmers in many developing countries. The increased occurrence of devastating viral diseases in shrimp culture systems threatens the sustainability of both the aquaculture industry and the commercial shrimp fishery.

HPV is associated with reduced growth rates of juvenile shrimp without showing any gross signs of disease and can lead to mass mortalities in shrimp populations. Therefore, outbreaks can result in substantial losses for shrimp farmers due to decreased yields, increased mortality rates, and costly disease management measures such as quarantine protocols and treatment regimens. These impacts reverberate through the entire aquaculture supply chain, affecting livelihoods and food security in regions dependent on shrimp farming. In India, the shrimp aquaculture industry started only during the mid-eighties, flourished well and proved lucrative initially until the sector was affected by diseases. Ecologically, infected shrimp may shed the virus into surrounding waters, potentially spreading the disease to wild crustacean populations.
