= Marine shrimp farming =

Aquaculture of shrimp or prawns

Marine shrimp farming

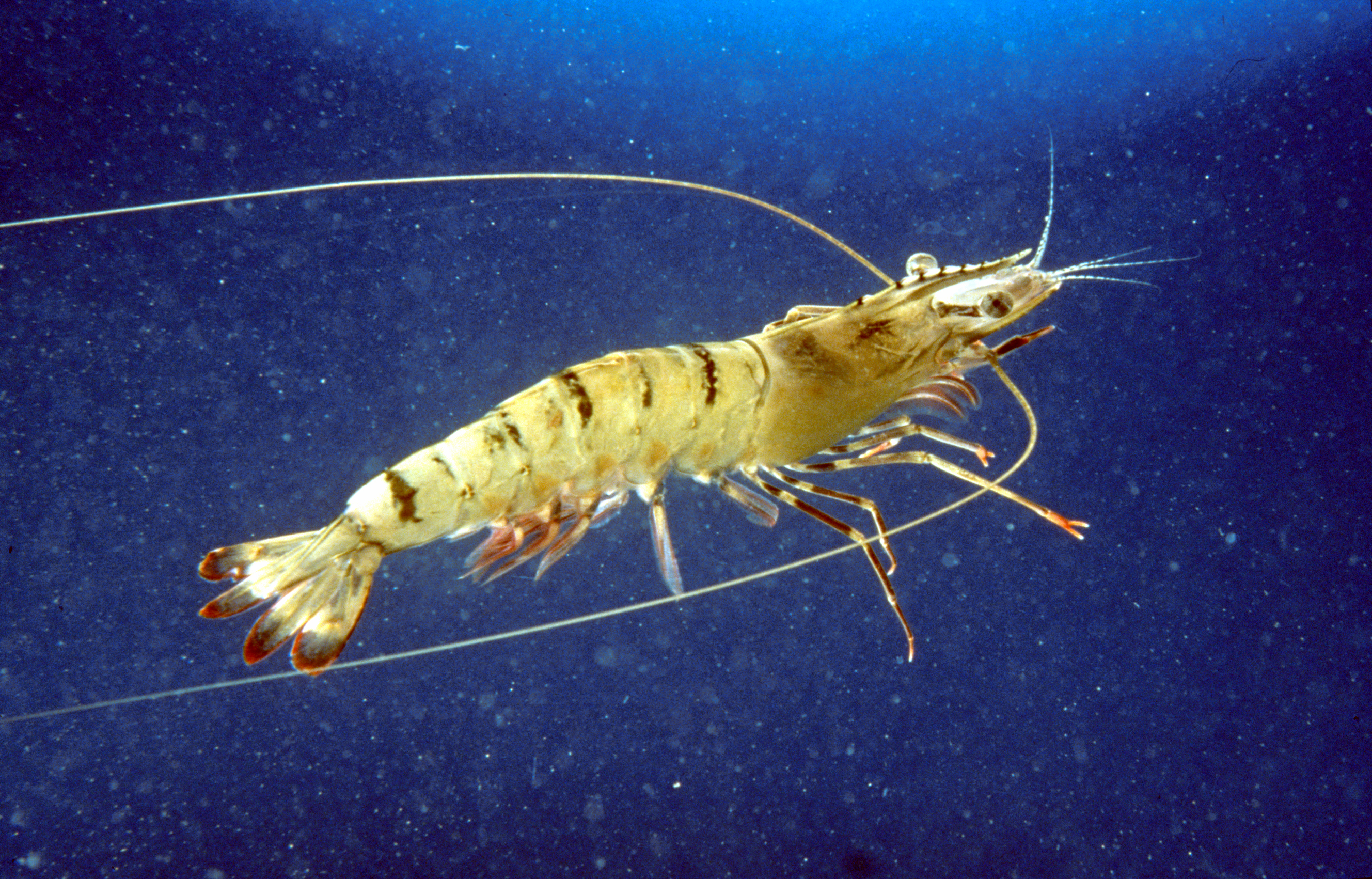
Giant tiger prawn

Marine shrimp farming is an aquaculture business for the cultivation of marine shrimp or prawns (Note: The terminology is sometimes confusing as the distinction between "shrimp" and "prawn" is often blurred. The FAO, for instance, calls P. monodon the "Giant Tiger Prawn", but P. vannamei the "Whiteleg Shrimp". Recent aquaculture literature increasingly uses the term "prawn" only for the freshwater forms of palaemonids and "shrimp" for the marine penaeids.) for human consumption. Although traditional shrimp farming has been carried out in Asia for centuries, large-scale commercial shrimp farming began in the 1970s, and production grew steeply, particularly to match the market demands of the United States, Japan and Western Europe. The total global production of farmed shrimp reached more than 1.6 million tonnes in 2003, representing a value of nearly 9 billion U.S. dollars. About 75% of farmed shrimp is produced in Asia, particularly in China and Thailand. The other 25% is produced mainly in Latin America, where Brazil, Ecuador, and Mexico are the largest producers. The largest exporting nation is Thailand.

Shrimp farming has changed from traditional, small-scale businesses in Southeast Asia into a global industry. Technological advances have led to higher densities of shrimp, and broodstock is shipped worldwide. Virtually all farmed shrimp are of the family Penaeidae, and just two species – Penaeus vannamei (Pacific white shrimp) and Penaeus monodon (giant tiger prawn) – account for roughly 80% of all farmed shrimp. These industrial monocultures are very susceptible to diseases, which have caused several regional wipe-outs of farm shrimp populations. Increasing ecological problems, repeated disease outbreaks, and pressure and criticism from both NGOs and consumer countries led to changes in the industry in the late 1990s and generally stronger regulation by governments. In 1999, a program aimed at developing and promoting more sustainable farming practices was initiated, including governmental bodies, industry representatives, and environmental organizations.

== History and geography ==
Shrimp has been farmed in Southeast Asia and China for centuries, using traditional low-density methods. In Indonesia, the use of brackish water ponds (tambaks) can be traced back as far as the 15th century. They used small scale ponds for monoculture or polycultured with other species, such as milkfish, or in rotation with rice, using the rice paddies for shrimp cultures during the dry season when no rice could be grown. Such cultures often were in coastal areas or on river banks. Mangrove areas were favored because of their abundant natural shrimp. Wild juvenile shrimp were trapped in ponds and reared on naturally occurring organisms in the water until they reached the desired size for harvesting.

Industrial shrimp farming can be traced to the 1930s, when Japanese agrarians spawned and cultivated Kuruma shrimp (Penaeus japonicus) for the first time. By the 1960s, a small industry had developed in Japan. Commercial shrimp farming began to grow rapidly in the late 1960s and early 1970s.

Shrimp farming was first carried out in Latin America in 1969 in Guaymas, Mexico, by María Concepción Rodríguez de la Cruz. In Mexico, shrimp farming was practiced for non-commercial purposes at the National Fisheries Institute, at the Scientific and Technical Research Center of the University of Sonora (CICTUS), and in Puerto Peñasco. The practice was implemented commercially in Mexico in 1985.

Worldwide, technological advances led to more intensive forms of farming, and growing market demand led to worldwide proliferation of shrimp farms, concentrated in tropical and subtropical regions. Growing consumer demand in the early 1980s coincided with faltering wild catches, creating a booming industry. Taiwan was an early adopter and a major producer in the 1980s; its production collapsed beginning in 1988 due to poor management practices and disease. In Thailand, large-scale production expanded rapidly from 1985. In South America, Ecuador lead shrimp farming, where it expanded dramatically from 1978. Brazil had been active in shrimp farming since 1974, but trade boomed there only in the 1990s, making the country a major producer within a few years. Today, there are marine shrimp farms in over fifty countries.

== Farming methods ==
When shrimp farming emerged to satisfy demand that had surpassed the wild fisheries' capacity, the subsistence farming methods of old were rapidly replaced by the more productive practices required to serve a global market. Industrial farming at first followed traditional methods, with so-called "extensive" farms, compensating for low density with increased pond sizes; instead of ponds of just a few hectares, ponds of sizes up to 100 hectares (1.0 km^{2}) were used and huge areas of mangroves were cleared in some areas. Technological advances made more intensive practices possible that increase yield per area, helping reduce pressure to convert more land. Semi-intensive and intensive farms appeared, where the shrimp were reared on artificial feeds and ponds were actively managed. Although many extensive farms remain, new farms typically are of the semi-intensive kind.

Until the mid-1980s, most farms were stocked with young wild animals, called 'postlarvae', typically caught locally. Postlarvae fishing became an important economic sector in many countries. To counteract the depletion of fishing grounds and to ensure a steady supply of young shrimp, the industry started breeding shrimp in hatcheries.

=== Life cycle ===
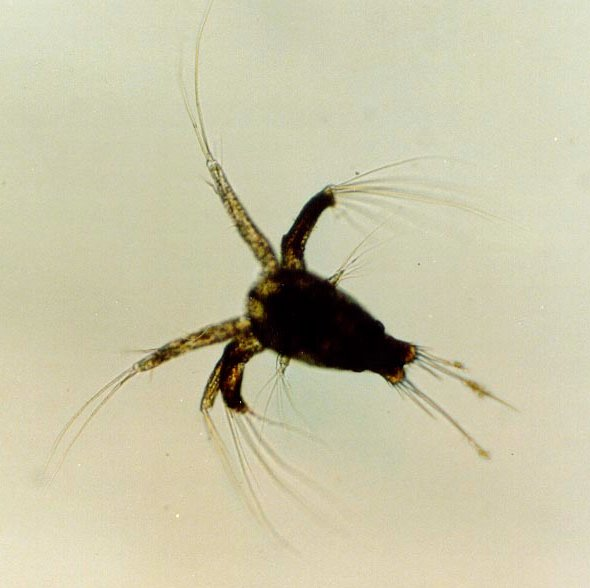
A nauplius of a shrimp

Shrimp mature and breed only in a marine habitat. The females lay 100,000 to 500,000 eggs, which hatch after some 24 hours into tiny nauplii. These nauplii feed on yolk reserves within their bodies, and then metamorphose into zoeae. Shrimp in this second larval stage feed in the wild on algae, and after a few days, morph again into mysis larvae. The mysis larvae or myses look akin to tiny shrimp, and feed on algae and zooplankton. After another three to four days, they metamorphose a final time into postlarvae: young shrimp that have adult characteristics. The whole process takes about 12 days from hatching. In the wild, postlarvae then migrate into estuaries, which are rich in nutrients and low in salinity. They migrate back into open waters when they mature.

=== Supply chain ===
In shrimp farming, this life cycle occurs under controlled conditions. The reasons to do so include more intensive farming, improved size control resulting in more uniformly sized shrimp, and better predator control, but also the ability to accelerate growth and maturation by controlling the climate (especially in farms in the temperate zones, using greenhouses). There are three different stages:

- Hatcheries breed shrimp and produce nauplii or even postlarvae, which they sell to farms. Large shrimp farms maintain their own hatcheries and sell nauplii or postlarvae to smaller farms in the region.
- Nurseries grow postlarvae and accustom them to the marine conditions in the grow-out ponds.
- In the grow-out ponds the shrimp are grown from juveniles to marketable size, which takes between three and six months.

Most farms produce one to two harvests a year; in tropical climates, even three are possible. Because of the need for salt water, shrimp farms are located on or near a coast. Inland shrimp farms have also been tried in some regions, but the need to ship salt water and competition for land with agricultural users led to problems. Thailand banned inland shrimp farms in 1999.

==== Hatcheries ====
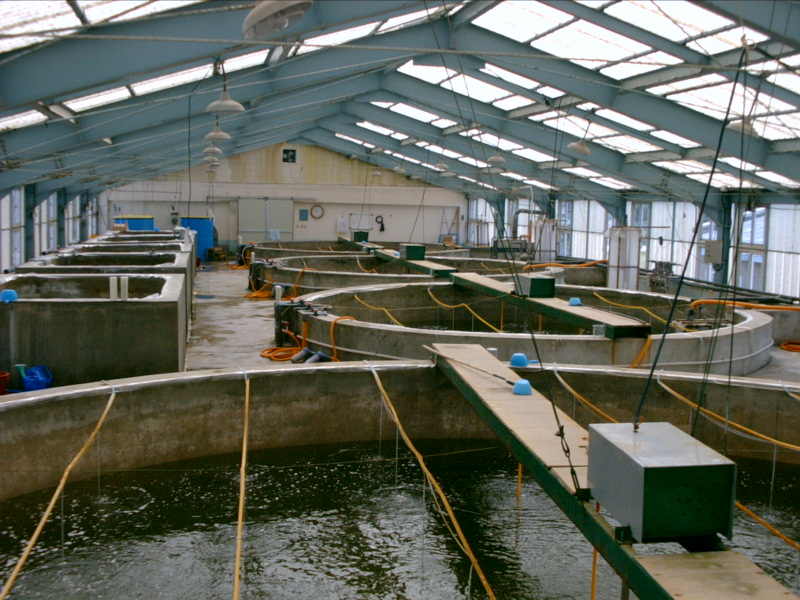
Tanks in a shrimp hatchery

Small-scale hatcheries are very common throughout Southeast Asia. Often run as family businesses and using a low-technology approach, they use small tanks (less than ten tons) and often low animal densities. They are susceptible to disease, but due to their small size, they can typically restart production quickly after disinfection. The survival rate is anywhere between zero and 90%, depending on a wide range of factors, including disease, the weather, and the experience of the operator.

Greenwater hatcheries are medium-sized hatcheries using large tanks with low animal densities. To feed the shrimp larvae, an algal bloom is induced in the tanks. The survival rate is about 40%.

Galveston hatcheries (named after Galveston, Texas, where they were developed) are large-scale, industrial hatcheries using a closed and tightly controlled environment. They breed the shrimp at high densities in large (15–30 t) tanks. Survival rates vary between 0% and 80%, but typically achieve 50%.

In hatcheries, the developing shrimp are fed on a diet of algae and later also brine shrimp nauplii, sometimes (especially in industrial hatcheries) augmented by artificial diets. The diet of later stages also includes fresh or freeze-dried animal protein, for example krill. Nutrition and medication (such as antibiotics) fed to the brine shrimp nauplii are passed on to the shrimp that eat them.

==== Nurseries ====
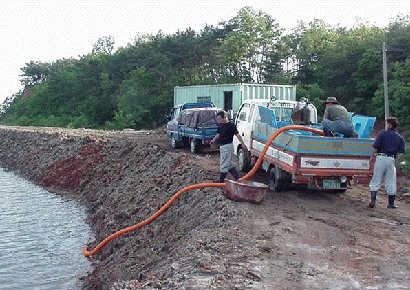
Farmers transferring postlarvae from the tanks on the truck to a grow-out pond

Many farms have nurseries where the postlarval shrimp are grown into juveniles for another three weeks in separate ponds, tanks, or so-called raceways. A raceway is a rectangular, long, shallow tank through which water flows continuously.

In a typical nursery, there are 150 to 200 animals per square metre. They are fed on a high-protein diet for at most three weeks before they are moved to the grow-out ponds. At that time, they weigh between one and two grams. The water salinity is adjusted gradually to that of the grow-out ponds.

Farmers refer to postlarvae as "PLs", with the number of days suffixed (i.e., PL-1, PL-2, etc.). They are ready to be transferred to the grow-out ponds after their gills have branched, which occurs around PL-13 to PL-17 (about 25 days after hatching). Nursing is not absolutely necessary, but is favoured by many farms because it makes for better food utilization, improves the size uniformity, helps use the infrastructure better, and can be done in a controlled environment to increase the harvest. The main disadvantage of nurseries is that some of the postlarval shrimp die upon the transfer to the grow-out pond.

Some farms do not use a nursery, but stock the postlarvae directly in the grow-out ponds after having acclimated them to the appropriate temperature and salinity levels in an acclimation tank. Over the course of a few days, the water in these tanks is changed gradually to match that of the grow-out ponds. The animal density should not exceed 500/litre for young postlarvae and 50/liter for larger ones, such as PL-15.

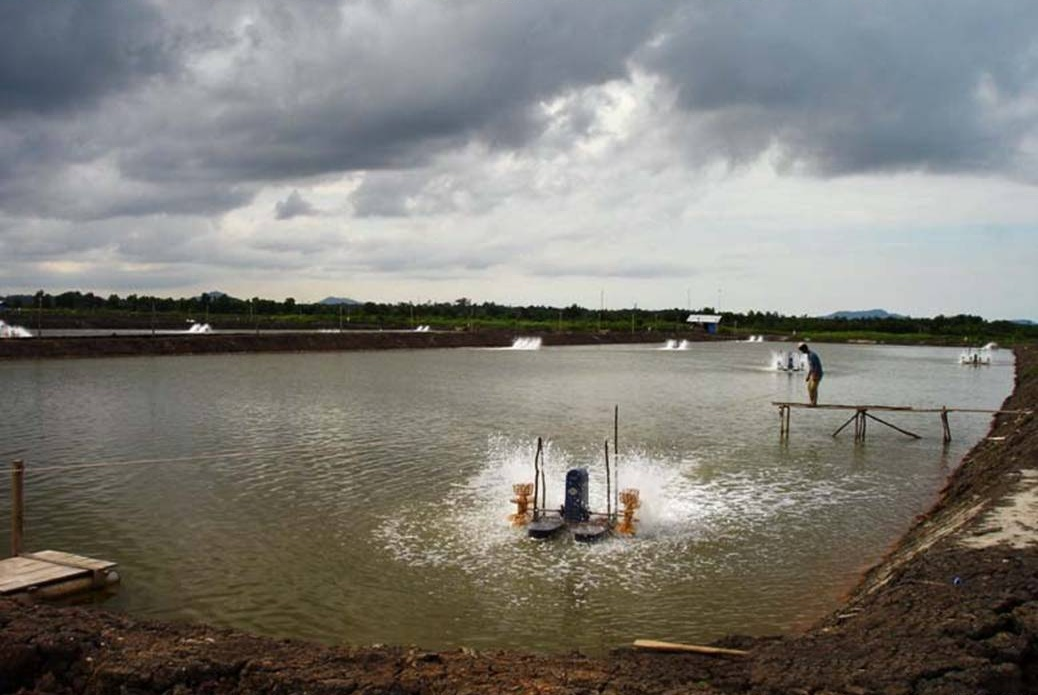
Shrimp pond with paddlewheel aerators in Indonesia. The pond is in an early stage of cultivation; plankton has been seeded and grown (whence the greenish color of the water); shrimp postlarvae are to be released next.

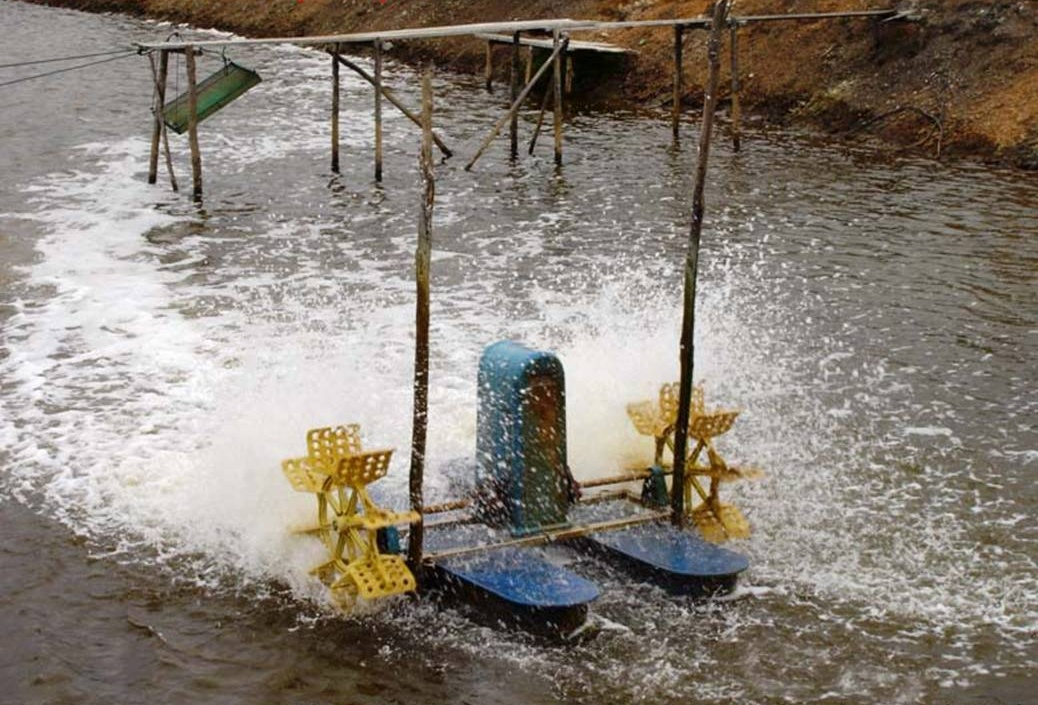
A one-horsepower paddlewheel aerator. The splashing may increase the evaporation rate of the water and thus increase the salinity of the pond.

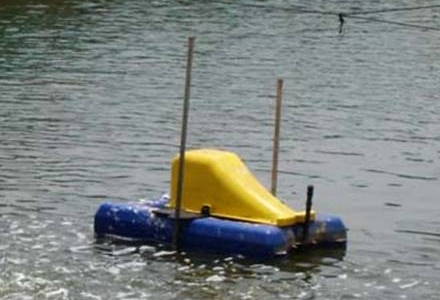
The intake of a two-horsepower "turbo aerator", which paddles one meter below the water surface. To avoid stirring up pond sediments, the water depth should be at least 1.5 m.

==== Grow-out ====
In the grow-out phase, the shrimp are grown to maturity. The postlarvae are transferred to ponds where they are fed until they reach marketable size, which takes about another three to six months. Harvesting the shrimp is done by fishing them from the ponds using nets or by draining the ponds. Pond sizes and the level of technical infrastructure vary.

Extensive shrimp farms using traditional low-density methods are invariably located on a coast and often in mangrove areas. The ponds range from just a few to more than 100 hectares; shrimp are stocked at low densities (2–3 animals per square metre, or 25,000/ha). (Note: Since adult shrimp are bottom dwellers, stocking densities in ponds are usually given per area, not per water volume.) The tides provide for some water exchange, and the shrimp feed on naturally occurring organisms. In some areas, farmers even grow wild shrimp by just opening the gates and impounding wild larvae. Prevalent in poorer or less developed countries where land prices are low, extensive farms produce annual yields from 50 to 500 kg/ha of shrimp (head-on weight). They have low production costs (US$1–3/kg live shrimp), are not very labor-intensive, and do not require advanced technical skills.

Semi-intensive farms do not rely on tides for water exchange, but use pumps and a planned pond layout. They can therefore be built above the high tide line. Pond sizes range from 2 to 30 ha; the stocking densities range from 10 to 30/square meter (100,000–300,000/ha). At such densities, artificial feeding using industrially prepared shrimp feeds and fertilizing the pond to stimulate the growth of naturally occurring organisms become a necessity. Annual yields range from 500 to 5,000 kg/ha, while production costs are in the range of US$2–6/kg live shrimp. With densities above 15 animals per square meter, aeration is often required to prevent oxygen depletion. Productivity varies depending upon water temperature, thus it is common to have larger sized shrimp in some seasons than in others.

Intensive farms use even smaller ponds (0.1–1.5 hectares or 0.25–3.71 acres) and even higher stocking densities. The ponds are actively managed: they are aerated, there is a high water exchange to remove waste products and maintain water quality, and the shrimp are fed on specially designed diets, typically in the form of formulated pellets. Such farms produce annual yields between 5,000 and 20,000 kg/ha; a few super-intensive farms can produce as much as 100,000 kg/ha. They require an advanced technical infrastructure and highly trained professionals for constant monitoring of water quality and other pond conditions; their production costs are in the range of US$4–8/kg live shrimp.

Estimates on the production characteristics of shrimp farms vary. Most studies agree that about 15-20% of all shrimp farms worldwide are extensive farms, another 25–30% are semi-intensive, and the rest are intensive farms. Regional variation is high, though, and Tacon reports wide discrepancies in the percentages claimed for individual countries by different studies.

=== Animal welfare ===
Eyestalk ablation is the removal of one (unilateral) or both (bilateral) eyestalks from a crustacean. It is routinely practiced on female shrimps (or prawns) in almost every marine shrimp maturation or reproduction facility in the world, but has faced increasing criticism in recent years. The aim of ablation is to stimulate the female shrimp to develop mature ovaries and spawn.

Poor captive conditions for shrimp cause inhibitions in females that prevent them from developing mature ovaries. Even in conditions where a given species will develop ovaries and spawn in captivity, use of eyestalk ablation increases total egg production and increases the percentage of females in a given population that will participate in reproduction. Once females have been subjected to eyestalk ablation, complete ovarian development often ensues within as little as 3 to 10 days.

Eyestalk ablation has faced criticism from animal welfare advocates. Alternatives such as higher quality feed, and maintaining a 2:1 sex ratio of female to male shrimp within tanks have been found effective, but are not yet widespread.

=== Slaughter methods ===
Shrimp are commonly slaughtered using the ice slurry method, in which they are immersed in a mixture of ice and water with the aim of inducing thermal shock. However, animal welfare organizations have raised concerns that this method is often ineffective, leading instead to death by asphyxiation and prolonged suffering. In response to growing ethical concerns, more humane alternatives have been explored. Electrical stunning is currently considered the most humane pre-slaughter method available for shrimp, as it renders them unconscious significantly faster and more effectively than ice slurry or asphyxiation. In 2022, the United Kingdom legally recognized decapod crustaceans, including shrimp, as sentient beings capable of experiencing pain, further reinforcing the need for improved welfare practices during slaughter.

=== Animal welfare initiatives in shrimp farming ===
In recent years, animal welfare groups have intensified their campaigns to improve shrimp farming standards. Mercy for Animals led the world's first public demonstration for shrimp welfare, prompting Tesco in 2024 to commit to banning eyestalk ablation and ice-slurry stunning, replacing them with 100% electrical stunning for key species, Penaeus vannamei and Penaeus monodon, by 2027. The UK-based Shrimp Welfare Project supports humane slaughter practices globally by providing free electrical stunners to producers and encouraging broader adoption of electrical stunning alongside efforts to eliminate eyestalk ablation. Similarly, the International Council for Animal Welfare (ICAW) has urged retailers, including Tesco, Marks & Spencer, Sainsbury's, Ocado, Waitrose, and Co‑op, to end ice-slurry slaughter and eyestalk ablation and to implement electrical stunning in their supply chains.

=== Feeding ===
While extensive farms mainly rely on the natural productivity of the ponds, more intensively managed farms rely on artificial shrimp feeds, either exclusively or as a supplement to the organisms that naturally occur in a pond. A food chain is established in the ponds, based on the growth of phytoplankton. Fertilizers and mineral conditioners are used to boost the growth of the phytoplankton to accelerate the growth of the shrimp. Waste from the artificial food pellets and shrimp excrement can lead to the eutrophication of the ponds.

Artificial feeds come in the form of specially formulated, granulated pellets that disintegrate quickly. Up to 70% of such pellets are wasted, as they decay before the shrimp have eaten them. They are fed two to five times daily; the feeding can be done manually either from ashore or from boats, or using mechanized feeders distributed all over a pond. The feed conversion rate (FCR), i.e. the amount of food needed to produce a unit (e.g. one kilogram) of shrimp, is claimed by the industry to be around 1.2–2.0 in modern farms, but this is an optimum value that is not always attained in practice. For a farm to be profitable, a feed conversion rate below 2.5 is necessary; in older farms or under suboptimal pond conditions, the ratio may easily rise to 4:1. Lower FCRs result in a higher profit for the farm.

== Farmed species ==
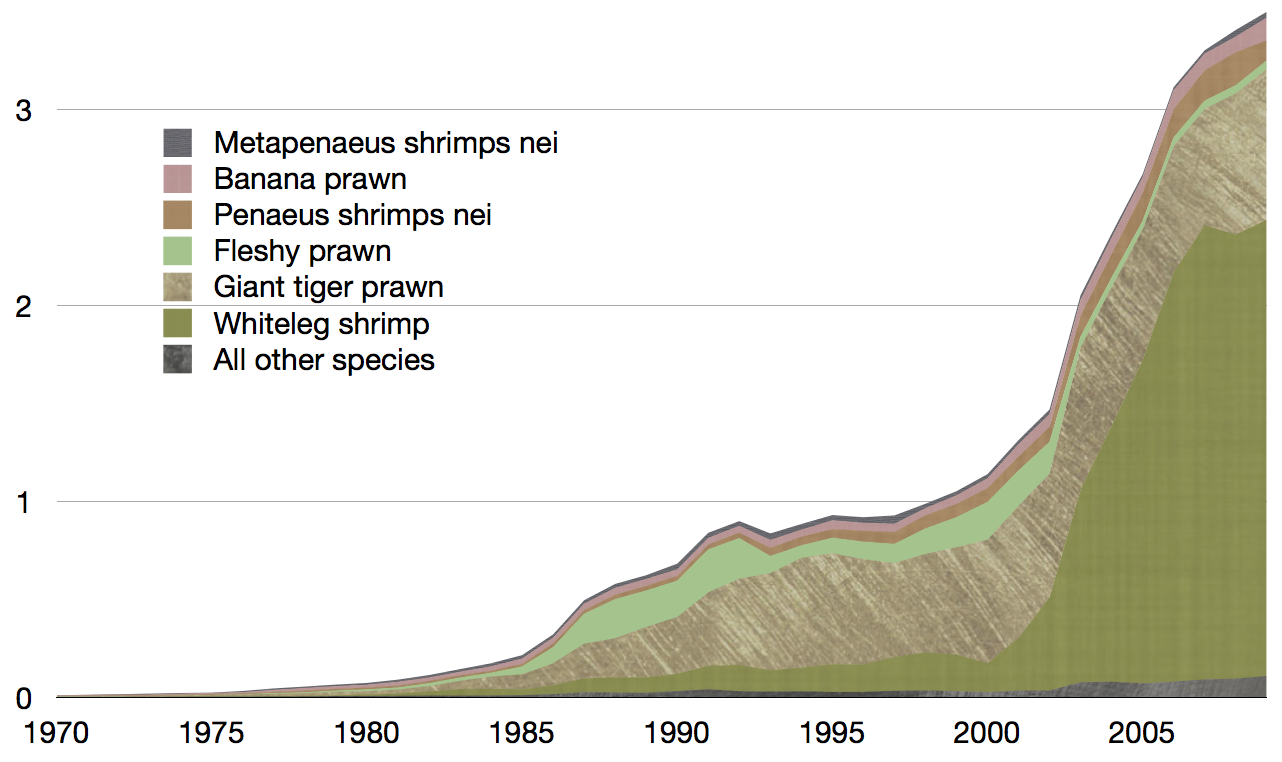
Global aquaculture of shrimp and prawn species in million tonnes, 1970–2009, as reported by the FAO

Although there are many species of shrimp and prawn, only a few of the larger ones are actually cultivated, all of which belong to the family of penaeids (family Penaeidae), and within it to the genus Penaeus. (Note: The taxonomy of the whole genus Penaeus is in flux. Pérez Farfante and Kensley have proposed a subdivision or reassignment of several species in this genus to new genera based on morphological differences, in particular their genital characteristics. See Penaeus for more information. As a consequence, some of the farmed species are also known under names using the genera Litopenaeus, Farfantepenaeus, Fenneropenaeus, or Marsupenaeus instead of Penaeus. Penaeus vannamei, for instance, has become Litopenaeus vannamei.) Many species are unsuitable for farming: they are too small to be profitable, or simply stop growing when crowded together, or are too susceptible to diseases. The two species dominating the market are:

- Pacific white shrimp (Litopenaeus vannamei, also called "whiteleg shrimp") is the main species cultivated in western countries. Native to the Pacific coast from Mexico to Peru, it grows to a size of 23 cm. L. vannamei accounts for 95% of the production in Latin America. It is easy to breed in captivity, but succumbs to the Taura disease.
- Giant tiger prawn (P. monodon, also known as "black tiger shrimp") occurs in the wild in the Indian Ocean and in the Pacific Ocean from Japan to Australia. The largest of all the cultivated shrimp, it can grow to a length of 36 cm and is farmed in Asia. Because of its susceptibility to whitespot disease and the difficulty of breeding it in captivity, it is gradually being replaced by L. vannamei since 2001.

Together, these two species account for about 80% of the whole farmed shrimp production. Other species being bred are:

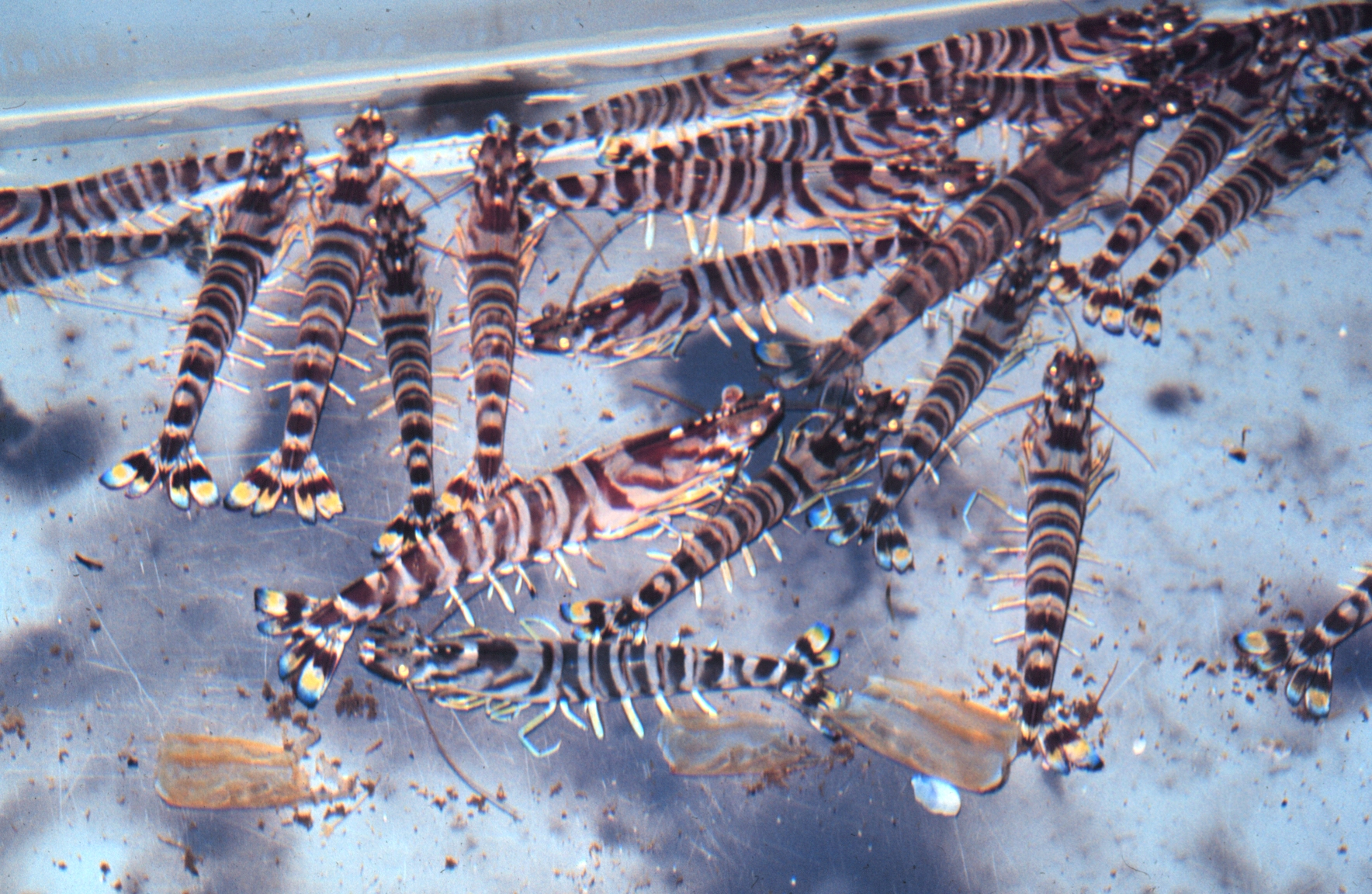
Marsupenaeus japonicus (kuruma shrimp) in an aquaculture observation tank in Taiwan

- Western blue shrimp (P. stylirostris) was a popular choice for shrimp farming in the western hemisphere, until the IHHN virus wiped out nearly the whole population in the late 1980s. A few stocks survived and became resistant against this virus. When it was discovered that some of these were also resistant against the Taura virus, some farms again bred P. stylirostris from 1997 on.
- Chinese white shrimp (P. chinensis, also known as the fleshy prawn) occurs along the coast of China and the western coast of Korea and is being farmed in China. It grows to a maximum length of only 18 cm, but tolerates colder water (min. 16 °C). Once a major factor on the world market, it is today used almost exclusively for the Chinese domestic market after a disease wiped out nearly all the stocks in 1993.
- Kuruma shrimp (P. japonicus) is farmed primarily in Japan and Taiwan, but also in Australia; the only market is in Japan, where live Kuruma shrimp reach prices of the order of US$100 per pound ($220/kg).
- Indian white shrimp (P. indicus) is a native of the coasts of the Indian Ocean and is widely bred in India, Iran and the Middle East and along the African shores.
- Banana shrimp (P. merguiensis) is another cultured species from the coastal waters of the Indian Ocean, from Oman to Indonesia and Australia. It can be grown at high densities.

Several other species of Penaeus play only a very minor role in shrimp farming. Some other kinds of shrimp also can be farmed, e.g. the "Akiami paste shrimp" or Metapenaeus spp. Their total production from aquaculture is of the order of only about 25,000 tonnes per year, small in comparison to that of the penaeids.

== Diseases ==
There are a variety of lethal viral diseases that affect shrimp. In the densely populated, monocultural farms such virus infections spread rapidly and may wipe out whole shrimp populations. A major transfer vector of many of these viruses is the water itself; and thus any virus outbreak also carries the danger of decimating shrimp living in the wild.

Yellowhead disease, called Hua leung in Thai, affects P. monodon throughout Southeast Asia. It had been reported first in Thailand in 1990. The disease is highly contagious and leads to mass mortality within 2 to 4 days. The cephalothorax of an infected shrimp turns yellow after a period of unusually high feeding activity ending abruptly, and the then moribund shrimp congregate near the surface of their pond before dying.

Early mortality syndrome (EMS) has been linked to a strain of a bacterium called Vibrio parahaemolyticus which affects the Giant Tiger Prawn and the Whiteleg Shrimp, both shrimp that are commonly farmed around the world. The strains are not harmful to humans, but are economically devastating for shrimp farmers. The spread of the bacteria is more prevalent in warmer and saltier ocean waters.

Whitespot syndrome is a disease caused by a family of related viruses. First reported in 1993 from Japanese P. japonicus cultures, it spread throughout Asia and then to the Americas. It has a wide host range and is highly lethal, leading to mortality rates of 100% within days. Symptoms include white spots on the carapace and a red hepatopancreas. Infected shrimp become lethargic before they die.

Taura syndrome was first reported from shrimp farms on the Taura river in Ecuador in 1992. The host of the virus causing the disease is P. vannamei, one of the two most commonly farmed shrimp. The disease spread rapidly, mainly through the shipping of infected animals and broodstock. Originally confined to farms in the Americas, it has also been propagated to Asian shrimp farms with the introduction of L. vannamei there. Birds are thought to be a route of infection between farms within one region.

Infectious hypodermal and hematopoietic necrosis (IHHN) is a disease that causes mass mortality among P. stylirostris (as high as 90%) and severe deformations in L. vannamei. It occurs in Pacific farmed and wild shrimp, but not in wild shrimp on the Atlantic coast of the Americas.

There are also a number of bacterial infections that are lethal to shrimp. The most common is vibriosis, caused by bacteria of the Vibrio species. The shrimp become weak and disoriented, and may have dark wounds on the cuticle. The mortality rate can exceed 70%. Another bacterial disease is necrotising hepatopancreatitis (NHP); symptoms include a soft exoskeleton and fouling. Most such bacterial infections are strongly correlated to stressful conditions, such as overcrowded ponds, high temperatures, and poor water quality, factors that positively influence the growth of bacteria. Treatment is done using antibiotics. Importing countries have repeatedly placed import bans on shrimp containing various antibiotics. One such antibiotic is chloramphenicol, which has been banned in the European Union since 1994, but continues to pose problems.

With their high mortality rates, diseases represent a very real danger to shrimp farmers, who may lose their income for the whole year if their ponds are infected. Since most diseases cannot yet be treated effectively, the industry's efforts are focused on preventing disease outbreak in the first place. Active water quality management helps avoid poor pond conditions favorable to the spread of diseases, and instead of using larvae from wild catches, specific pathogen free broodstocks raised in captivity in isolated environments and certified not to carry diseases are used increasingly. To avoid introducing diseases into such disease-free populations on a farm, there is also a trend to create more controlled environments in the ponds of semi-intensive farms, such as by lining them with plastic to avoid soil contact, and by minimizing water exchange in the ponds.

== Economy ==
The total global production of farmed shrimp reached 2.5 million tonnes in 2005. This accounts for 42% of the total shrimp production that year (farming and wild catches combined). The largest single market for shrimp is the United States, importing between 500 – 600,000 tonnes of shrimp products yearly in the years 2003–2009. About 200,000 tonnes yearly are imported by Japan, while the European Union imported in 2006 another about 500,000 tonnes of tropical shrimps, with the largest importers being Spain and France. (Note: FAO: FIGIS Commodities 1976–2006, query for imports into all EU countries, all shrimps and prawns entries except those giving species other than Penaeus spp. (also excluding "nei" entries; "nei" means "not elsewhere included"). For comparison, the U.S. was also included, and the numbers reported by that selection were found to correspond well with the U.S. DOA numbers after conversion from tonnes to 1,000 pounds. Retrieved February 25, 2010.) The EU also is a major importer of coldwater shrimp from catches, mainly common shrimp (Crangon crangon) and Pandalidae such as Pandalus borealis; in 2006, these imports accounted for about another 200,000 tonnes. (Note: FAO: FIGIS Commodities 1976–2006, same query also including Cangon and Pandalidae. Retrieved February 25, 2010.)

The import prices for shrimp fluctuate wildly. In 2003, the import price per kilogram shrimp in the United States was US$8.80, slightly higher than in Japan at US$8.00. The average import price in the EU was only about US$5.00/kg; this much lower value is explained by the fact that the EU imports more coldwater shrimp (from catches) that are much smaller than the farmed warm water species, and thus attain lower prices. In addition, Mediterranean Europe prefers head-on shrimp, which weigh approximately 30% more, but have a lower unit price.

About 75% of the world production of farmed shrimp comes from Asian countries; the two leading nations being China and Thailand, closely followed by Vietnam, Indonesia, and India. The other 25% are produced in the western hemisphere, where Latin American countries (Brazil, Ecuador, Mexico) dominate. In terms of export, Thailand is by far the leading nation, with a market share of more than 30%, followed by China, Indonesia, and India, accounting each for about 10%. Other major export nations are Vietnam, Bangladesh, and Ecuador. Thailand exports nearly all of its production, while China uses most of its shrimp in the domestic market. The only other major export nation that has a strong domestic market for farmed shrimp is Mexico.

Aquaculture shrimp production by the major producer nations.
Region	Country	Production in 1,000 tonnes per year, rounded																								
Region	Country	1985	86	87	88	89	1990	91	92	93	94	95	96	97	98	99	2000	01	02	03	04	05	06	07	08	09
**Asia**	China	40	83	153	199	186	185	220	207	**88**	64	78	89	96	130	152	192	267	337	432	468	546	640	710	725	796
**Asia**	Thailand	10	12	19	50	90	115	161	185	223	264	259	**238**	225	250	274	309	279	264	330	360	401	494	523	507	539
**Asia**	Vietnam	8	13	19	27	28	32	36	37	39	45	55	46	45	52	55	90	150	181	232	276	327	349	377	381	411
**Asia**	Indonesia	25	29	42	62	82	84	116	120	117	107	121	125	127	97	121	138	149	160	191	239	280	340	330	408	337
**Asia**	India	13	14	15	20	28	35	40	47	62	83	70	70	67	83	79	97	103	115	113	118	131	132	99	80	97
**Asia**	Bangladesh	11	15	15	17	18	19	20	21	28	29	32	42	48	56	58	59	55	56	56	58	63	65	64	67	8
**Asia**	Philippines	29	30	35	44	47	48	47	77	86	91	89	77	**41**	38	39	41	42	37	37	37	39	41	43	48	51
**Asia**	Myanmar	0	0	0	0	0	0	0	0	0	0	1	2	2	2	5	5	6	7	19	30	49	49	48	48	46
**Asia**	Saudi Arabia	0	0	0	0	<1	<1	<1	<1	<1	<1	<1	<1	1	2	2	2	4	5	9	9	11	12	15	18	21
**Asia**	Taiwan	17	45	80	**34**	22	15	22	16	10	8	11	13	6	5	5	7	9	9	10	9	10	8	8	7	5
**Asia**	Malaysia	<1	<1	1	1	2	2	3	3	4	6	7	8	10	10	12	16	27	26	26	31	33	35	35	51	69
**Americas**	Brazil	<1	<1	<1	<1	1	2	2	2	2	2	2	3	4	7	16	25	40	60	90	76	63	65	65	76	65
**Americas**	Ecuador	30	44	69	74	70	76	105	113	**83**	89	106	108	133	144	120	**50**	45	63	77	90	118	149	150	150	179
**Americas**	Mexico	<1	<1	<1	<1	3	4	5	8	12	13	16	13	17	24	29	33	48	46	46	62	90	112	112	130	126
**Americas**	Honduras	<1	1	2	3	3	3	4	6	8	9	7	10	9	7	7	8	11	13	17	18	21	27	26	27	15
**Americas**	Colombia	<1	<1	1	1	3	6	7	9	7	9	8	5	7	7	9	11	12	14	17	18	19	22	20	18	18
**Americas**	Venezuela	0	0	0	<1	<1	<1	1	1	1	2	3	4	5	5	6	9	11	12	14	23	18	21	18	16	10
Entries in italics indicate gross estimates in the FAO databases. (Note: Accurate statistics on shrimp farming do not exist. The FAO relies on the voluntary reporting of countries for its fisheries databases; if no numbers are reported, the FAO fills in its own "guesstimate". Such estimates are marked in the databases, but these obviously also contain estimates made already by the reporting government agencies, recognizable only by the suspiciously round numbers.) Bolded numbers indicate some recognizable disease events.

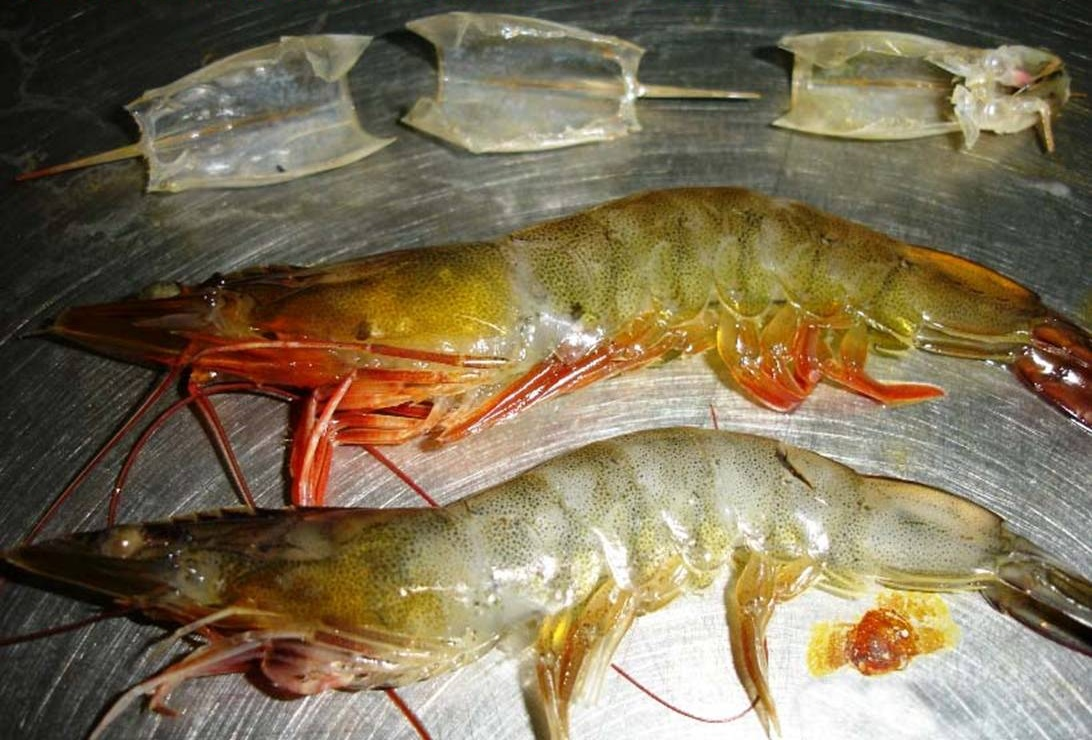
From top to bottom: pieces of the carapace of Litopenaeus vannamei; a harvested healthy L. vannamei of size 66 (17 g); a dead L. vannamei infected by the Taura syndrome virus (TSV). The color of healthy shrimp is determined by the color of the plankton, the type of soil at the pond bottom, and the additional nutrients used. The white color of the shrimp at the bottom is due to the TSV infection.

Disease problems have repeatedly impacted the shrimp production negatively. Besides the near-wipeout of P. chinensis in 1993, there were outbreaks of viral diseases that led to marked declines in the per-country production in 1996/97 in Thailand and repeatedly in Ecuador. In Ecuador alone, production suffered heavily in 1989 (IHHN), 1993 (Taura), and 1999 (whitespot). Another reason for sometimes wild changes in shrimp farm output are the import regulations of the destination countries, which do not allow shrimp contaminated by chemicals or antibiotics to be imported.

In the 1980s and through much of the 1990s, shrimp farming promised high profits. The investments required for extensive farms were low, especially in regions with low land prices and wages. For many tropical countries, especially those with poorer economies, shrimp farming was an attractive business, offering jobs and incomes for poor coastal populations and has, due to the high market prices of shrimp, provided many developing countries with non-negligible foreign currency earnings. Many shrimp farms were funded initially by the World Bank or substantially subsidized by local governments.

In the late 1990s, the economic situation changed. Governments and farmers alike were under increasing pressure from NGOs and the consumer countries, who criticized the practices of the trade. International trade conflicts erupted, such as import bans by consumer countries on shrimp containing antibiotics, the United States' shrimp import ban against Thailand in 2004 as a measure against Thai shrimp fishers not using turtle excluder devices in their nets, or the "anti-dumping" case initiated by U.S. shrimp fishers in 2002 against shrimp farmers worldwide, which resulted two years later in the U.S. imposing antidumping tariffs of the order of about 10% against many producer countries (except China, which received a 112% duty). Diseases caused significant economic losses. In Ecuador, where shrimp farming was a major export sector (the other two are bananas and oil), the whitespot outbreak of 1999 caused an estimated 130,000 workers to lose their jobs. Furthermore, shrimp prices dropped sharply in 2000. All of these factors contributed to the slowly growing acceptance by farmers that improved farming practices were needed, and resulted in tighter government regulation of the business, both of which internalized some of the external costs that were ignored during the boom years.

=== Socioeconomic aspects ===
Shrimp farming offers significant employment opportunities, which may help alleviate the poverty of the local coastal populations in many areas, if it is properly managed. The published literature on that topic shows large discrepancies, and much of the available data are of anecdotal nature. Estimates of the labor intensity of shrimp farms range from about one-third to three times more than when the same area was used for rice paddies, with much regional variation and depending on the type of farms surveyed. In general, intensive shrimp farming requires more labor per unit area than extensive farming. Extensive shrimp farms cover much more land area and are often, but not always, located in areas where no agricultural land uses are possible. Supporting industries such as feed production or storage, handling, and trade companies should also not be neglected, even if not all of them are exclusive to shrimp farming.

Typically, workers on a shrimp farm can get better wages than with other employment. A global estimate from one study is that a shrimp farm worker can earn 1.5–3 times as much as in other jobs; a study from India arrived at a salary increase of about 1.6, and a report from Mexico states the lowest paid job at shrimp farms was paid in 1996 at 1.22 times the average worker salary in the country.

NGOs have frequently criticized that most of the profits went to large conglomerates instead of to the local population. While this may be true in certain regions, such as Ecuador, where most shrimp farms are owned by large companies, it does not apply in all cases. For instance in Thailand, most farms are owned by small local entrepreneurs, although there is a trend to vertically integrate the industries related to shrimp farming from feed producers to food processors and trade companies. A 1994 study reported a farmer in Thailand could increase their income by a factor of ten by switching from growing rice to farming shrimp. An Indian study from 2003 arrives at similar figures for shrimp farming in the East Godavari district in Andhra Pradesh.

Whether the local population benefits from shrimp farming is also dependent on the availability of sufficiently trained people. Extensive farms tend to offer mainly seasonal jobs during harvest that do not require much training. In Ecuador, many of these positions are known to have been filled by migrant workers. More intensive farms have a need for year-round labor in more sophisticated jobs.

=== Marketing ===
For commercialization, shrimp are graded and marketed in different categories. From complete shrimp (known as "head-on, shell-on" or HOSO) to peeled and deveined (P&D), any presentation is available in stores. The animals are graded by their size uniformity and then also by their count per weight unit, with larger shrimp attaining higher prices.

== Ecological impacts ==
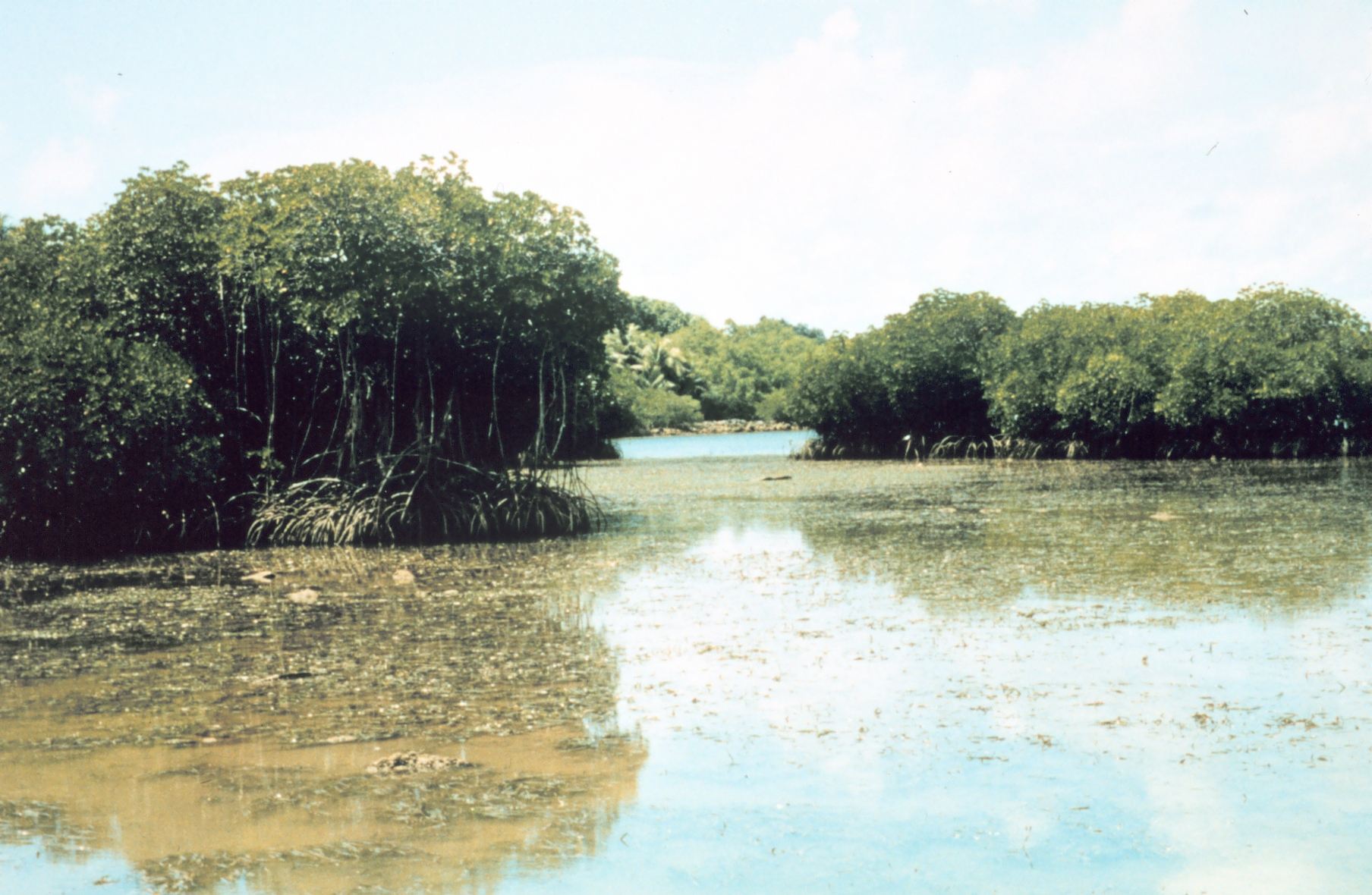
Mangrove estuaries provide a habitat for many animals and plants.

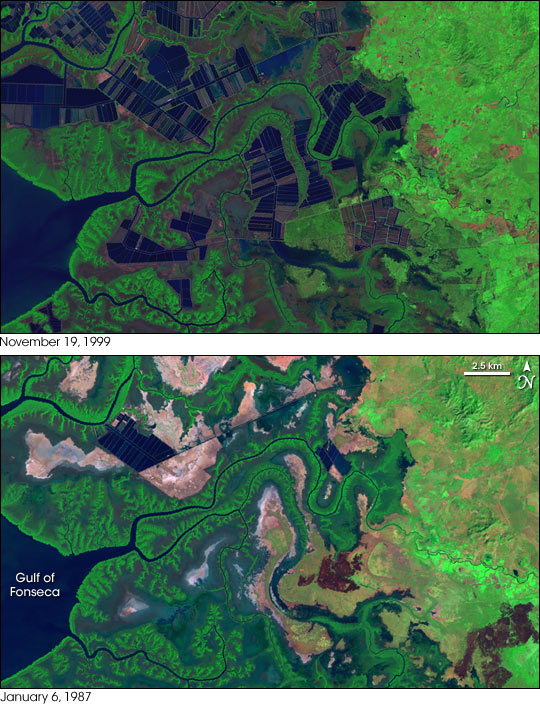
Two false-color images show the widespread conversion of natural mangrove swamps to shrimp farms along the Pacific Coast of Honduras between 1987 and 1999. The shrimp farms appear as rows of rectangles. In the older image (bottom), mangrove swamps stretch across the estuaries of several rivers; one shrimp farm is already visible in the upper left quadrant. By 1999 (top image), much of the region had been converted to blocks of shrimp ponds.

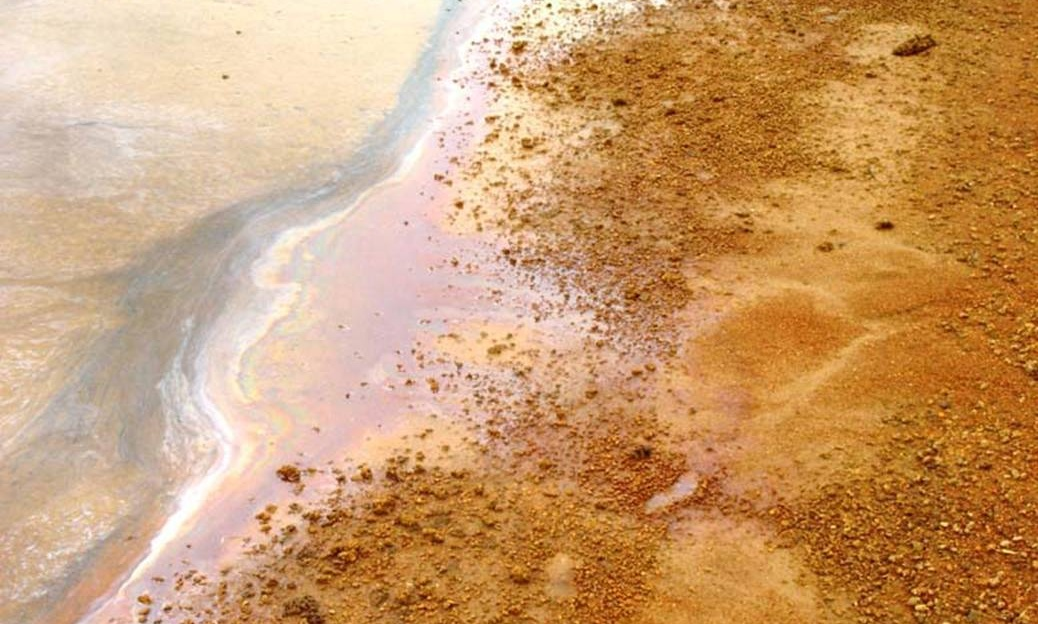
Toxic sludge oozing out of the bottom of a shrimp pond of a farm in Indonesia after the harvest. The liquid pictured here contained sulfuric acid resulting from oxidation of pyrite contained in the soil. Such contamination of a pond leads to stunted growth of the shrimp and increased mortality rates; the growth of the plankton is reduced drastically. Liming can be applied to counteract to some extent the acidification of the water in ponds on acid sulfate soil, such as mangrove soils.

Shrimp farms of all types, from extensive to super-intensive, can cause severe ecological problems wherever they are located. For extensive farms, huge areas of mangroves were cleared, reducing biodiversity. During the 1980s and 1990s, about 35% of the world's mangrove forests had vanished. Shrimp farming was a major cause of this, accounting for over a third of it according to one study; other studies report between 5% and 10% globally, with enormous regional variability. Other causes of mangrove destruction are population pressure, logging, pollution from other industries, or conversion to other uses such as salt pans. Mangroves, through their roots, help stabilize a coastline and capture sediments; their removal has led to a marked increase of erosion and less protection against floods. Mangrove estuaries are also especially rich and productive ecosystems and provide the spawning grounds for many species of fish, including many commercially important ones. Many countries have protected their mangroves and forbidden the construction of new shrimp farms in tidal or mangrove areas. The enforcement of the respective laws is often problematic, though, and especially in the least developed countries such as Bangladesh, Myanmar, or Vietnam the conversion of mangroves to shrimp farms remains an issue for areas such as the Myanmar Coast mangroves.

Intensive farms, while reducing the direct impact on the mangroves, have other problems. Their nutrient-rich effluents (industrial shrimp feeds disintegrate quickly, as little as 30% are actually eaten by the shrimp with a corresponding economic loss to the farmer, the rest is wasted) are typically discharged into the environment, seriously upsetting the ecological balance. These waste waters contain significant amounts of chemical fertilizers, pesticides, and antibiotics that cause pollution of the environment. Furthermore, releasing antibiotics in such ways injects them into the food chain and increases the risks of bacteria becoming resistant against them. However, most aquatic bacteria, unlike bacteria associated with terrestrial animals, are not zoonotic. Only a few disease transfers from animals to humans have been reported.

Prolonged use of a pond can lead to an incremental buildup of a sludge at the pond's bottom from waste products and excrement. The sludge can be removed mechanically, or dried and plowed to allow biodecomposition, at least in areas without acid problems. Flushing a pond never completely removes this sludge, and eventually, the pond is abandoned, leaving behind a wasteland, with the soil made unusable for any other purposes due to the high levels of salinity, acidity, and toxic chemicals. A typical pond in an extensive farm can be used only a few years. An Indian study estimated the time to rehabilitate such lands to about 30 years. Thailand has banned inland shrimp farms since 1999 because they caused too much destruction of agricultural lands due to salination. A Thai study estimated 60% of the shrimp farming area in Thailand was abandoned in the years 1989–1996. Many of these problems stem from using mangrove land that has high natural pyrite content (acid sulfate soil) and poor drainage. The shift to semi-intensive farming requires higher elevations for drain harvesting and low sulfide (pyrite) content to prevent acid formation when the soils shift from anaerobic to aerobic conditions.

The global nature of the shrimp farming business, and in particular the shipment of broodstock and hatchery products, throughout the world have not only introduced various shrimp species as exotic species, but also distributed the diseases the shrimp may carry worldwide. As a consequence, most broodstock shipments require health certificates and/or to have specific pathogen free (SPF) status. Many organizations lobby actively for consumers to avoid buying farmed shrimp; some also advocate the development of more sustainable farming methods. A joint programme of the World Bank, the Network of Aquaculture Centres in Asia-Pacific (NACA), the WWF, and the FAO was established in August 1999 to study and propose improved practices for shrimp farming. Some existing attempts at sustainable export-oriented shrimp farming marketing the shrimp as "ecologically produced" are criticized by NGOs as being dishonest and trivial window-dressing.

Yet, the industry has been slowly changing since about 1999. It has adopted the "best management practices" developed by the World Bank program, for example, and others. and instituted educational programs to promote them. Due to the mangrove protection laws enacted in many countries, new farms are usually of the semi-intensive kind, which are best constructed outside mangrove areas anyway. There is a trend to create even more tightly controlled environments in these farms, with the hope to achieve better disease prevention. Waste water treatment has attracted considerable attention; modern shrimp farms routinely have effluent treatment ponds where sediments are allowed to settle at the bottom and other residuals are filtered. As such improvements are costly, the World Bank program also recommends low-intensity polyculture farming for some areas. Since it has been discovered that mangrove soils are effective in filtering waste waters and tolerate high nitrate levels, the industry has also developed an interest in mangrove reforestation, although its contributions in that area are still minor. The long-term effects of these recommendations and industry trends cannot be evaluated conclusively yet.

Still, it was reported in 2012 that one pound of frozen shrimp adds one ton of carbon dioxide to the atmosphere, more than ten times that generated to produce the same weight of beef raised on cleared rainforest land.

== Social changes ==
Shrimp farming in many cases has far-reaching effects on the local coastal population. Especially in the boom years of the 1980s and 1990s, when the business was largely unregulated in many countries, the very fast expansion of the industry caused significant changes that sometimes were detrimental to the local population. Conflicts can be traced back to two root causes: competition for common resources such as land and water, and changes induced by wealth redistribution.

A significant problem causing much conflict in some regions, for instance in Bangladesh, are the land use rights. With shrimp farming, a new industry expanded into coastal areas and started to make exclusive use of previously public resources. In some areas, the rapid expansion resulted in the local coastal population being denied access to the coast by a continuous strip of shrimp farms with serious impacts on the local fisheries. Such problems were compounded by poor ecological practices that caused a degradation of common resources (such as excessive use of freshwater to control the salinity of the ponds, causing the water table to sink and leading to the salination of freshwater aquifers by an inflow of salt water). With growing experience, countries usually introduced stronger governmental regulations and have taken steps to mitigate such problems, for instance through land zoning legislations and by offering economic incentives through tax and payment services. Some late adopters have even managed to avoid some problems through proactive legislation, e.g. Mexico. The situation in Mexico is unique owing to the strongly government-regulated market. Even after the liberalisation in the early 1990s, most shrimp farms are still owned and controlled by locals or local co-ops (ejidos).

Social tensions have occurred due to changes in the wealth distribution within populations. The effects of this are mixed, though, and the problems are not unique to shrimp farming. Changes in the distribution of wealth tend to induce changes in the power structure within a community. In some cases, there is a widening gap between the general population and local elites who have easier access to credits, subsidies, and permits and thus are more likely to become shrimp farmers and benefit more. In Bangladesh, on the other hand, local elites were opposing shrimp farming, which was controlled largely by an urban elite. Land concentrations in a few hands has been recognized to carry an increased risk of social and economic problems developing, especially if the landowners are non-local.

In general, it has been found that shrimp farming is accepted best and introduced most easily and with the greatest benefits for the local communities if the farms are owned by local people instead of by restricted remote élites or large companies because local owners have a direct interest in maintaining the environment and good relations with their neighbors, and because it avoids the formation of large-scale land property.

== Sustainable practices ==
Although shrimp farming has disrupted social structures, it is possible for both commercial industries and independent farmers to succeed. Closed system shrimp aquaculture for instance, is becoming widely used in the US and is making its way to Southeast Asia. This system takes place indoors in moderate sized pools which efficiently circulates the water. In some cases filter feeders such as shellfish and other fish are introduced in the system, feeding off nutrients in the water that would otherwise be cycled out. This option is more environmentally safe than large scale intensive farming practices. Unfortunately, this system is capital intensive and would be difficult for small scale, independent shrimp farmers to acquire. However, this would be an excellent alternative for larger shrimp industries in Thailand.

Another alternative would be to revert to traditional shrimp farming practices, without overstocking and the use of harmful chemicals. This would be an ideal option for small scale shrimp farmers supplying for their own community as well as creating an independent food source.

== See also ==
- Freshwater prawn farming shares many characteristics and problems with marine shrimp farming. Unique problems are introduced by developmental life cycle of the main species (the giant river prawn, Macrobrachium rosenbergii). The global annual production of freshwater prawns (excluding crayfish and crabs) in 2003 was about 280,000 tonnes, of which China produced some 180,000 tonnes, followed by India and Thailand with some 35,000 tonnes each. China also produced about 370,000 tonnes of Chinese mitten crab (Eriocheir sinensis). (Note: Data extracted from the FAO Fisheries Global Aquaculture Production Database for freshwater crustaceans. The most recent data sets are for 2003 and sometimes contain estimates. Retrieved June 28, 2005.)
- Shrimp fishery
- Krill fishery
