= Crustacean neurohormone family =

Crust_neurohorm
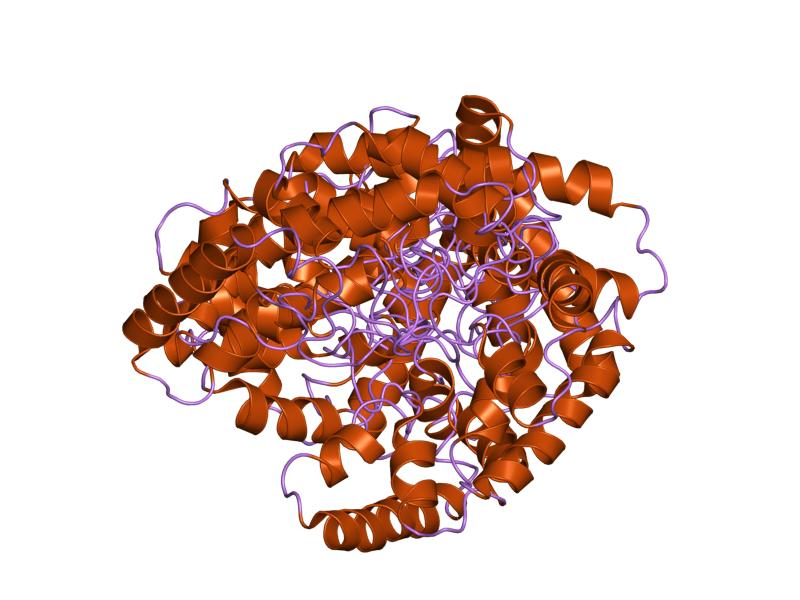
- Solution structure of moult-inhibiting hormone from the kuruma prawn

Identifiers
- Symbol: Crust_neurohorm
- Pfam: PF01147
- InterPro: IPR001166
- PROSITE: PDOC00963
- SCOP2: 1j0t / SCOPe / SUPFAM
- OPM superfamily: 75
- OPM protein: 1j0t
Available protein structures:
- PDB: IPR001166 PF01147 (ECOD; PDBsum)
- AlphaFold: IPR001166; PF01147

In molecular biology, the crustacean neurohormone family is a family of neuropeptides expressed by arthropods. The family includes the following types of neurohormones:

- Crustacean hyperglycaemic hormone (CHH). CHH is primarily involved in blood sugar regulation, but also plays a role in the control of moulting and reproduction.
- Moult-inhibiting hormone (MIH). MIH inhibits Y-organs where moulting hormone (ecdysteroid) is secreted. A moulting cycle is initiated when MIH secretion diminishes or stops.
- Gonad-inhibiting hormone (GIH), also known as vitellogenesis-inhibiting hormone (VIH) because of its role in inhibiting vitellogenesis in female animals.
- Mandibular organ-inhibiting hormone (MOIH). MOIH represses the synthesis of methyl farnesoate, the precursor of insect juvenile hormone III in the mandibular organ.
- Ion transport peptide (ITP) from locust. ITP stimulates salt and water reabsorption and inhibits acid secretion in the ileum of the locust.
- Caenorhabditis elegans uncharacterised protein ZC168.2.

These neurohormones are peptides of 70 to 80 amino acid residues which are processed from larger precursors. They contain six conserved cysteines that are involved in disulfide bonds.
