= NHP =

NHP may refer to:

- Natural health product, a term used in Canada to describe natural supplements
- National Historical Park, a term used in the United States to describe historic and/or significant natural areas
- Necrotising hepatopancreatitis, a lethal epizootic disease of farmed shrimp
- Nevada Highway Patrol, a division of the Nevada Department of Public Safety
- Nominal horsepower, an early 19th-century rule of thumb used to estimate the power of steam engines
- Non-human primate, primate species except humans
