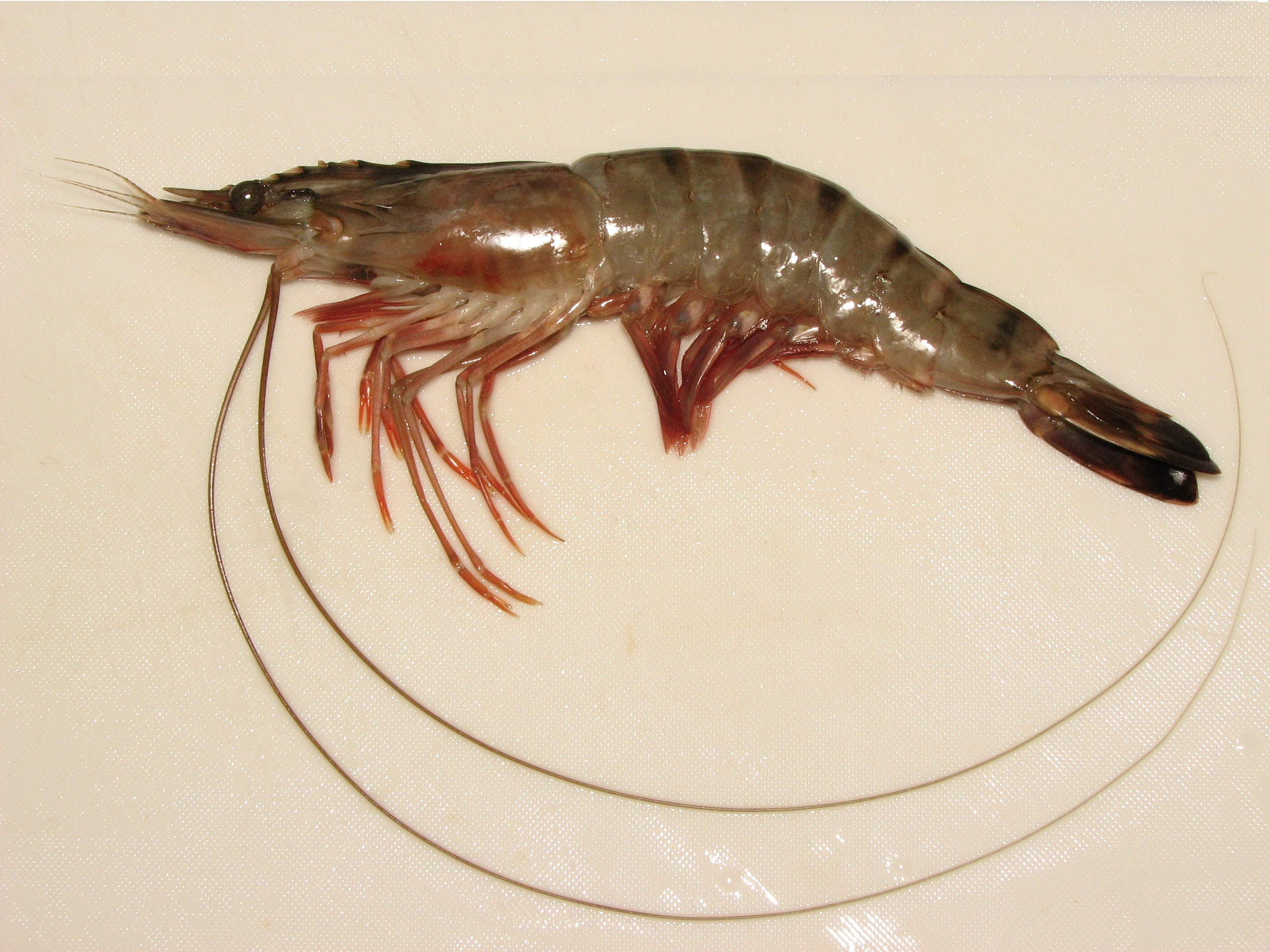
- Penaeus monodon

Scientific classification
- Kingdom: Animalia
- Phylum: Arthropoda
- Clade: Pancrustacea
- Class: Malacostraca
- Order: Decapoda
- Suborder: Dendrobranchiata
- Family: Penaeidae
- Genus: Penaeus; Fabricius, 1798

Species
- Penaeus esculentus Haswell, 1879; Penaeus hathor (Burkenroad, 1959); Penaeus monodon Fabricius, 1798; Penaeus semisulcatus De Haan, 1844

= Penaeus =

Genus of decapod crustaceans

Penaeus is a genus of prawns, containing several commercially important edible species. The giant tiger prawn (P. monodon) is the most important species of farmed crustacean worldwide.

== Taxonomy ==
In 1969, Isabel Pérez Farfante proposed four subgenera of Penaeus: Litopenaeus, Penaeus (nominate subgenus), Fenneropenaeus, and Melicertus. Rudolf N. Burukovsky proposed an additional subgenus Farfantepenaeus in 1972, spit from subgenus Penaeus; however, he did not specify a type taxon, which was corrected in 1997.

The genus was reorganised following a 1997 proposition of Pérez Farfante and Brian Frederick Kensley based on morphological differences, in particular the genital characteristics of these animals, although this revision was not universally accepted. Following the revision, many species formerly in the genus Penaeus were reassigned to new genera in the family Penaeidae: Farfantepenaeus, Fenneropenaeus, Litopenaeus, Melicertus and Marsupenaeus.

In 2023, based on molecular phylogenetic analyses, Chan proposed a reunification of Peneaus sensu lato, with reclassification into eleven subgenera. Fenneropenaeus, Litopenaeus, and Farfantepenaeus retain their scope of included species, but are returned to their original subgeneric rank. Melicertus is assessed as diverse, and split into six.

The following table gives an overview:

Subgenus	Epithet	Species	Pérez Farfante and Kensley	Common name(s)
(Penaeus)	monodon	P. (P.) monodon	Penaeus monodon	giant tiger prawn, black tiger shrimp
(Melicertus)	kerathurus	P. (M.) kerathurus	Melicertus kerathurus	caramote prawn, triple-grooved shrimp
(Fenneropenaeus)	chinensis	P. (Fe.) chinensis	Fenneropenaeus chinensis	fleshy prawn, Chinese white shrimp, oriental shrimp
(Fenneropenaeus)	orientalis	P. (Fe.) orientalis	Fenneropenaeus chinensis	fleshy prawn, Chinese white shrimp, oriental shrimp
(Fenneropenaeus)	indicus	P. (Fe.) indicus	Fenneropenaeus indicus	Indian prawn, redleg banana prawn, Indian banana prawn
(Fenneropenaeus)	merguiensis	P. (Fe.) merguiensis	Fenneropenaeus merguiensis	banana shrimp, banana prawn, white banana prawn, Gulf banana prawn
(Fenneropenaeus)	penicillatus	P. (Fe.) penicillatus	Fenneropenaeus penicillatus	redtail prawn
(Fenneropenaeus)	silasi	P. (Fe.) silasi	Fenneropenaeus silasi	
(Litopenaeus)	occidentalis	P. (L.) occidentalis	Litopenaeus occidentalis	western white shrimp
(Litopenaeus)	schmitti	P. (L.) schmitti	Litopenaeus schmitti	southern white shrimp
(Litopenaeus)	setiferus	P. (L.) setiferus	Litopenaeus setiferus	northern white shrimp
(Litopenaeus)	stylirostris	P. (L.) stylirostris	Litopenaeus stylirostris	western blue shrimp, blue shrimp (Note: Also marketed as paradise prawn, tenshi-no-ebi (天使の海老, 'angel shrimp'), and crystal prawn.) (Note: FAO code "PNS", trade goods category "0306 17 92” (crustaceans - other shrimps and prawns - shrimp of genus Penaeus))
(Litopenaeus)	vannamei	P. (L.) vannamei	Litopenaeus vannamei	whiteleg shrimp, Pacific white shrimp, king prawn, vannamei prawn
(Marsupenaeus)	japonicus	P. japonicus	Marsupenaeus japonicus	Kuruma shrimp, Kuruma prawn, Japanese tiger shrimp
(Farfantepenaeus)	aztecus	P. (Fa.) aztecus	Farfantepenaeus aztecus	northern brown shrimp
(Farfantepenaeus)	brasiliensis	P. (Fa.) brasiliensis	Farfantepenaeus brasiliensis	red-spotted shrimp, spotted pink shrimp
(Farfantepenaeus)	brevirostris	P. (Fa.) brevirostris	Farfantepenaeus brevirostris	crystal shrimp, pink shrimp
(Farfantepenaeus)	californiensis	P. (Fa.) californiensis	Farfantepenaeus californiensis	yellowleg shrimp, brown shrimp
(Farfantepenaeus)	duorarum	P. (Fa.) duorarum	Farfantepenaeus duorarum	northern pink shrimp
(Farfantepenaeus)	isabelae	P. (Fa.) isabelae		
(Farfantepenaeus)	notialis	P. (Fa.) notialis	Farfantepenaeus notialis	southern pink shrimp
(Farfantepenaeus)	paulensis	P. (Fa.) paulensis	Farfantepenaeus paulensis	São Paulo shrimp, Carpas shrimp
(Farfantepenaeus)	subtilis	P. (Fa.) subtilis	Farfantepenaeus subtilis	southern brown shrimp
(Altiopeneaus)	marginatus	P. (A.) marginatus	Melicertus marginatus	aloha prawn
(Eopenaeus)	esculentus	P. (E.) esculentus	Penaeus esculentus	brown tiger prawn
(Eopenaeus)	semisulcatus	P. (E.) semisulcatus	Penaeus semisulcatus	green tiger prawn
(Ischiopeneaus)	longistylus	P. (I.) longistylus	Melicertus longistylus	redspot king prawn, red-spotted prawn
(Oleopenaeus)	hathor	P. (O.) hathor	Penaeus hathor	
(Oleopenaeus)	latisculatus	P. (O.) latisculatus	Melicertus latisulcatus	western king prawn
(Oleopenaeus)	plebejus	P. (O.) plebejus	Melicertus plebejus	eastern king prawn
(Plagosopenaeus)	canaliculatus	P. (Pl.) canaliculatus	Melicertus canaliculatus	witch shrimp, tiger shrimp
