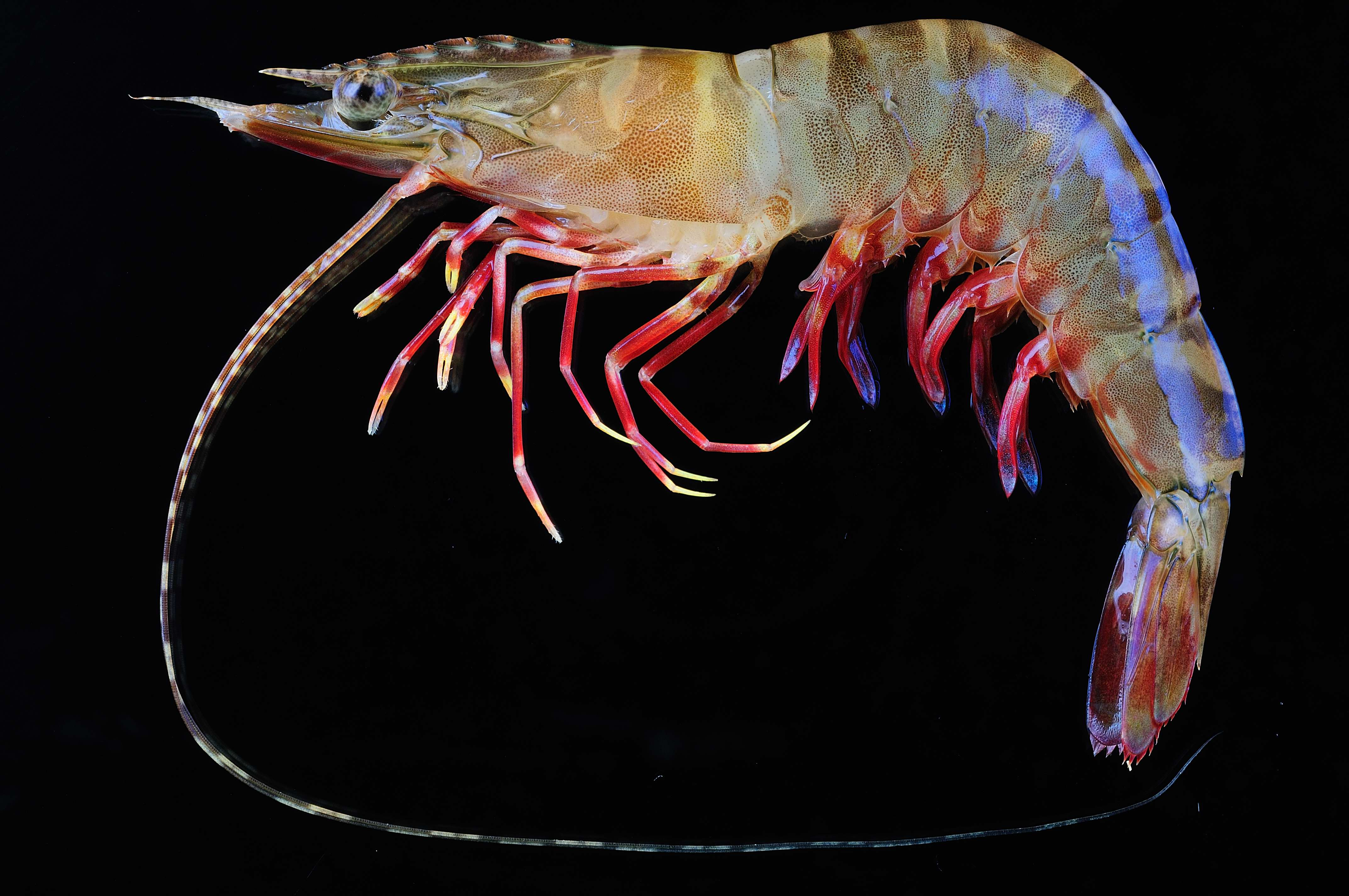

Scientific classification
- Kingdom: Animalia
- Phylum: Arthropoda
- Clade: Pancrustacea
- Class: Malacostraca
- Order: Decapoda
- Suborder: Dendrobranchiata
- Family: Penaeidae
- Genus: Penaeus
- Species: P. semisulcatus

Binomial name
- Penaeus semisulcatus De Haan, 1844 (in De Haan, 1833-1850)

Synonyms
- Penaeus ashiaka Kishinouye, 1900; Penaeus manilensis de Procé, 1822; Penaeus monodon manillensis Villaluz & Arriola, 1938; Penaeus semisulcatus paucidentatus Parisi, 1919

= Penaeus semisulcatus =

Species of crustacean

Penaeus semisulcatus, the green tiger prawn or grooved tiger prawn, is a commercially important species of prawn in the genus Penaeus.

== Description ==
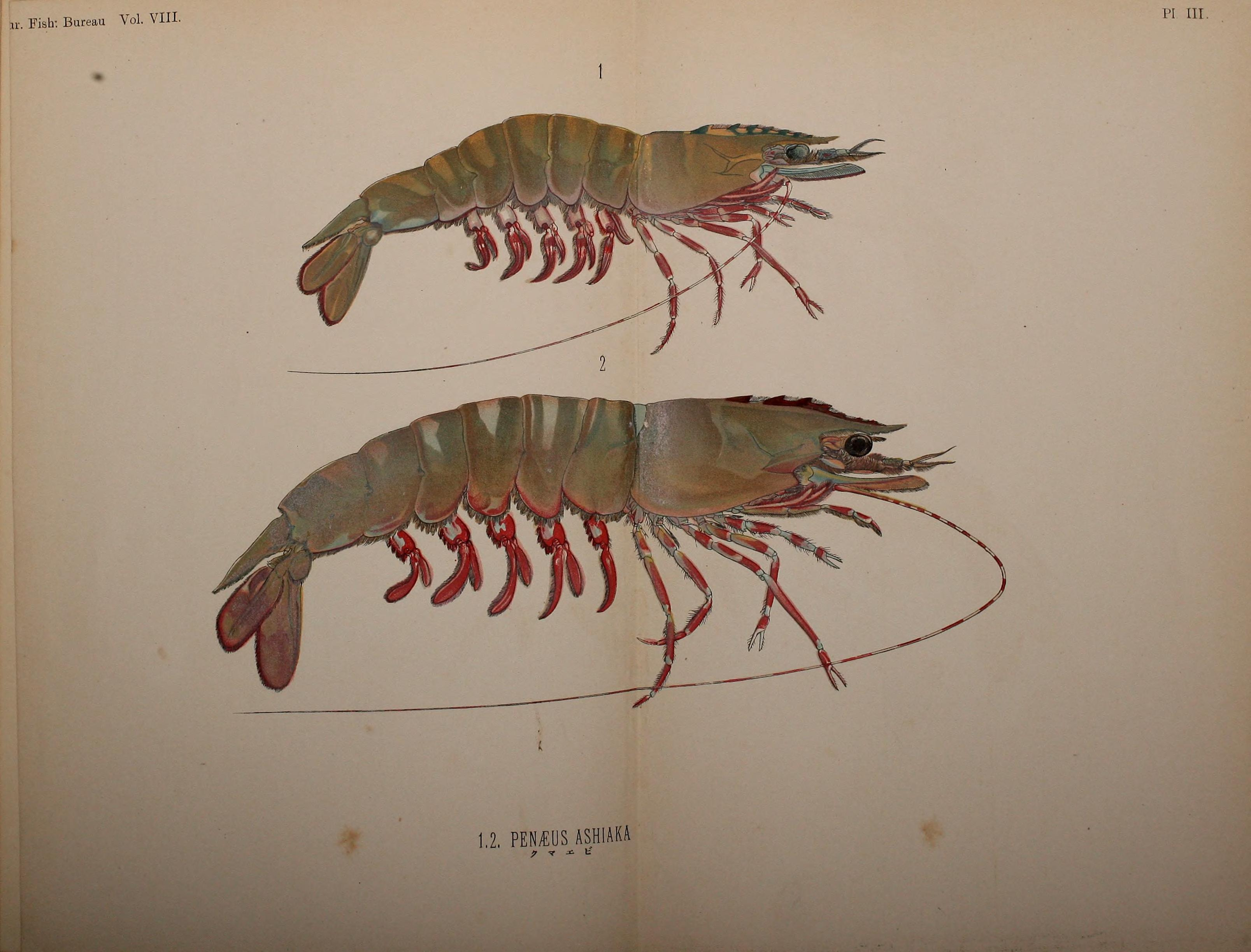
Illustration of the green tiger prawn.

Penaeus semisulcatus has a pale brown body which sometimes shows a greenish tint on the carapace with two yellow or cream transverse bands across the back of the carapace. The abdomen is banded with brownish grey and pale-yellow transverse bands, while the antennae are banded brown and yellow. It has a uniformly smooth carapace and abdomen. The rostrum has seven or eight dorsal teeth and three ventral teeth. The atrodrostral crest and groove, the carina, extends beyond the epigastral tooth with the postrostral carina almost reaching to the rear of the carapace. The maximum total length is 180 mm for males and 228 mm for females, weighing up to 130 g.

== Distribution ==
Penaeus semisulcatus has an Indo-West Pacific distribution, being found from eastern Africa and the Red Sea east to Indonesia and northern Australia. It has also colonised the eastern Mediterranean through the Suez Canal, making it a Lessepsian migrant.

== Habitat and ecology ==
It occurs from coastal waters down to 130 m depth over sandy and muddy substrates. In the Persian Gulf, P. semisculatus spawning was at its height during December and in March, but a secondary peak occurred in autumn; 90% of the female prawns reached sexual maturity after attaining a carapace length of 54 mm. Spawning takes place mainly offshore. The adults are marine but the juveniles prefer estuarine environments.

== Human exploitation ==
Penaeus semisulcatus is of minor to moderate importance in Madagascar, along the eastern coast of Africa and in the Red Sea. Along the southwestern Asian coasts from the Gulf of Aden to Pakistan, this species is of major importance to the offshore fishery. In India, it is not as commercially important as Penaeus monodon. P.semisulcatisis is probably an economically important species in Sri Lanka, Singapore, and the Philippines, as well as in Hong Kong, southern Sea of Japan, and Korea. In the Mediterranean, it is becoming important to the fisheries in Turkey, Israel, and Egypt.

In India, P. semisulcatus plays a role in the farming of shrimp and prawns in the ricefields of the Ganges Delta. Aquaculture experiments with this species are being conducted in Taiwan and Thailand. Prawns caught in Pakistan are exported frozen or canned, or used to make shrimp meal and shrimp paste.

== Australian import ban ==
In 2017, an outbreak of white spot disease occurred in Southeast Asia, leading Australia to ban prawn imports.
