= Necrotising hepatopancreatitis =

Lethal epizootic disease of farmed shrimp

Necrotising hepatopancreatitis (NHP), is also known as Texas necrotizing hepatopancreatitis (TNHP), Texas pond mortality syndrome (TPMS) and Peru necrotizing hepatopancreatitis (PNHP), is a lethal epizootic disease of farmed shrimp. It is not very well researched yet, but generally assumed to be caused by a bacterial infection.

NHP mainly affects the farmed shrimp species Litopenaeus vannamei (Pacific white shrimp) and Litopenaeus stylirostris (western blue shrimp), but has also been reported in three other American species, namely Farfantepenaeus aztecus, Farfantepenaeus californiensis, and Litopenaeus setiferus. The highest mortality rates occur in L. vannamei, which is one of the two most frequently farmed species of shrimp. Untreated, the disease causes mortality rates of up to 90 percent within 30 days. A first outbreak of NHP had been reported in Texas in 1985; the disease then spread to shrimp aquacultures in South America.

NHP is associated with a small, gram-negative, and highly pleomorphic Rickettsia-like bacterium that belongs to its own, new genus in the class Alphaproteobacteria.

The aetiological agent is the pathogenic agent Candidatus Hepatobacter penaei, an obligate intracellular bacterium of the order α-Proteobacteria.

Infected shrimps show gross signs including soft shells and flaccid bodies, black or darkened gills, dark edges of the pleopods, and uropods, and an atrophied hepatopancreas that is whitish instead of orange or tan as is usual.

The pathogen that causes NHP seems to prefer high water temperatures (above 29 °C or 84 °F) and elevated levels of salinity (more than 20–38 ppt). Avoiding such conditions in shrimp ponds is thus an important disease control measure.
