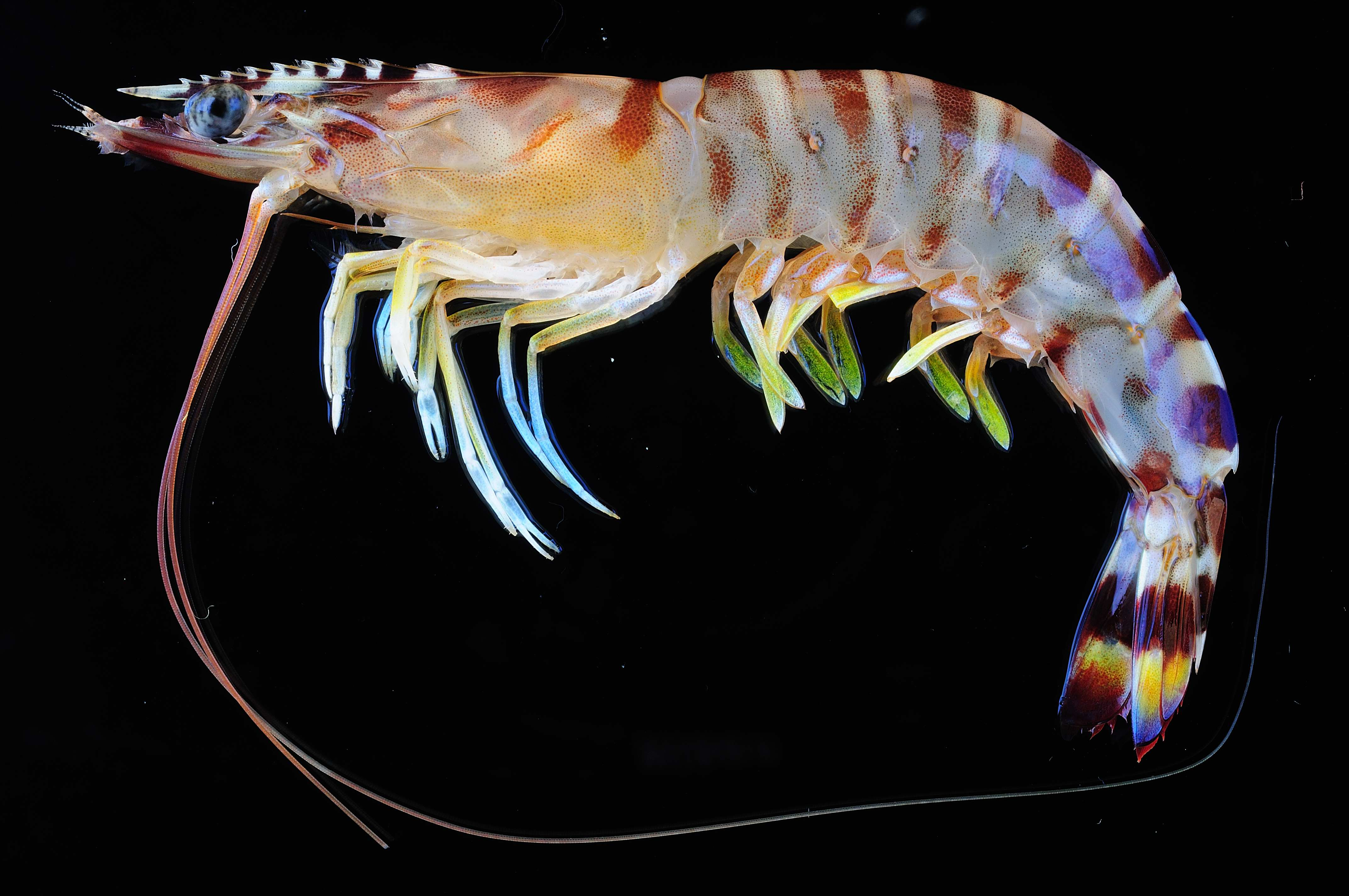

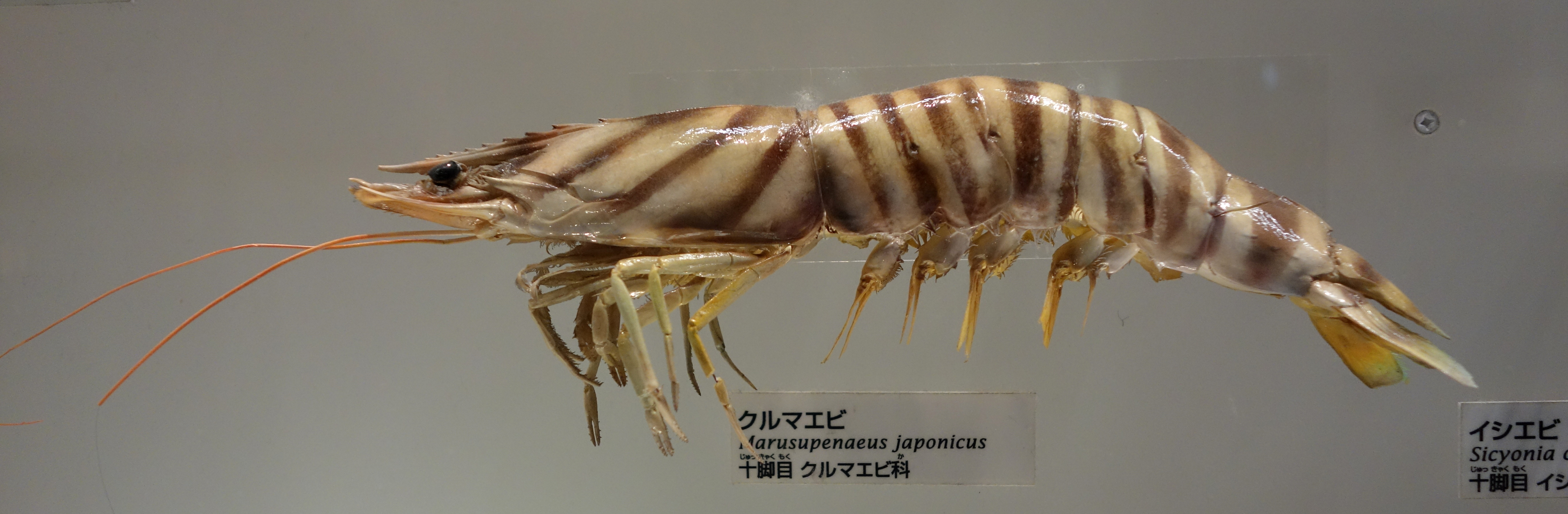

Scientific classification
- Kingdom: Animalia
- Phylum: Arthropoda
- Clade: Pancrustacea
- Class: Malacostraca
- Order: Decapoda
- Suborder: Dendrobranchiata
- Family: Penaeidae
- Genus: Marsupenaeus; Tirmizi, 1971
- Species: M. japonicus

Binomial name
- Marsupenaeus japonicus (Spence Bate, 1888)

Synonyms
- Penaeus canaliculatus var. japonicus Spence Bate, 1888; Penaeus japonicus Spence Bate, 1888 (basionym); Penaeus pulchricaudatus Stebbing, 1914

= Marsupenaeus =

Marsupenaeus japonicus

Genus of crustaceans

Marsupenaeus is a monotypic genus of prawn. It contains a single species, Marsupenaeus japonicus, known as the kuruma shrimp, kuruma prawn, or Japanese tiger prawn. It occurs naturally in bays and seas of the Indo-West Pacific, but has also reached the Mediterranean Sea as a Lessepsian migrant. It is one of the largest species of prawns, and is accordingly one of the most economically important species in the family.

== Description ==
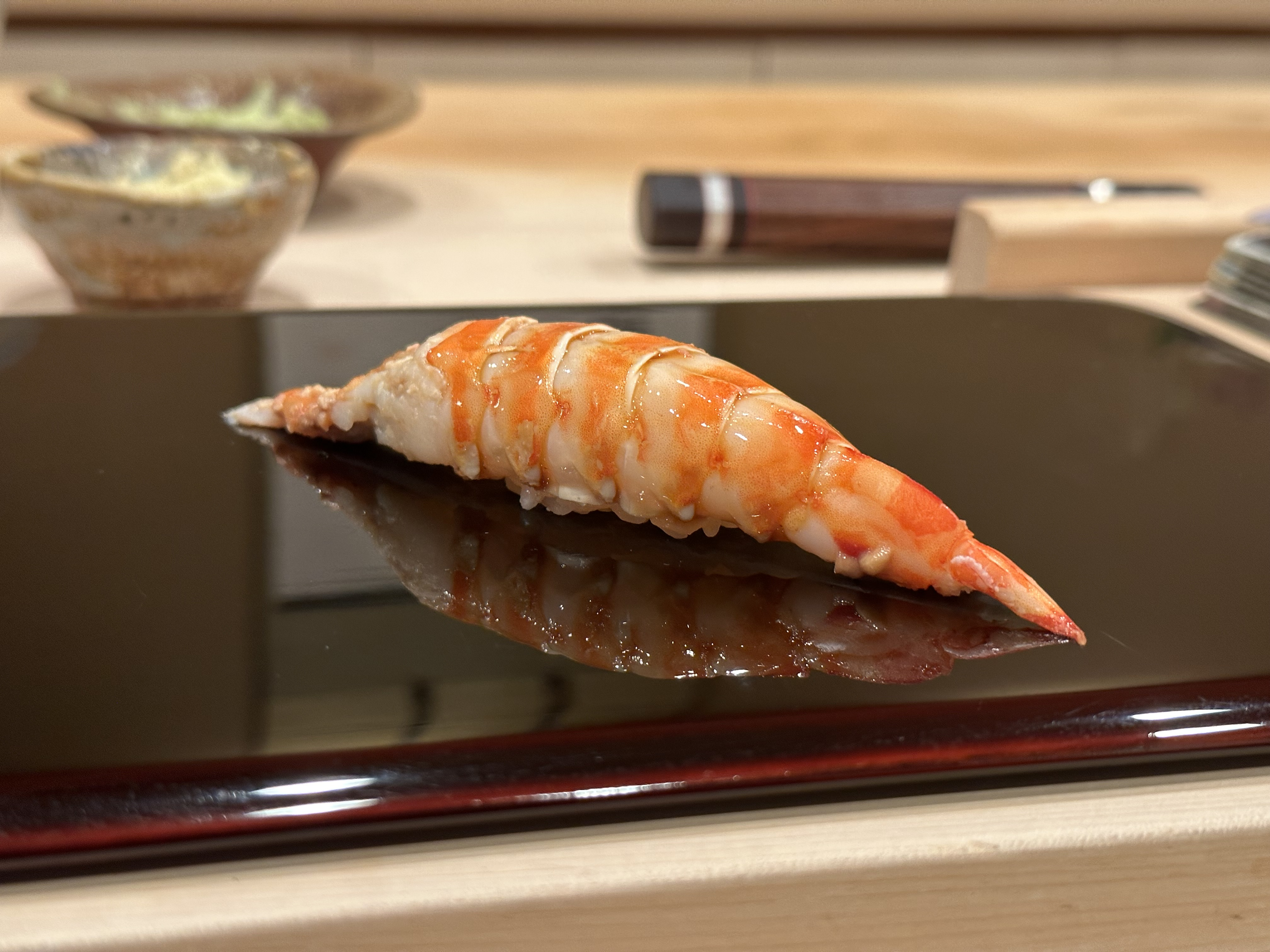
Sushi made of kuruma prawn

Males of M. japonicus can reach a total length of 17 cm (6.7 in), while females may reach 27 cm (11 in) and a mass of 130 grams (4.6 oz), making it one of the largest species in the family Penaeidae. The body is pale, with brown bands across the back, while the pereiopods and pleopods (walking and swimming legs, respectively) are pale yellow near their bases, and blue near the tips. The rostrum bears 8–10 spines on the top, and one or two below.

== Ecology and behavior ==
M. japonicus lives in bays and inland seas, particularly where warm currents occur. It is nocturnal, remaining buried in the substrate during the day. Its predators include bony fishes and cartilaginous fishes.

When the sea temperature exceeds 20 °C (68 °F), spawning can begin. During copulation, the male transfers a spermatophore to the female, which she stores in a seminal receptacle. She travels to deep water, where she then releases around 700,000 eggs. These hatch as nauplii, and pass through further five nauplius stages, three zoeae, and three mysis stages by moulting before reaching the postlarval stage.

== Distribution and invasiveness ==
The natural distribution of M. japonicus extends from the coast of East Africa and the Red Sea as far east as Fiji and Japan.

M. japonicus has entered the Mediterranean Sea as a Lessepsian migrant, through the Suez Canal. It was first observed in Egypt in 1924, and has since spread through the Levant and around the coast of Turkey. Further populations have been established after the species was released at various sites around France, Italy, and Greece.

== Taxonomy ==
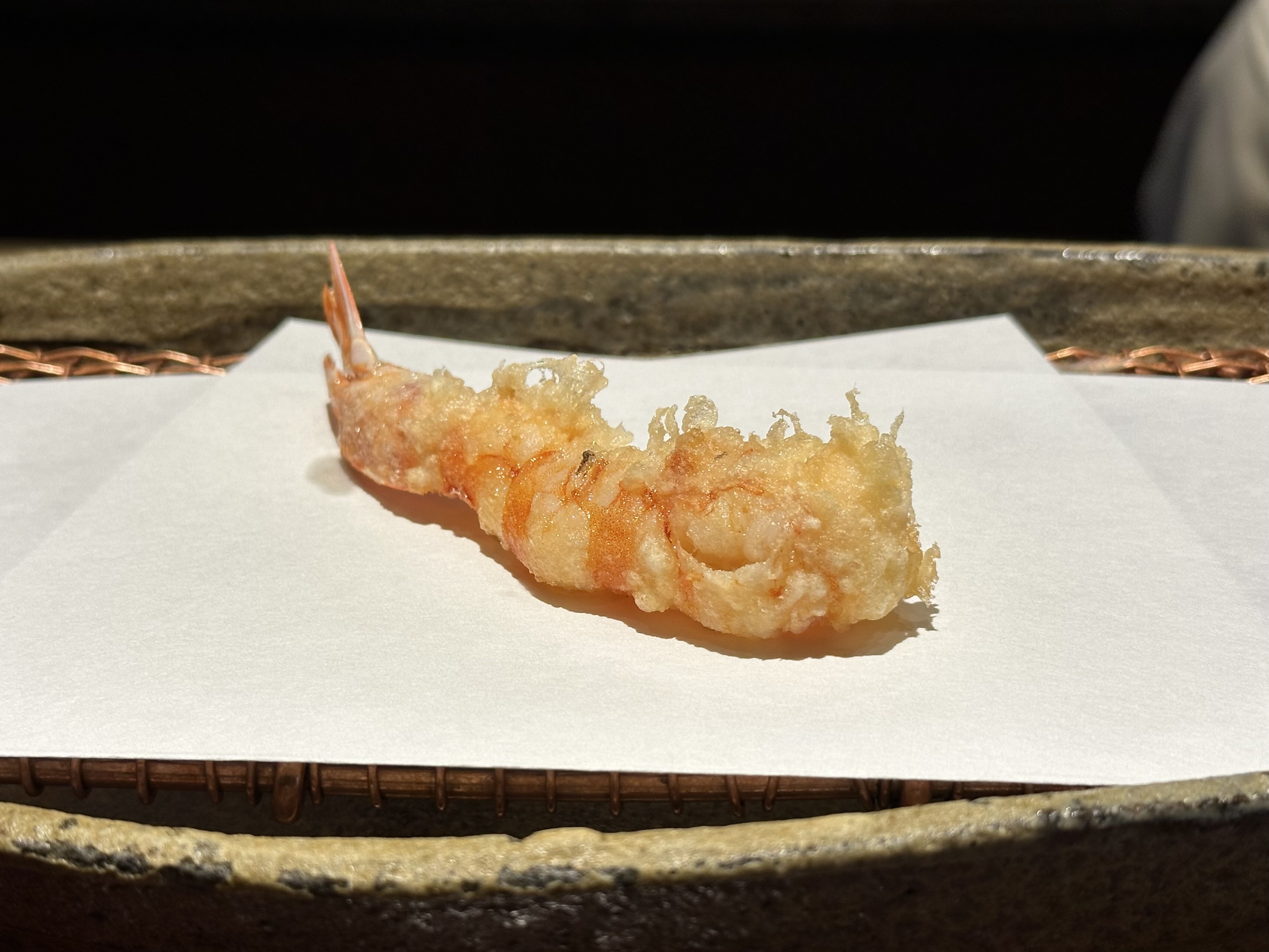
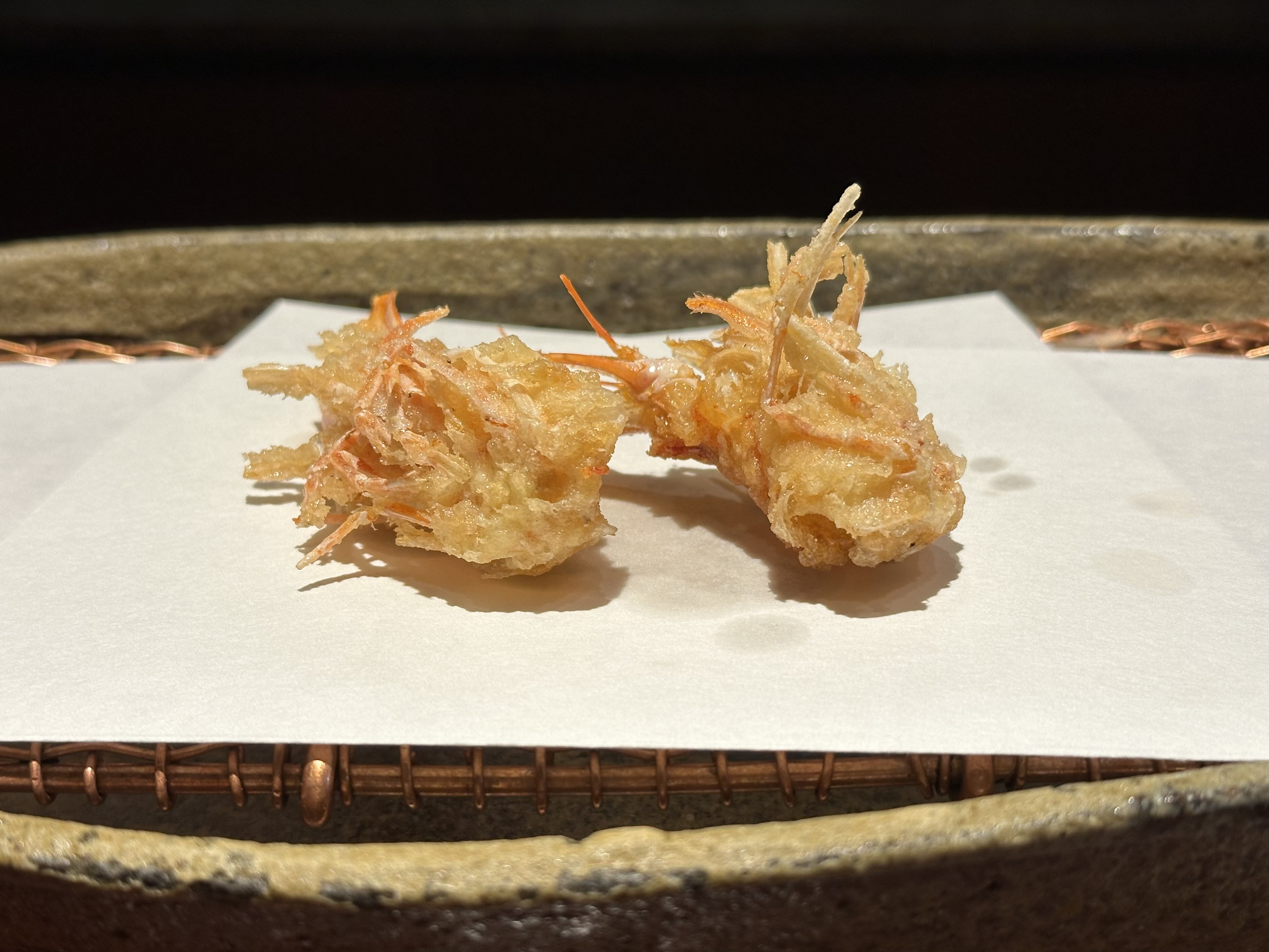
Kuruma-ebi head and body as tempura

The species was first described by Charles Spence Bate in 1888 as "Penaeus canaliculatus var. japonicus". In 1971, N. M. Tirmizi established a new subgenus of Penaeus for P. japonicus, and raised to the rank of genus by Isabel Pérez Farfante and Brian Kensley in 1997. M. japonicus remained the only species in the genus. Chan (2023) classified Marsupenaeus as one of eleven subgenera of Penaeus sensu lato.

Common names for the species include "kuruma shrimp", "kuruma prawn" and "Japanese tiger prawn".

== Importance ==
M. japonicus is considered "one of the most economically important members of the family Penaeidae". In its introduced range, it is the subject of fishing by trawling in the eastern Mediterranean, especially around the Gulf of İskenderun. It is also fished in various parts of its natural range, but its greatest importance is in aquaculture; since 2003, more than 38,000 tonnes (84,000,000 lb) have been produced in shrimp farms annually, and the value of the annual catch exceeds US$200 million.
