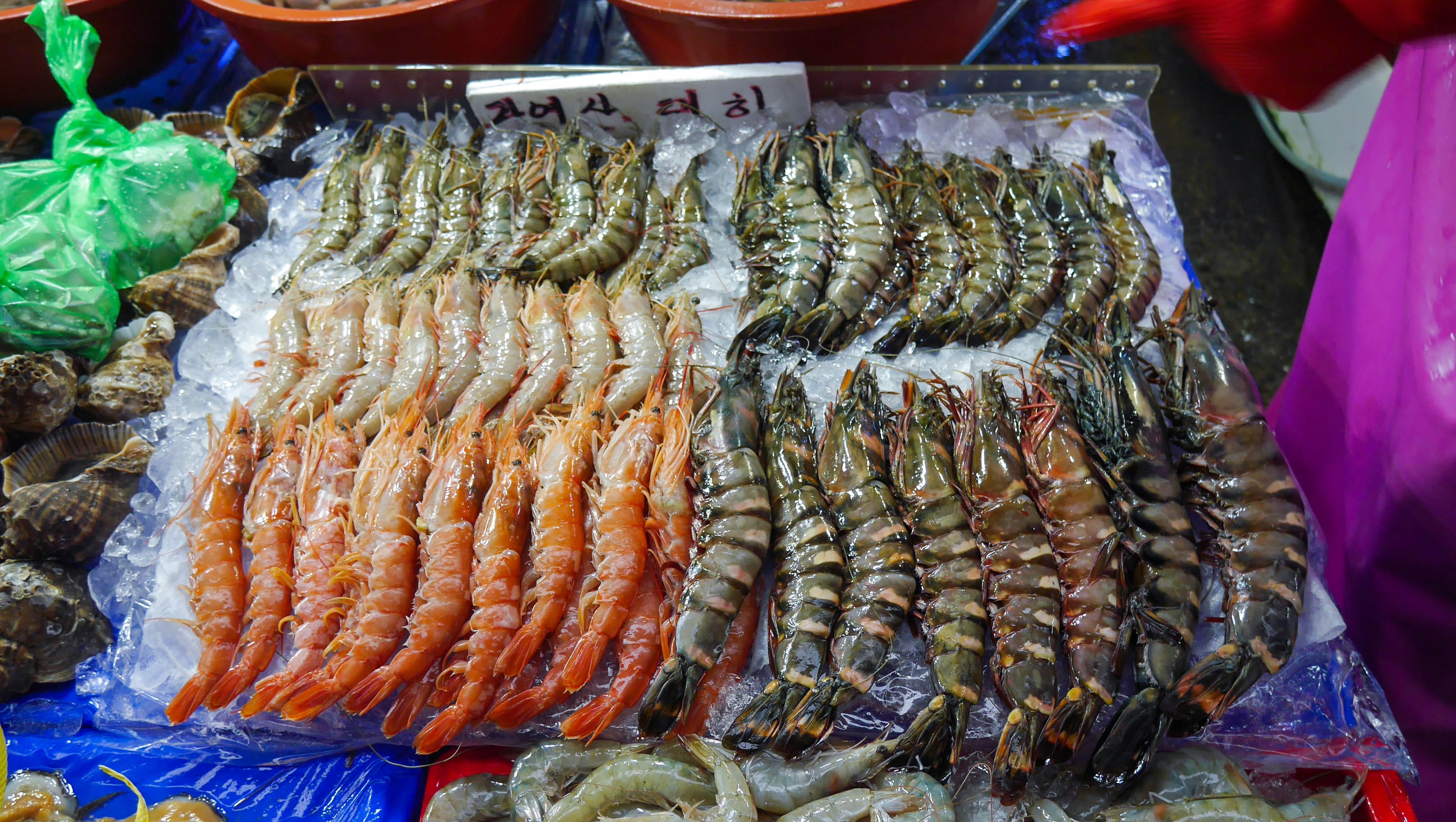
- Fleshy prawns being sold at Noryangjin Fish Market, South Korea

Scientific classification
- Kingdom: Animalia
- Phylum: Arthropoda
- Clade: Pancrustacea
- Class: Malacostraca
- Order: Decapoda
- Suborder: Dendrobranchiata
- Family: Penaeidae
- Genus: Penaeus
- Subgenus: Fenneropenaeus
- Species: F. chinensis

Binomial name
- Fenneropenaeus chinensis (Osbeck, 1765)

Synonyms
- Cancer chinensis Osbeck, 1765; Penaeus chinensis (Osbeck, 1765); Penaeus orientalis Kishinouye, 1917

= Chinese white shrimp =

Species of crustacean

The Chinese white shrimp, oriental shrimp, or fleshy prawn (Fenneropenaeus chinensis) is a species of shrimp. It is cultivated at an industrial level off mainland China. Production was devastated by a series of epidemics in the 1990s and early 2000s. Its wild capture has since recovered and expanded, but it is now farmed at lower levels than previously.

It was formerly known as Cancer chinensis, Penaeus chinensis and Penaeus orientalis, but has been reassigned to Fenneropenaeus.

== Conservation status ==
In response to the decimation of the species due to disease and overfishing, China began releasing juvenile F. chinensis in an effort to increase the corresponding annual catch starting in 1984. The program produced considerable results, with an average release of approximately 600 million and catch of 720 tonnes annually as of 2006.
