= Shrimp farming =

Breeding shrimp for food

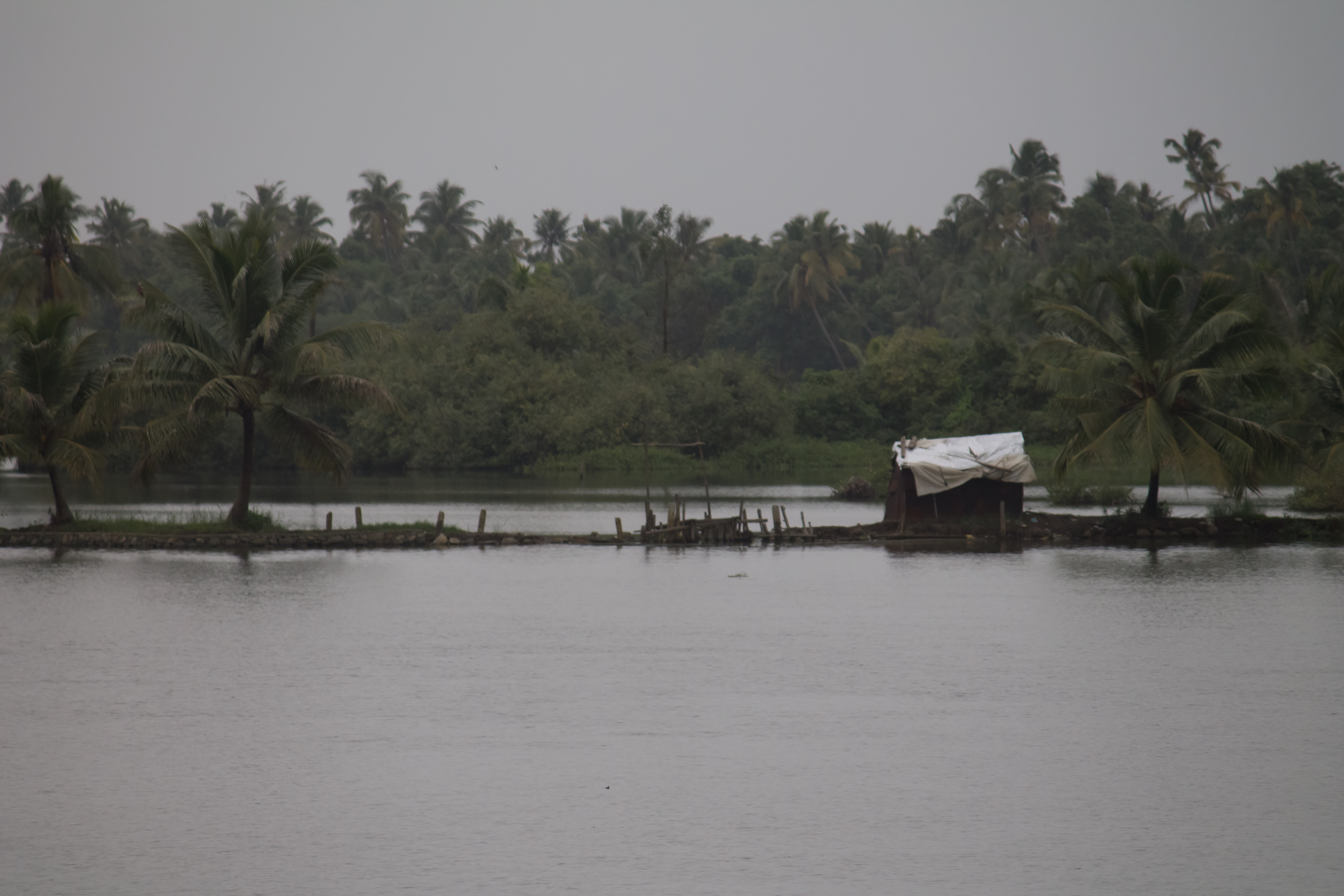
The gate of a traditional shrimp farm in Kerala, India which uses the tide to harvest shrimp

Shrimp farming is a form of aquaculture that takes place in marine or freshwater environments, producing shrimp or prawns (Note: The terminology may be confusing as different agencies draw different distinctions between "shrimp" and "prawns".) (crustaceans of the groups Caridea or Dendrobranchiata) for human consumption. However, the industry has raised concerns about environmental damage to mangrove ecosystems, reliance on slave labor, and animal welfare issues.

== Marine ==
Commercial marine shrimp farming began in the 1970s, and production grew steeply, particularly to match the market demands of the United States, Japan, and Western Europe. The total global production of farmed shrimp reached more than 2.1 million tonnes in 1991, representing a value of nearly US$9 billion. About 30% of farmed shrimp is produced in Asia, particularly in China and Indonesia. The other 54.1% is produced mainly in Latin America, where Brazil, Ecuador, and Mexico are the largest producers. In 2020, Ecuador became the largest shrimp exporter in the world, followed by India, Vietnam and Indonesia.

Shrimp farming has changed from traditional, small-scale businesses in Southeast Asia into a global industry. Technological advances have led to growing shrimp at ever higher densities, and broodstock is shipped worldwide. Virtually all farmed shrimp are of the family Penaeidae, and just two species—Litopenaeus vannamei (Pacific white shrimp) 70% and Penaeus monodon (giant tiger prawn) 20%— account for roughly 90% of all farmed shrimp.

These industrial monocultures used to be very susceptible to diseases, which caused several regional wipe-outs of farm shrimp populations in past decades. Increasing ecological problems, repeated disease outbreaks, and pressure and criticism from NGOs, consumer countries and even producers themselves, led to changes in the industry in the late 1990s and generally stronger regulation by governments.

In 1999, a program aimed at developing and promoting more sustainable farming practices was initiated, including governmental bodies, industry representatives, and environmental organizations.

== Freshwater ==
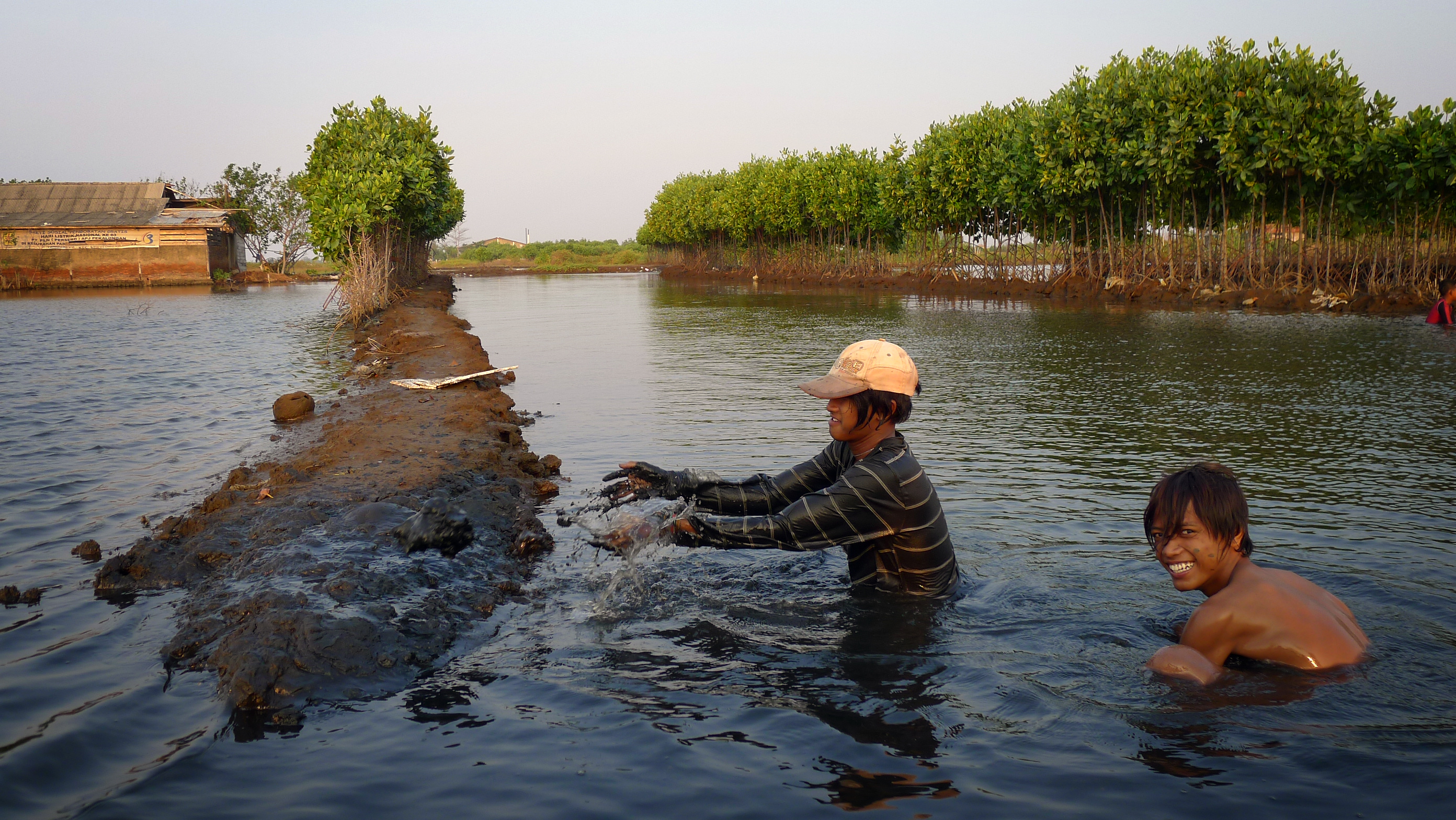
A farmer constructing a shrimp farm in Pekalongan, Indonesia

Freshwater prawn farming shares many characteristics with, and many of the same problems as, marine shrimp farming. Unique problems are introduced by the developmental lifecycle of the main species (the giant river prawn, Macrobrachium rosenbergii). The global annual production of freshwater prawns in 2010 was about 670,000 tons, of which China produced 615,000 tons (92%).

== Animal welfare ==
Eyestalk ablation

Eyestalk ablation is the removal of one (unilateral) or both (bilateral) eyestalks from a crustacean. It is routinely practiced on female shrimps (or prawns) in almost every marine shrimp maturation or reproduction facility in the world, but has faced increasing criticism in recent years. The aim of ablation is to stimulate the female shrimp to develop mature ovaries and spawn.

Poor captive conditions for shrimp cause inhibitions in females that prevent them from developing mature ovaries. Even in conditions where a given species will develop ovaries and spawn in captivity, use of eyestalk ablation increases total egg production and increases the percentage of females in a given population that will participate in reproduction. Once females have been subjected to eyestalk ablation, complete ovarian development often ensues within as little as 3 to 10 days.

Eyestalk ablation has faced criticism from animal welfare advocates. Alternatives such as higher quality feed, and maintaining a 2:1 sex ratio of female to male shrimp within tanks have been found effective, but are not yet widespread.

=== Slaughter methods ===
Shrimp are commonly slaughtered using the ice slurry method, in which they are immersed in a mixture of ice and water with the aim of inducing thermal shock. However, animal welfare organizations have raised concerns that this method is often ineffective, leading instead to death by asphyxiation and prolonged suffering. In response to growing ethical concerns, more humane alternatives have been explored. Electrical stunning is currently considered the most humane pre-slaughter method available for shrimp, as it renders them unconscious significantly faster and more effectively than ice slurry or asphyxiation. In 2022, the United Kingdom legally recognized decapod crustaceans, including shrimp, as sentient beings capable of experiencing pain, further reinforcing the need for improved welfare practices during slaughter.

=== Animal welfare initiatives in shrimp farming ===
In recent years, animal welfare groups have intensified their campaigns to improve shrimp farming standards. Mercy for Animals led the world's first public demonstration for shrimp welfare, prompting Tesco in 2024 to commit to banning eyestalk ablation and ice-slurry stunning, replacing them with 100% electrical stunning for key species, Penaeus vannamei and Penaeus monodon, by 2027. The UK-based Shrimp Welfare Project supports humane slaughter practices globally by providing free electrical stunners to producers and encouraging broader adoption of electrical stunning alongside efforts to eliminate eyestalk ablation. Similarly, the International Council for Animal Welfare (ICAW) has urged retailers, including Tesco, Marks & Spencer, Sainsbury's, Ocado, Waitrose, and Co‑op, to end ice-slurry slaughter and eyestalk ablation and to implement electrical stunning in their supply chains.

== See also ==
- Exploitation and conservation of mangroves
- Pain in invertebrates
- Integrated mangrove-shrimp aquaculture: creates less destruction of mangroves in mangrove-areas, subjected to tidal flow reducing disease
- Integrated multi-trophic aquaculture: can be used to reduce diseases compared to when closed-ponds systems are used
