= King prawn =

King prawn may refer to:

- In Australia, several species of commercially significant edible prawns (shrimp) in the genus Penaeus (also classified in Melicertus, which is now considered polyphyletic):
  - Penaeus (Oleopenaeus) plebejus (Hess, 1865) – eastern king prawn;
  - Penaeus (Oleopenaeus) latisulcatus (Kishinouye, 1896) – western king prawn;
  - Penaeus (Ischiopeneaus) longistylus (Kubo, 1943) – red-spot king prawn.
- Other large prawns of various species (often Penaeus (Litopenaeus) vannamei, the white-leg shrimp also called vannamei prawn).
- Pepe the King Prawn, a Muppets character performed by Bill Barretta.
- King Prawn (band), an English ska punk band active 1993–2003 and 2012.
- Fairy King Prawn (靚蝦王), a racehorse.
