= Pink shrimp =

Pink shrimp may refer to any of the following species:

- Pandalus borealis
- Pandalus montagui
- Pandalus jordani, a shrimp in the genus Pandalus
- Farfantepenaeus brevirostris, a shrimp in the genus Farfantepenaeus
- Metapenaeus monoceros

== See also ==
- Southern pink shrimp, Farfantepenaeus notialis
- Northern pink shrimp, Farfantepenaeus duorarum
