= Flora and fauna of Odisha =

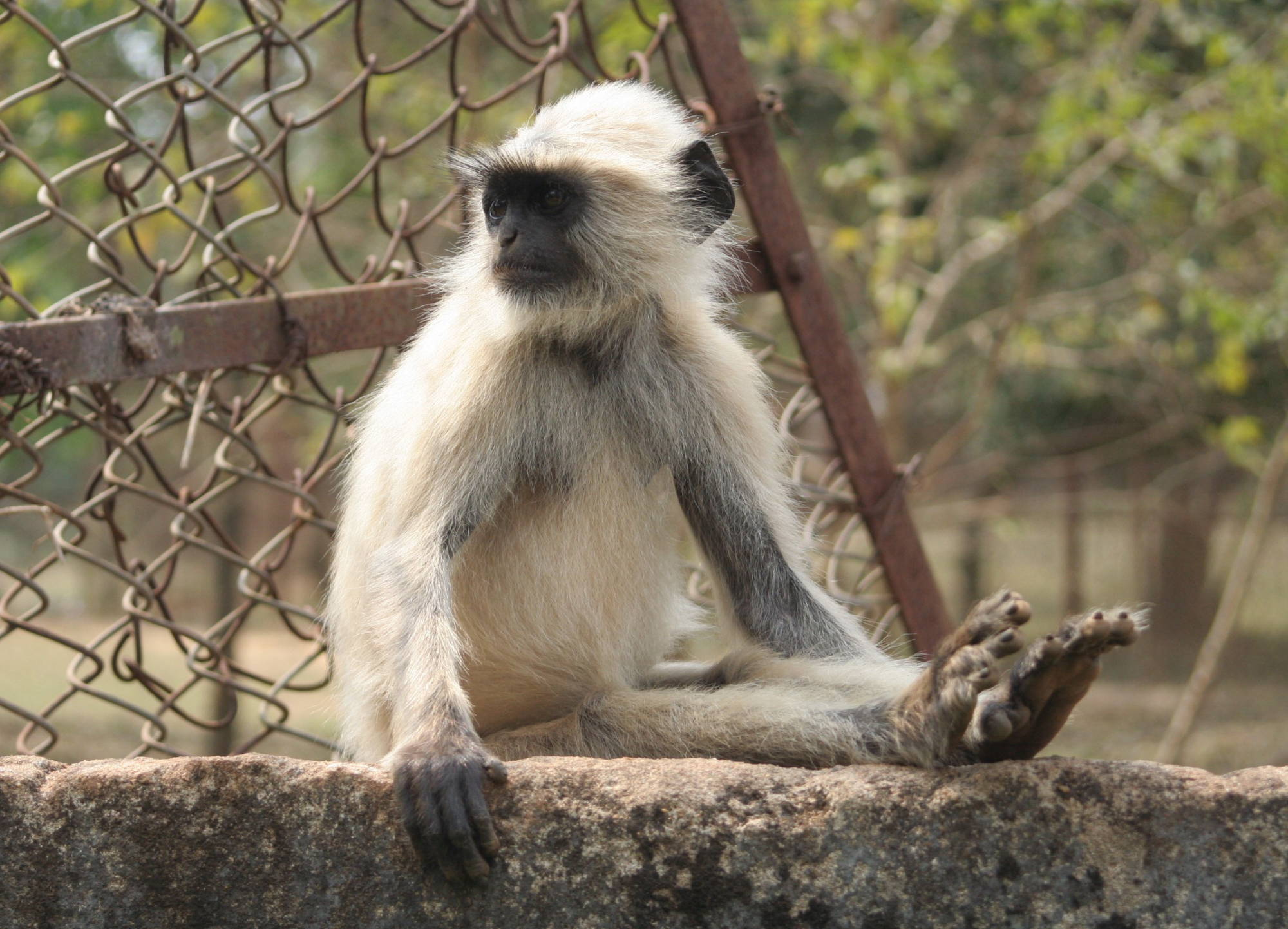
A langur

Odisha, a state in eastern India, is extremely diverse and gives the state abundance of natural beauty and wildlife. The districts in the interior are thickly covered by tropical moist deciduous and tropical dry deciduous forests. The hills, plateaus and isolated areas of the northeastern part of the state are covered by the tropical moist deciduous forests whereas the dry deciduous forests are located in the southwest region of the state. Some of the trees which grow in abundance in Odisha are bamboo, teak, rosewood, sal, piasal, sanghvan and haldi. There are 479 species of birds, 86 species of mammals, 19 species of amphibians and 110 species of reptiles present in Odisha. The state is also an important habitat for the endangered olive ridley turtles and Irrawaddy dolphins. Koraput district of southern Odisha has been identified by Food and Agriculture Organisation (FAO) of UN as Global Agricultural Heritage site which is among only other three sites in the world. Other sites are in Peru, China and Philippines.

== Forest ==
Almost one-third of Odisha is covered by forests which make up about 37.34% of the total land area of the state. These forests cover most of southern and western Odisha. The eastern plains adjacent to the coast are covered by farmlands.

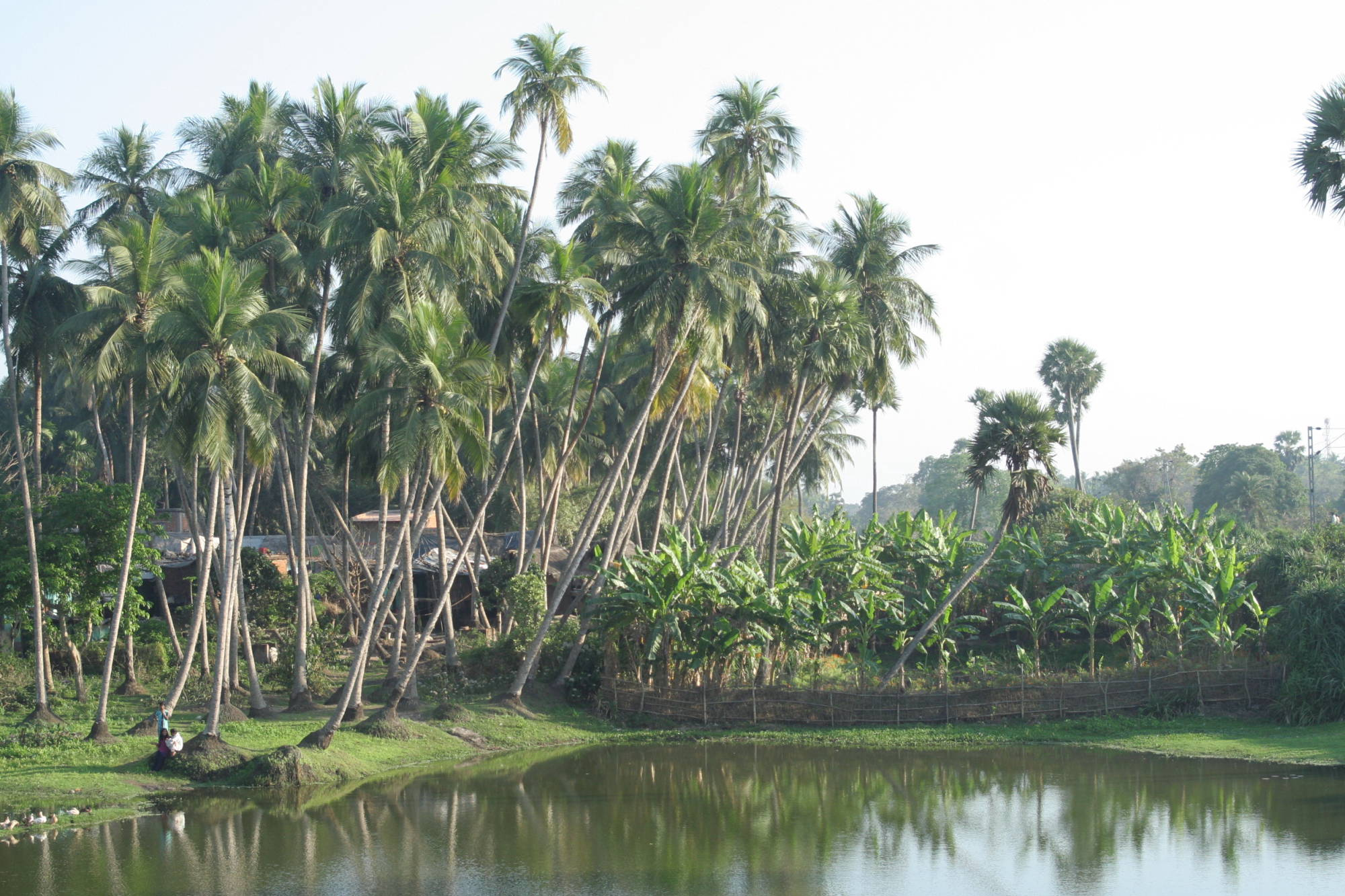
Forest cover, Raghurajpur, Odisha

The forest cover of Odisha extends over an area of 58,136.869 square kilometres out of which reserve forests make up an area of 26,329.12 square kilometres (10,165.73 mi^{2}), demarcated protected forests make up 11,687.079 square kilometres (4,512.406 mi^{2}) and undemarcated protected forests make up 3,638.78 square kilometres (1,404.94 mi^{2}). Other types of forests make up 16,261.34 square kilometres (6,278.54 mi^{2}) while unclassed forests make up 20.55 square kilometres (7.93 mi^{2}) of the total forest cover. Bon Jour The State Government of Odisha also classifies forests based on their density. About 538 square kilometres (208 mi^{2}) of land are classified as very dense forests with a canopy density of over 86 percent, 27,656 square kilometres (10,678 mi^{2}) of forests are classified as moderately dense cover with a canopy density of 50 to 70 percent and 20,180 square kilometres (7,790 mi^{2}) of land are classified as an open forest with a canopy density of 10 to 40 percent.

Odisha is the vast state of plants and animals. Odisha's forests yield large quantities of teak and bamboo. Teak, apart from medicinal plants and Kendu leaves contribute substantially towards Odisha's economy. Odisha's forest ecosystem has been greatly affected by deforestation and illegal smuggling and poaching. The state government has established the Odisha Forest Development Corporation to combat the means of smuggling. The State Pollution Control Board has brought a set of rules to force in order to combat environmental pollution.

== Chilika Lake ==
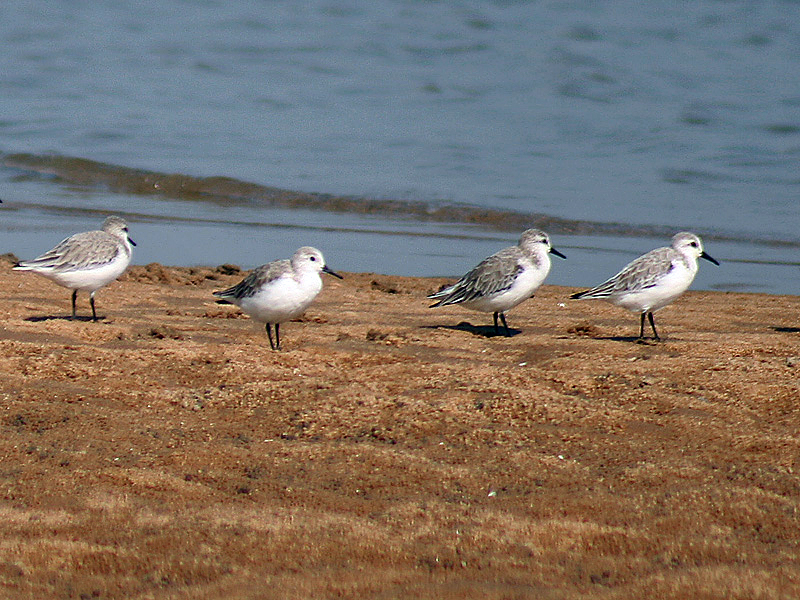
Sanderlings at Chilka Lake

In 1981, Chilika Lake was designated the first Indian wetland of international importance under the Ramsar Convention due to its rich biodiversity. Over a million migratory waterfowl and shorebirds winter here including many rare and endangered species. The lake is of great value in preserving genetic diversity and over 400 vertebrate species have been recorded. However conflicts have arisen over the ecosystem of the lake such as Siltation, and disagreements between fisherman, resulting in an overall loss of biodiversity. As a result, the Odisha State Government with support from the Government of India adopt adaptive conservation and management actions. In 1992, the Government of Odisha, concerned by the degradation of the lake's ecosystem, established the Chilika Development Authority (CDA) for the restoration and overall development of the lake under the Indian Societies Registration Act. An Integrated Management Plan was later implemented with financial support of ₹570 million (US$12.7 million) and Hydrobiological monitoring was supported under the Odisha Water Resources Consolidation Project of the World Bank, to the extent of Rs 10 million (US$220,000). A strong support network was created with 7 state government organisations, 33 NGOs, 3 National Government Ministries, 6 other organisations, 11 International organisations, 13 research institutions and 55 different categories of community groups established good international contacts for protection in the area.

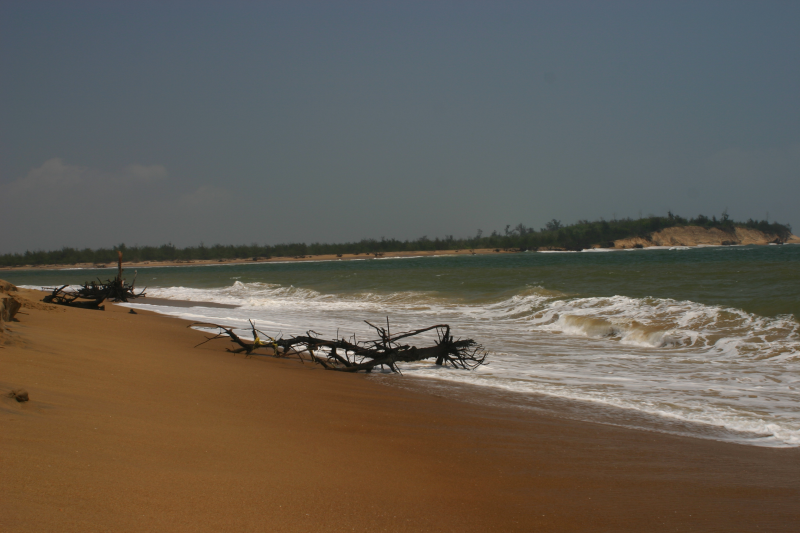
Chilika Sea mouth

In November 2002, the Ramsar Wetland Conservation Award was presented to the Chilika Development Authority for "outstanding achievements in the field of restoration and wise use of wetlands and effective participation of local communities in these activities".

The ecological richness of the lake is of great value in preserving the genetic diversity because of the multiplicity of its habitat, flora and fauna. (Some are pictured in the photo gallery). The Zoological Survey of India (ZSI) surveyed the lake between 1985 and 1988 and identified 800 species of fauna, including many rare, endangered, threatened and vulnerable species, but excluding terrestrial insects.

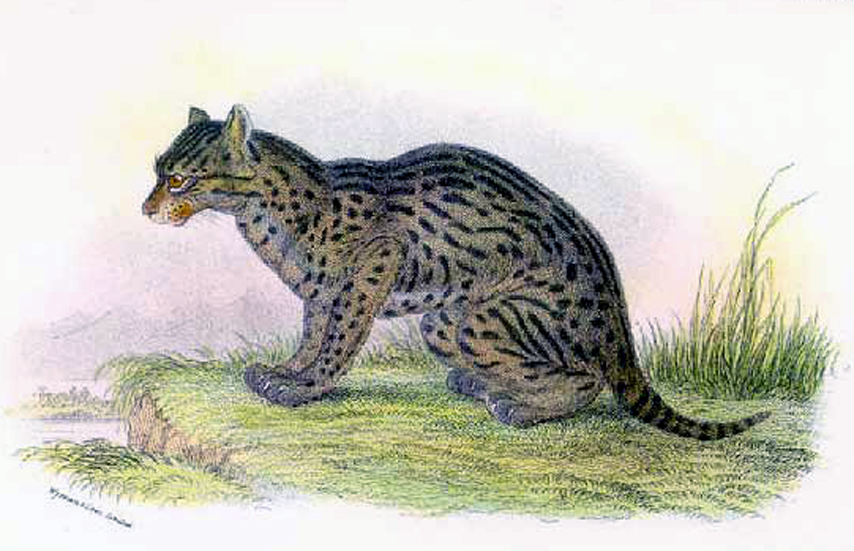
Fishing cat, Prionailurus viverrinus

The rare and threatened animal species identified are green sea turtle (EN), dugong (VU), Irrawaddy dolphin (VU), blackbuck (NT), spoon billed sandpiper (CR), limbless skink and fishing cat (EN). 24 mammalian species were reported. 37 species of reptiles and amphibians are also reported.

== Flora ==
Recent surveys revealed an overall 726 species of flowering plants belonging to 496 genera and 120 families. This represents about one–fourth of the vascular plant species of the Odisha state where some 2900 species altogether are found. Fabaceae is the most dominant plant family followed by Poaceae and Cyperaceae. Certain species were found to be characteristic of specific islands. Important species identified are:.

- Leguminosae, Poaceae, and Cyperaceae
- Endemic cassipourea ceylanica
- Five species of seagrass
- Wild plants of horticultural importance and interesting plant groups such as insectivorous plants, epiphytes, parasites and lithophytes
- Mangrove associates, such as Aegiceras corniculatus, Excoecaria agalloch, Salvadora persica, Pongamia pinnata, Colubrina asiatica, Capparis roxburghii, Macrotyloma ciliatum and many others.

== Fauna ==
Chilika Lake is the largest wintering ground for migratory birds, on the Indian sub-continent. It is one of the hotspots of biodiversity in the country. Some species listed in the IUCN Red List of Threatened Species inhabit the lake for at least part of their lifecycle.

Migratory water fowl arrive here from as far as the Caspian Sea, Baikal Lake and remote parts of Russia, Mongolia, Lakah, Siberia, Iran, Iraq, Afghanistan and from the Himalayas. A census conducted in the winter of 1997–98 recorded about 2 million birds in the lake.

In 2007, nearly 840,000 birds visited the lake, out of which 198,000 were spotted in Nalbana Island. On 5 January 2008, a bird census involving 85 wildlife officials counted 900,000 birds of which 450,000 were sighted in Nalabana. Removal of invasive species of freshwater aquatic plants, especially water hyacinth, due to restoration of salinity, is a contributing factor for the recent increasing attraction of birds to the lake.

Nalbana Island is the core area of the Ramsar designated wetlands of Chilika Lake. Nalbana means a weed covered island In the Odia language.... It is a major island in the centre of the lake and has an area of 15.53 km^{2} (6.0 mi^{2}). The island gets completely submerged during the monsoon season. As the monsoon recedes in the winter, lake levels decrease and the island is gradually exposed, birds flock to the island in large numbers to feed on its extensive mudflats. Nalbana was notified in 1987 and declared a bird sanctuary in 1973 under the Wildlife Protection Act.

Large flocks of greater flamingos from Iran and the Rann of Kutch in Gujarat, feed in the shallow waters of the lake. Other-long legged waders seen around Nalbana Island are the lesser flamingos, Goliath herons, grey herons, and purple herons, egrets, spoonbills, storks and black-headed ibis.

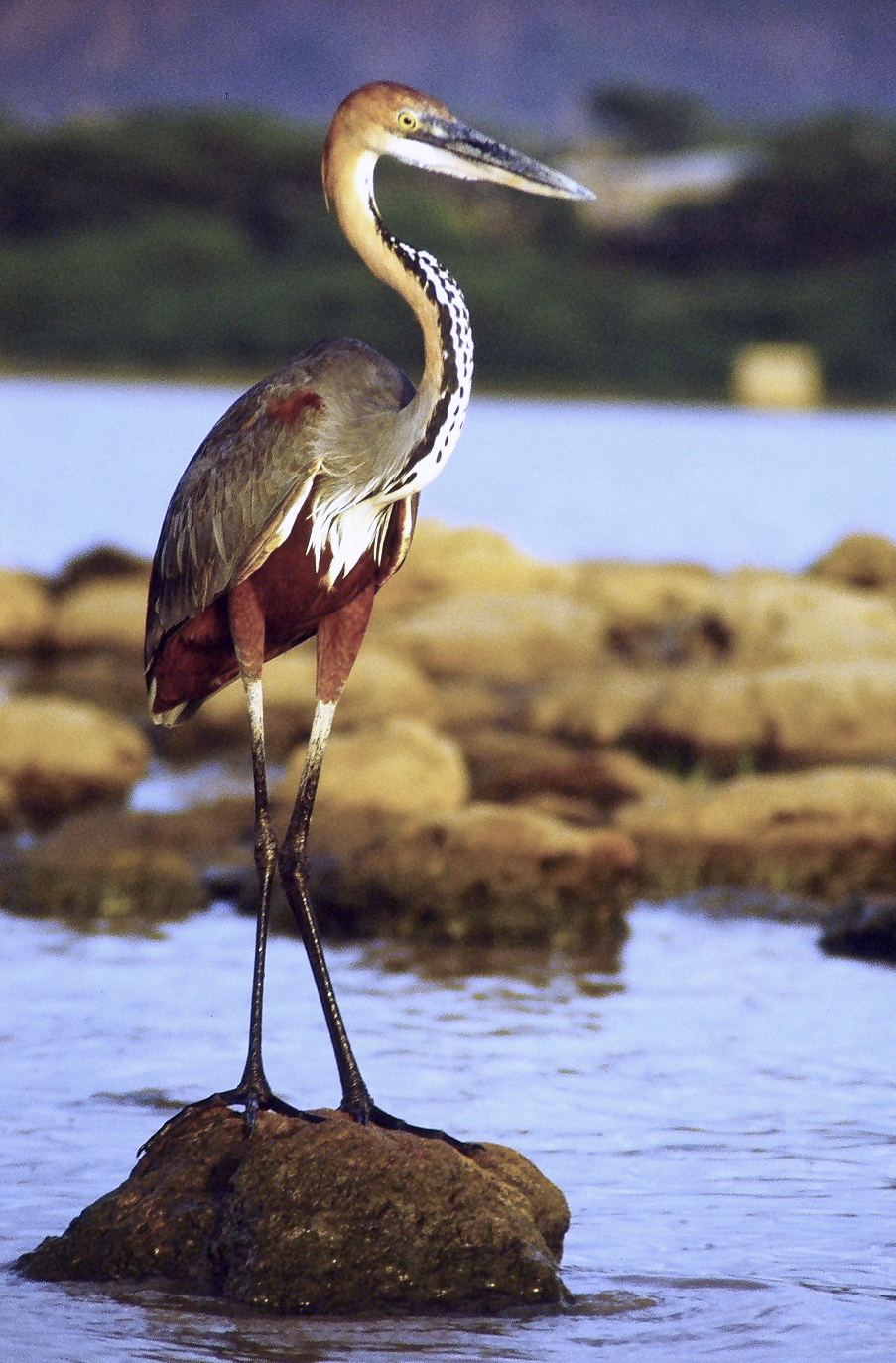
Goliath heron

Rare birds reported in the lake are Asiatic dowitchers (NT), Dalmatian pelican (VU), Pallas's fish-eagles (VU), the very rare migrant spoon-billed sandpiper (CR) and spot-billed pelican (NT).

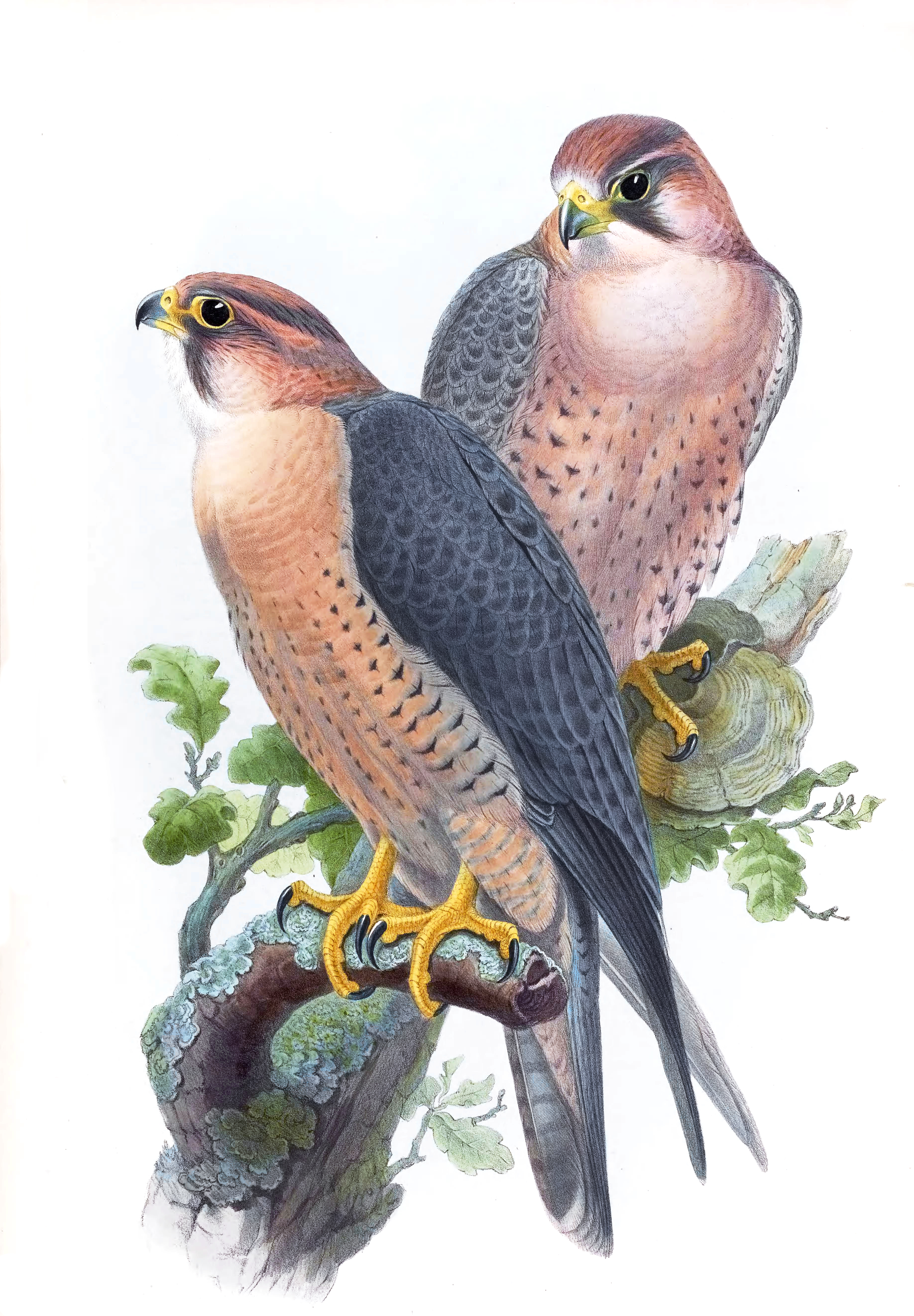
Peregrine falcon sub-species, Falco peregrinus babylonicus

The white-bellied sea eagle, pariah kite, brahminy kites, kestrel, marsh harriers, and the world's most widespread bird of prey, the peregrine falcon, are among the raptors seen here.

Many short-legged shorebirds are seen in a narrow band along the shifting shores of the lake and islands. These include plovers, the collared pratincole, ruff, dunlin, snipes and sandpipers. larks, wagtails and lapwings are also found on the mudflats. Feeding in deeper water are the longer-legged avocets, stilts and godwits.

The higher vegetated areas of the lake support moorhens, coots and jacanas. Pond herons and night herons can be seen along the shores with kingfishers and rollers. Little cormorants are seen on perches around the lake. Compact flocks of brahminy ducks, as well as shovellers, pintails, gadwall, teals, pochards, geese and coots, are also seen.

Nesting colonies of gull-billed terns and river terns are seen on the Nalabana Island. In 2002, the Bombay Natural History Society survey recorded 540 nests of the Indian river tern at the island, the largest nesting colony in the southeast Asia.

As per the Chilika Development Authority's (CDA) updated data (2002), 323 aquatic species, which includes 261 fish species, 28 prawns and 34 crabs are reported out of which sixty five species breed in the lake. 27 species are freshwater fishes and two genera of prawns. The remaining species migrate to the sea to breed. 21 species of herrings and sardines of the family Clupeidae are reported.

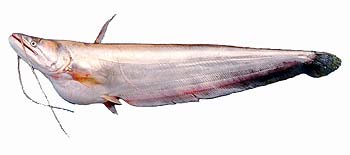
Wallago attu – A common type of fish in the lake

Between 1998 and 2002, 40 fish species were recorded here for the first time and following the reopening of the lake mouth in 2000, six threatened species have reappeared, including:

- Milk fish (Seba khainga),
- Indo-Pacific tarpon (Panialehio),
- Ten pounder (Nahama),
- Bream (Kala khuranti),
- Hilsa (ilishi) and
- Mullet (Kekenda)

Commercial fisheries

For centuries fisher folk evolved exclusive rights of fishing through a complex system of partitioning the fisheries of the lake, harvested the lake in a relatively sustainable fashion and developed a large range of fishing techniques, nets and gear.

During the British rule, in 1897–98, fishermen community enjoyed exclusive fisheries rights in the lake. The fisheries of the lake were part of the Zamindari estates of Khallikote, Parikud, Suna Bibi, Mirza Taher Baig and the Chaudhary families of Bhungarpur and the Khas mahal areas of Khurda, lying within the kingdoms of the Rajas of Parikud and Khallikote. The zamindars (Landlords) leased out the fisheries exclusively to the local fisherfolk.

With the abolition of zamindari (land lordship) system in 1953, traditional fishing areas continued to be leased out to cooperatives of local fishermen. Fishing, particularly, prawn fishing, became increasingly remunerative with outside interest playing an important role. But in 1991, when the government of Odisha proposed a leasing policy that would have resulted in the auction of leases to the highest bidder, fishermen's cooperatives challenged the order in court. The High Court of Odisha ordered the Government to enact changes that would protect the interests of traditional fishermen and since then no new leases have been reported. This has resulted in a chaotic regime in which powerful vested interests from outside dominate, and the local people have been subordinated.

Butter catfish and Wallago attu are the most common type of fish found in the lake. 11 species of fish, 5 species of prawn and 2 crab species are commercially important. The commercially important prawn are giant tiger prawn, Penaeus indicus (Indian white shrimp), Metapenaeus monoceros (speckled shrimp), Metapenaeus affinis (pink prawn) and Metapenaeus dobson (Kadal shrimp). Mangrove crab is the most important commercial crab. Fish landings in the lake, which fluctuated in the past, have recorded a remarkable recovery after the opening of the new mouth and dredging of silt –choked old mouth Magarmukh in 2000–2001, resulted in a better intermixing of the tidal influx from the sea and freshwater inflow from rivers. Against an all time lowest landing of fish and prawn of 1269 MT 1,269 t (1,398.8 short tons) in 1995–96, the all-time high is reported to be 11,878 t (13,093.3 short tons) during 2001–2002 resulting in an estimated per capita income for the fisher folk of Rs 19,575 (about US$392) during the year. Recently, the Government of Odisha have issued a notification banning the lease of Chilika Lake for Culture Fishery.

Dolphins

The Irrawaddy dolphin (Orcaella brevirostris) is the flagship species of Chilika lake. Chilka is home to the only known population of Irrawaddy dolphins in India and one of only two lagoons in the world that are home to this species. It is classified as Critically Endangered, in five of the six other places it is known to live.

A small population of bottlenose dolphins, also migrate into the lagoon from the sea. Chilika fishermen say that when Irrawaddy dolphins and bottlenose dolphins meet in the outer channel, the former get frightened and are forced to return toward the lake.

Some Irrawaddy dolphins used to be sighted only along the inlet channel and in a limited portion of the central sector of the lake. After the opening of the new mouth at Satapada in 2000, they are now well distributed in the central and the southern sector of the lake. The number of dolphins sighted has varied from 50 to 170. A 2006 census counted 131 dolphins and the 2007 census revealed 138 dolphins. Out of the 138 dolphins, 115 were adults, 17 adolescents and six calves. 60 adults were spotted in the outer channel followed by 32 in the central sector and 23 in the southern sector.

Dolphin tourism provides an important alternative source of income for many local residents. There are four tourist associations in Satapada employing three hundred and sixty 9-HP long-tail motor boats taking tourists to a 25 km^{2} (9.7 mi^{2}) area of the lake for dolphin watching. About 500 fishing families are involved in this business. The Odisha Tourism Department and the Dolphin Motorboat Association, an NGO at Satpada, report about 40,000 tourists visit Chilika every year for dolphin Watching. October–January and May–June are the peak season for tourists at Chilika, with a maximum 600–700 per day during December–January. The Dolphin Motorboat Association has 75 8-passenger motorboats for dolphin watching. Tourists pay Rs. 250 for 60–90 minutes per trip. According to the Association, most tourists see dolphins. Only 5% return disappointed. Besides the Association, the Odisha Tourism Department organises "dolphin-watch" for tourists. Even during monsoon, about 100 tourists/day visit the lake.

Boat based dolphin watching tours impact dolphin behavior and cause several accidental dolphin deaths each year. CDA conducts an annual census of dolphin deaths. They report 15 deaths in 2003–04, 11 in 2004–05, 8 in 2005–06 and 5 in 2006–07. 40% of the 2006–07 deaths were by mechanised boats.

Since 1984, the Whale and Dolphin Conservation Society has been conducting a science-based community education project to conserve the Irrawaddy dolphins and Chilika Lake. They have determined the primary cause of mortality for this population of dolphins is floating gill nets and hook line fisheries and the secondary cause is boat strikes from increasing unmanaged tourism activities.

The Irrawaddy dolphins have a seemingly mutualistic relationship of co-operative fishing with the traditional fishermen. Fishermen recall when they would call out to the dolphins, to drive fish into their nets. Castnet fishing with the help of Irrawaddy dolphins in upper reaches of the Ayeyawady River has been well documented.

The only other sub-populations of Irrawaddy dolphins are found in a 190 km (118.1 mi) stretch of the Mekong River in Laos and Cambodia (about 70–100 freshwater individuals); in a 420 km (261.0 mi) stretch of the Mahakam River, Indonesia (about 33–50 freshwater individuals); Malampaya Sound, Philippines (about 77 individuals) and in a 370 km (229.9 mi) stretch of the Ayeyarwady River in Myanmar (about 59 freshwater individuals). Less than 50 were reported in Songkhla Lake in Thailand. With no more than 474 Irrawaddy dolphins reported worldwide in 2007, The Chilika dolphins comprise at least 29% of the total world population and are the largest subpopulation in the world.

== Gallery ==
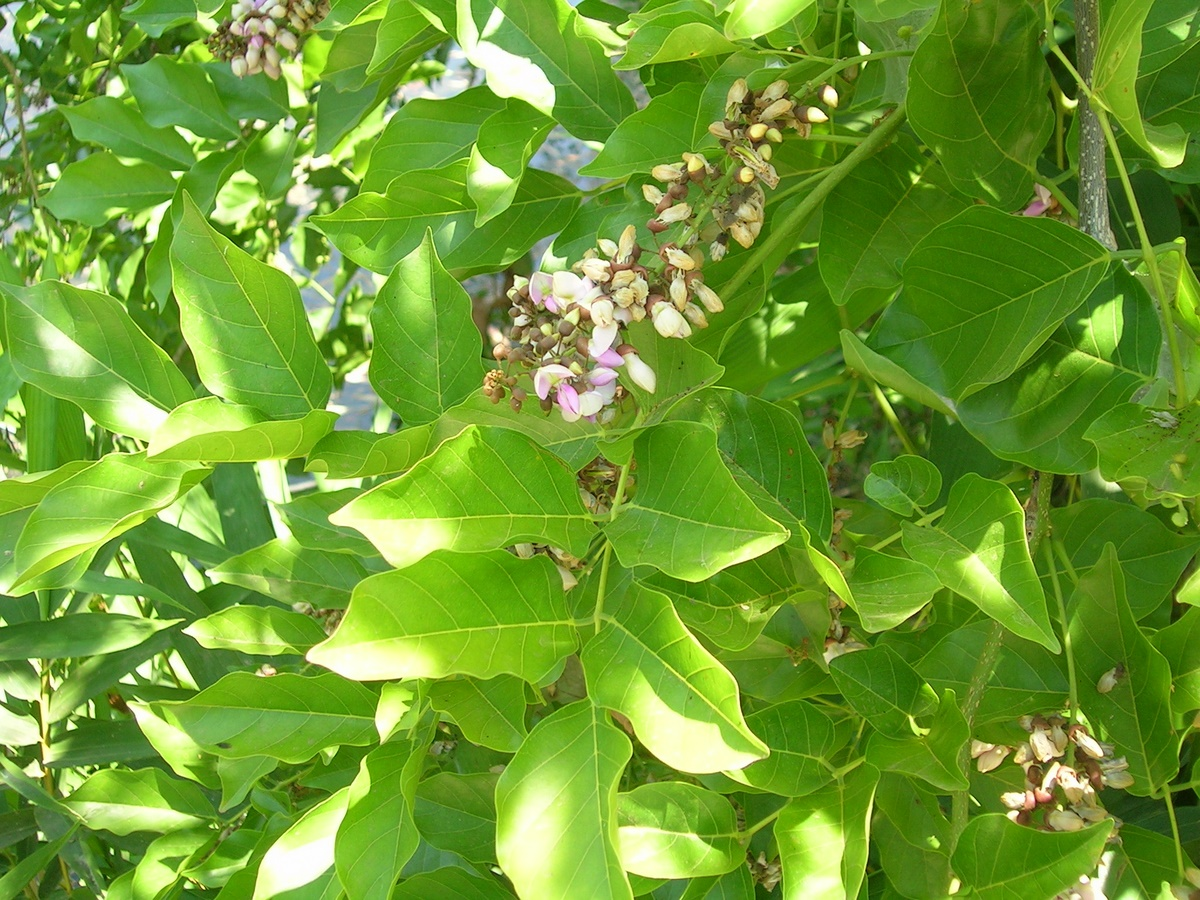
Pongamia pinnata, a flowering shoot

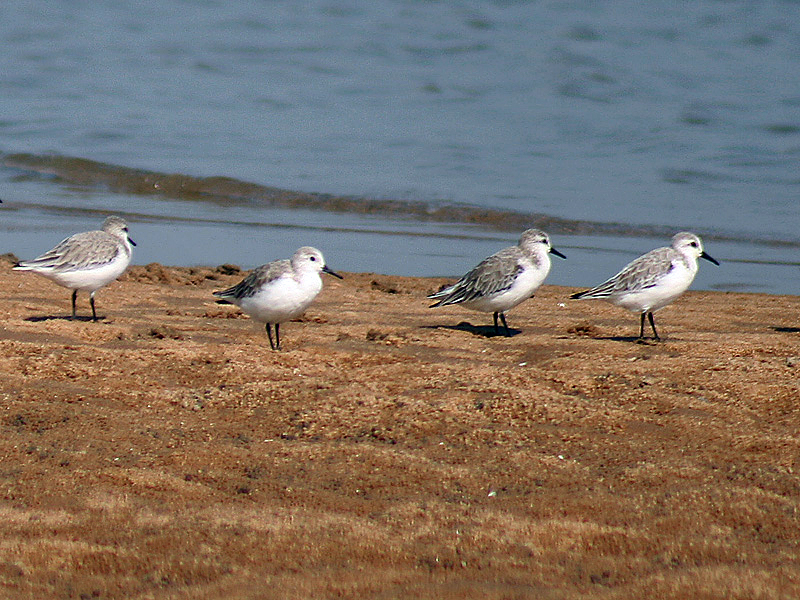
Sanderling, Calidris alba

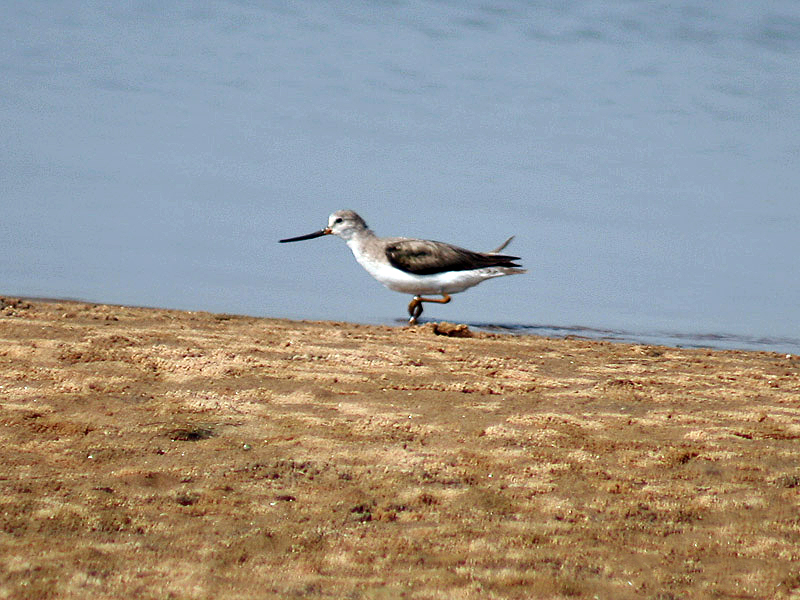
Terek sandpiper, Xenus cinereus

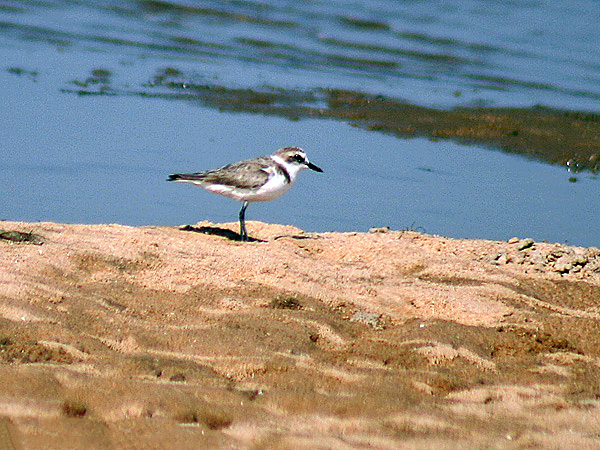
Kentish plover, Charadrius alexandrinus

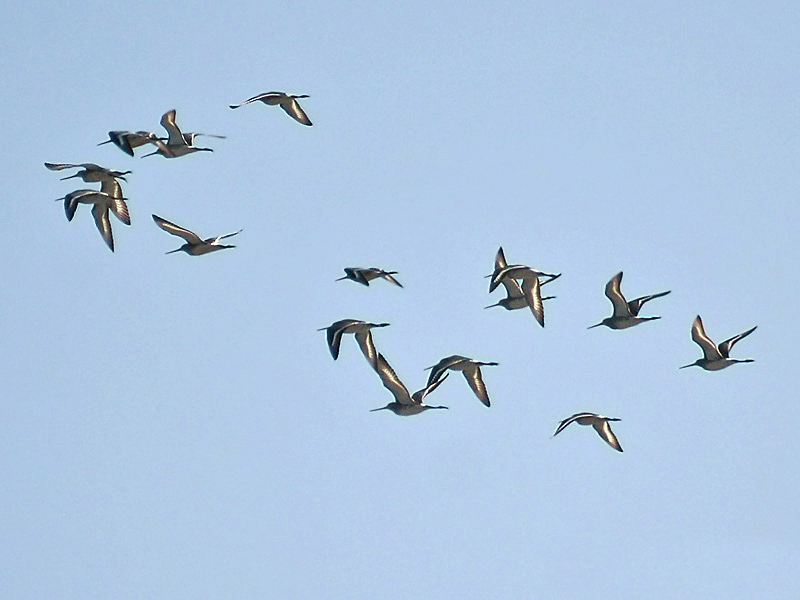
Black-tailed godwit, Limosa limosa

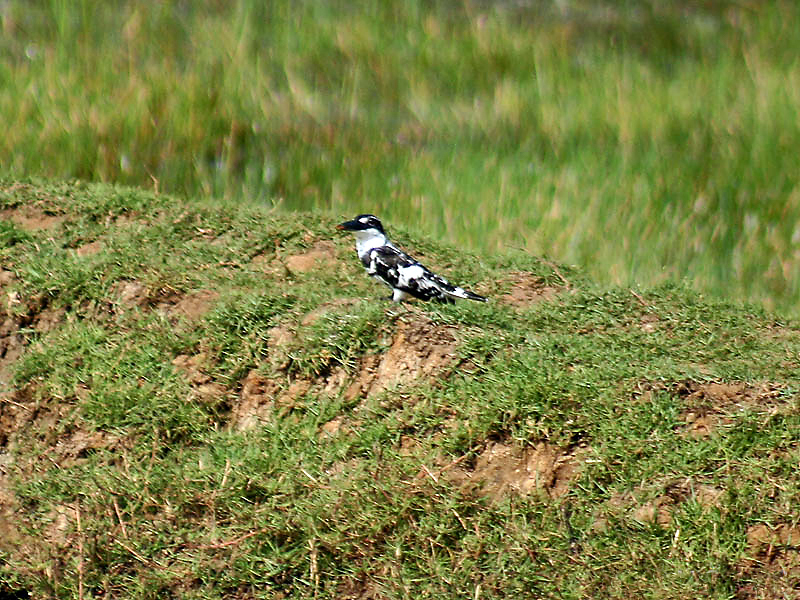
Pied kingfisher, Ceryle rudis

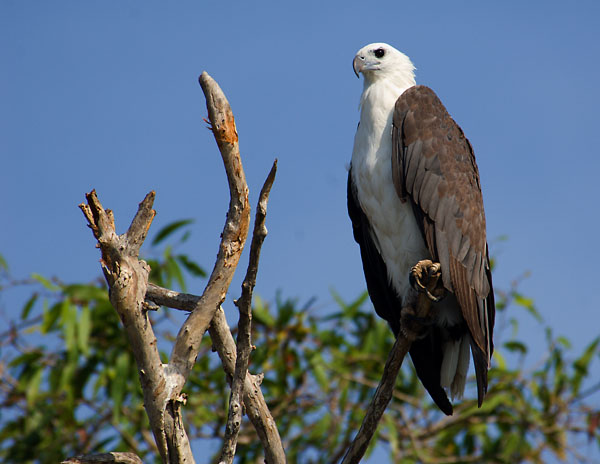
White-bellied sea eagle, Haliaeetus leucogaster

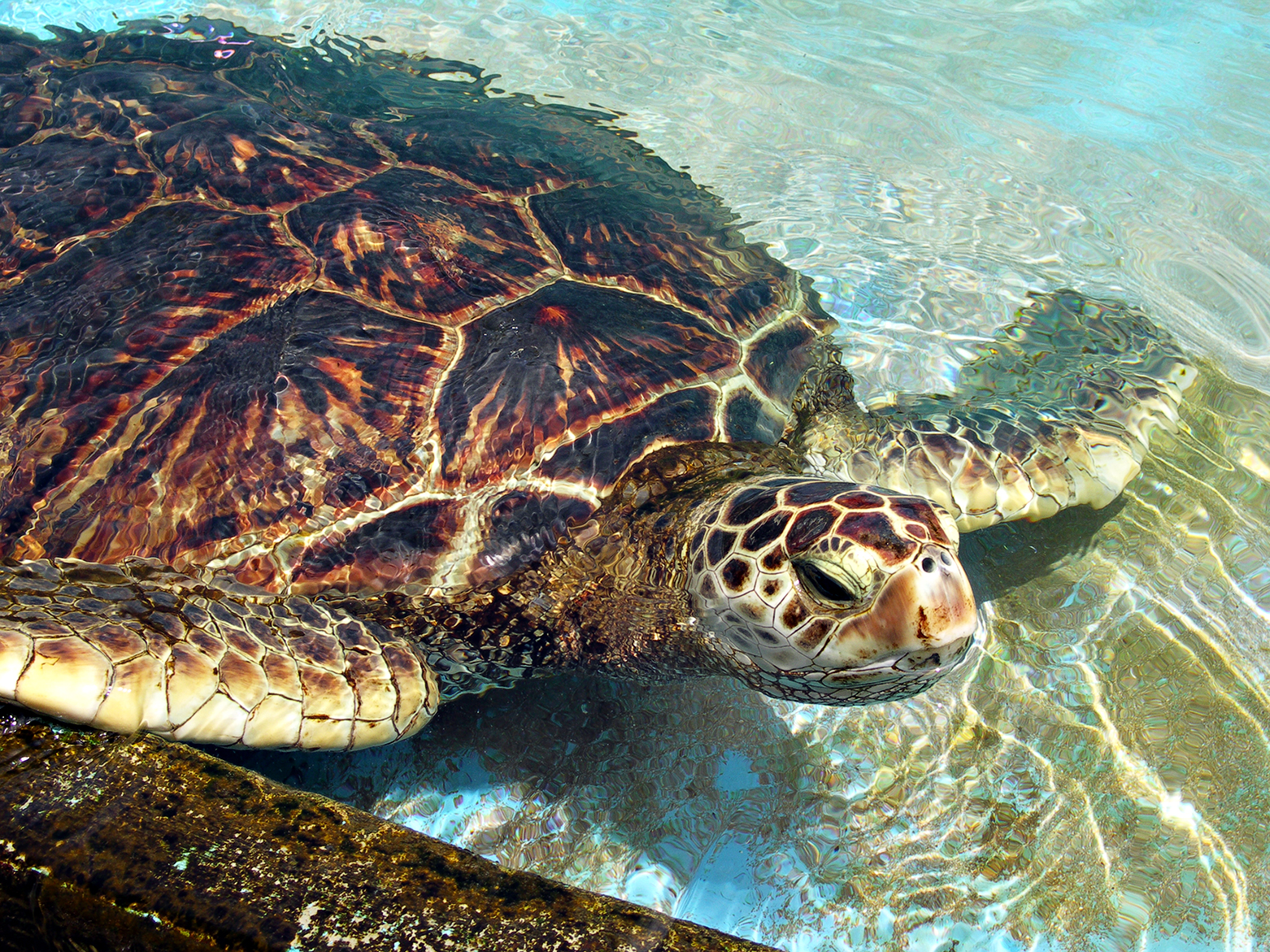
Green sea turtle, Chelonia mydas

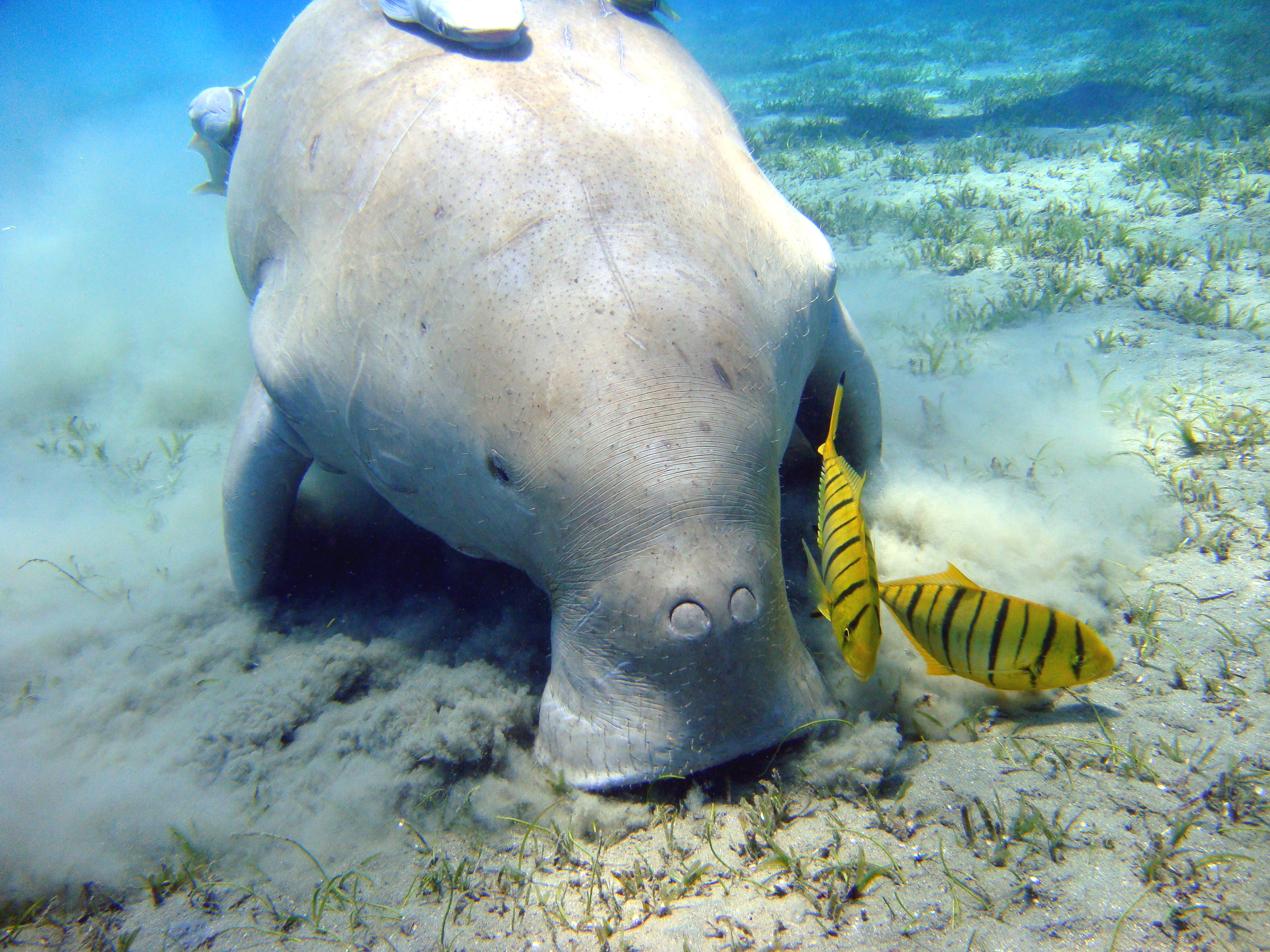
Dugong, Dugong dugon

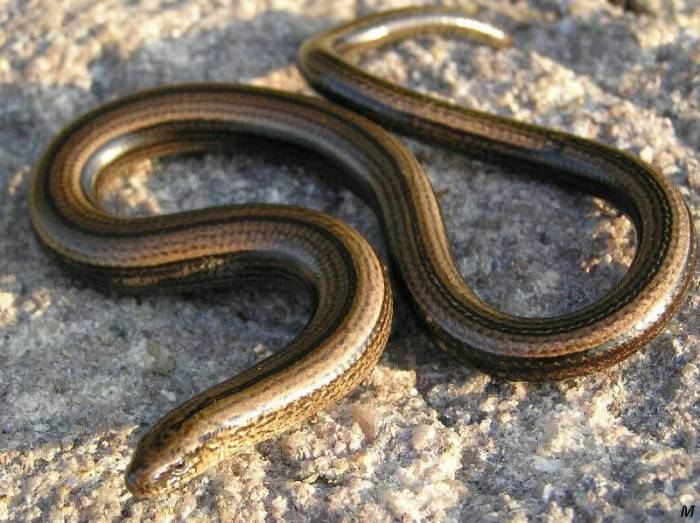
Slowworm, Anguis fragilis
