= Brown shrimp =

Several species share the common name "brown shrimp":

- Crangon crangon, a species found in the north-eastern Atlantic Ocean and North Sea
- Farfantepenaeus aztecus (formerly Penaeus aztecus), a species found in the north-western Atlantic Ocean and Gulf of Mexico
- Farfantepenaeus subtilis (formerly Penaeus subtilis), a species found in the south-western Atlantic Ocean as far north as Cuba
- Metapenaeus monoceros (formerly Penaeus monoceros), an Indo-Pacific species and Lessepsian migrant
