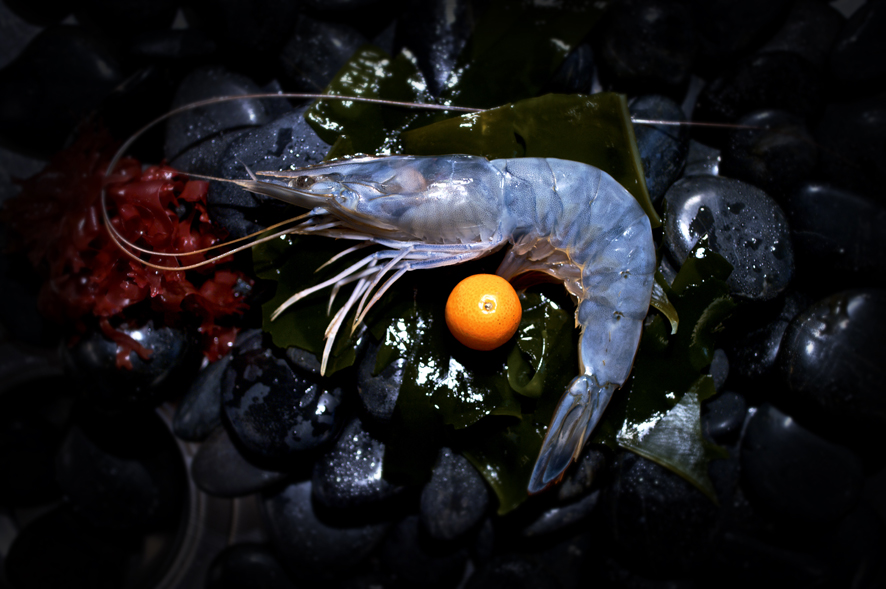
- Litopenaeus stylirostris

Scientific classification
- Kingdom: Animalia
- Phylum: Arthropoda
- Clade: Pancrustacea
- Class: Malacostraca
- Order: Decapoda
- Suborder: Dendrobranchiata
- Family: Penaeidae
- Genus: Litopenaeus; Pérez Farfante, 1969

= Litopenaeus =

Subgenus of crustaceans

Litopenaeus is a subgenus of prawns, for some time considered as a separate genus. Its members were split from Penaeus in 1997, and returned as a subgenus in 2023. It contains five species:

- Litopenaeus occidentalis (Streets, 1871)
- Litopenaeus schmitti (Burkenroad, 1936)
- Litopenaeus setiferus (Linnaeus, 1767)
- Litopenaeus stylirostris (Stimpson, 1871)
- Litopenaeus vannamei (Boone, 1931)

== Distribution ==
The western-Atlantic species P. (L.) setiferus and P. (L.) schmitii, both found in shallow waters, are similar in appearance, but can be distinguished by the structure of their genitals. They are allopatric: Penaeus setiferus in North America (including Gulf of Mexico), and Penaeus schmitii in the Caribbean, Central, and South America.

Penaeus (Litopenaeus) stylirostris and P. (L.) occidentalis are found in the eastern Pacific. P. (L.) vannamei is native to the eastern Pacific, is farmed globally, and has been introduced to American and Asian coasts.

== Taxonomy ==
Litopenaeus was first defined in 1969 by Isabel Pérez Farfante, as one of four subgenera of Penaeus, the other three being Penaeus (nominate subgenus), Fenneropenaeus, and Melicertus. The members of Penaeus (Litopenaeus) differ from the other species by having open thylecae (the female sexual receptacle). She stated that the name is "from the Greek litos, meaning plain", and the type species was designated as P. (L.) vannamei.

Catalogues such as Holthuis 1980 included the subgenus in their organization of species. In 1997, Pérez Farfante and Brian Frederick Kensley proposed raising the subgenera, including Litopenaeus, to genus level. The change was disputed, but is evidenced in treatments such as De Grave et al. 2009, which lists Litopenaeus as a genus having five species.

In 2023, based on molecular phylogenetic analyses, Chan proposed a re-unification of Peneaus sensu lato, having eleven subgenera. Under this schema, Melicertus is split into multiple groups; Litopenaeus, Feneropenaeus, and Farfantepenaeus remain recognised groups and are returned to subgenus rank.

== Parasites ==
Litopenaeus is a suspected host of Vibrio parahaemolyticus, a pathogen of humans.
