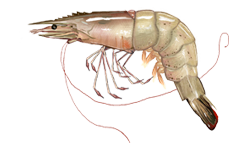

Scientific classification
- Kingdom: Animalia
- Phylum: Arthropoda
- Clade: Pancrustacea
- Class: Malacostraca
- Order: Decapoda
- Suborder: Dendrobranchiata
- Family: Penaeidae
- Genus: Litopenaeus
- Species: L. setiferus

Binomial name
- Litopenaeus setiferus (Linnaeus, 1767)

Synonyms
- Cancer setiferus Linnaeus, 1767; Penaeus setiferus (Linnaeus, 1767)

= Litopenaeus setiferus =

Species of crustacean

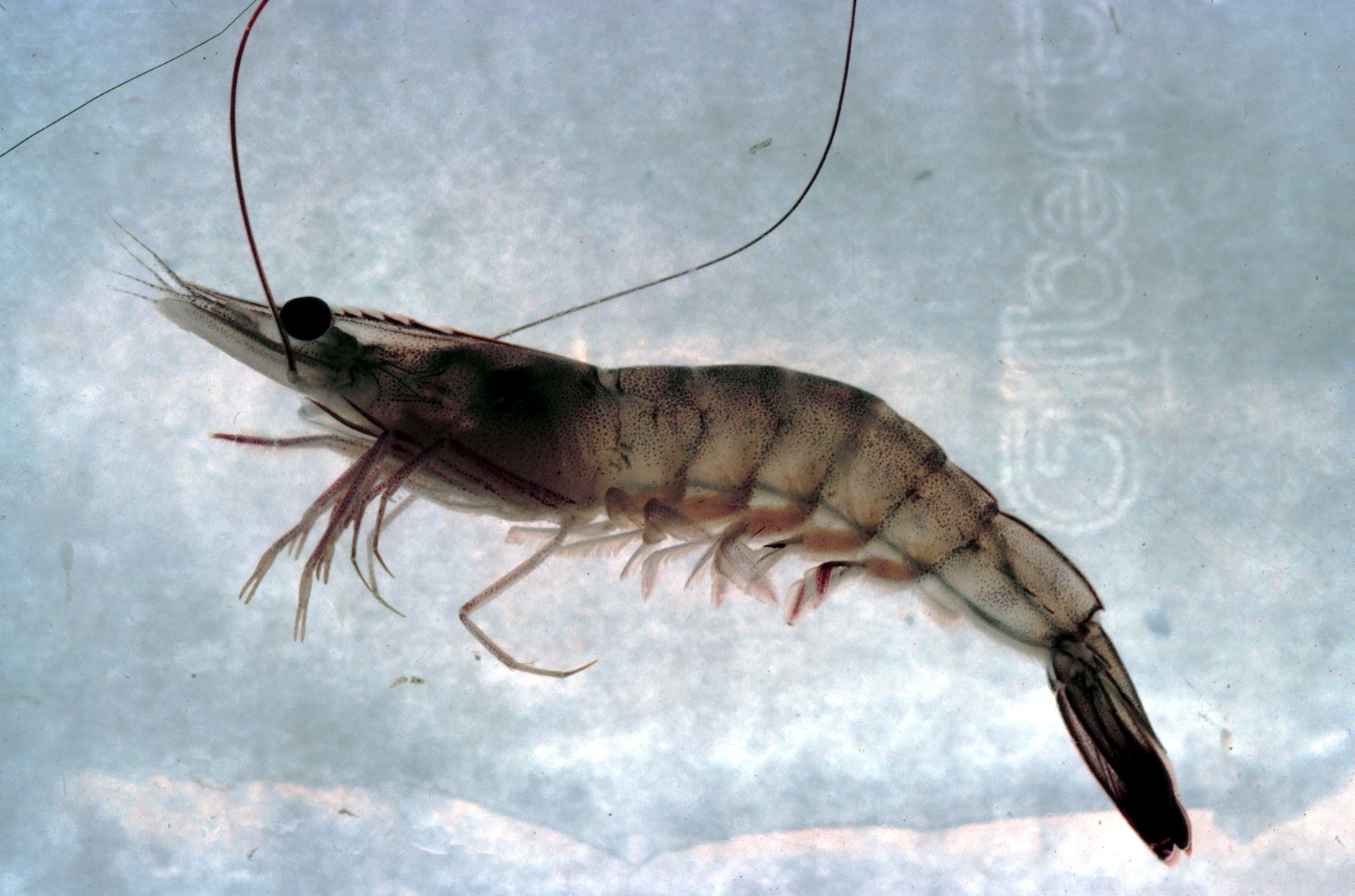

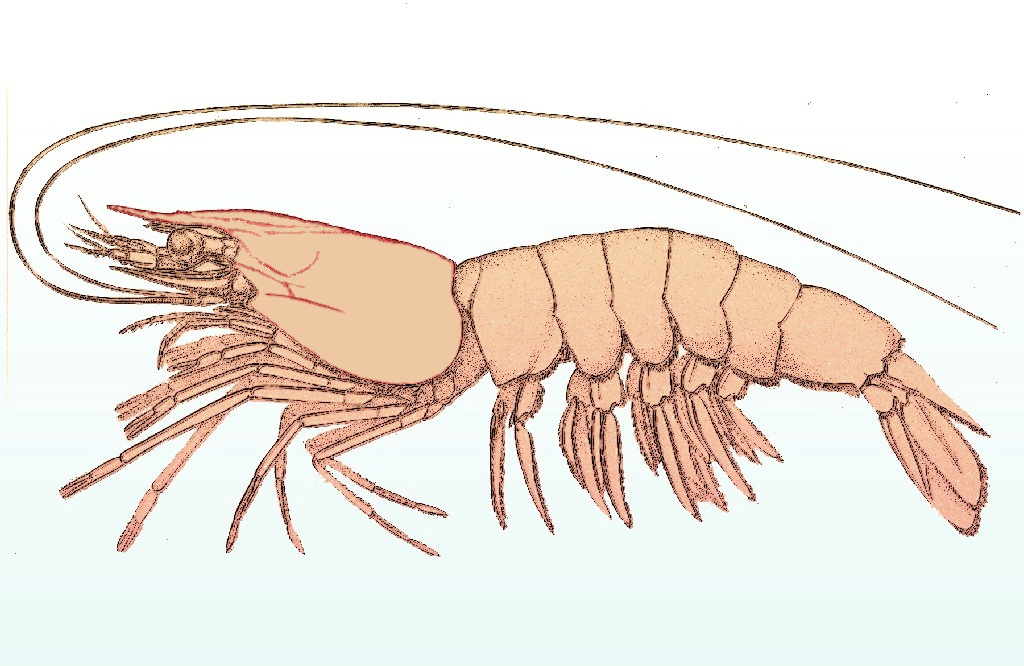
Diagram of Litopenaeus setiferus

Litopenaeus setiferus (also accepted: Penaeus setiferus, and known by various common names including Atlantic white shrimp, white shrimp, gray shrimp, lake shrimp, green shrimp, green-tailed shrimp, blue-tailed shrimp, rainbow shrimp, Daytona shrimp, Mayport Shrimp, common shrimp, southern shrimp, and, in Mexico, camaron blanco) is a species of prawn found along the Atlantic coast of North America and in the Gulf of Mexico. It was the subject of the earliest shrimp fishery in the United States.

== Distribution ==
The range of L. setiferus extends from Fire Island, New York to Ciudad Campeche, Mexico. It requires warm water, and is unable to survive below 3 °C (37 °F), with appreciable growth only occurring at temperatures over 20 °C (68 °F).

== Description ==
Litopenaeus setiferus may reach a total length (excluding antennae) of 197 millimetres (7.8 in), with females being larger than males. The antennae may be up to three times the length of the body, which is bluish white with a tinge of pink on the sides, and black spots. The pleopods are often redder, and the uropods and telson are green. The rostrum is long and thin, with 5–11 teeth on the upper edge and two on the lower edge, and continues along the carapace as a dorsal carina (ridge). Deep grooves alongside the carina separate the related species Farfantepenaeus aztecus ("brown shrimp") and Farfantepenaeus duorarum ("pink shrimp") from L. setiferus, which is sometimes called the non-grooved shrimp.

== Ecology ==
Litopenaeus setiferus lives in estuaries and from the littoral zone to water with a depth of 100 feet (30 m) in the Atlantic, or up to 260 feet (79 m) in the Gulf of Mexico. Litopenaeus setiferus is an omnivore; in Lake Pontchartrain, it feeds chiefly on the seagrass Vallisneria americana and detritus. Many aquatic animals feed on L. setiferus, including fish such as red drum (Sciaenops ocellatus) and turtles such as the loggerhead sea turtle (Caretta caretta).

== Life cycle ==
Spawning in L. setiferus occurs while the water is warm, between the increase in water temperatures in the spring and the sudden decline in temperature in the fall. It generally occurs within 9 km (5.6 mi) of the shoreline, in water less than 9 metres (30 ft) deep in the Atlantic, or 8–31 metres (26–102 ft) deep in the Gulf of Mexico. Males attach a spermatophore to the females, which is then used to fertilize the eggs as they are released. Each female releases 500,000–1,000,000 purplish eggs, each 0.2–0.3 mm (0.008–0.012 in) across, which sink to the bottom of the water column.

After 10–12 hours, the eggs hatch into nauplius larvae, which are 0.3 mm (0.012 in) long, planktonic and unable to feed. They molt five times to reach the protozoea stage, 1 mm (0.039 in) long. These grow to 2.5 mm (0.098 in) long over two molts, before passing through three molts as a mysis larva. About 15–20 days after hatching, the animals reach the postlarva stage; in the second postlarval stage, at a length of 7 mm (0.28 in), they begin to enter estuaries and drop down to the substrate.

Spring rains flush the shrimp out into the ocean. In the Eastern United States, shrimp then migrate south towards warmer waters.

== Fishery ==
Subsistence fishing for prawns was carried out by Native Americans along the Atlantic coast. This knowledge was passed on to European settlers, and Litopenaeus setiferus became the subject of the earliest shrimp fishery in the United States, with commercial fishery for L. setiferus starting as early as 1709.

The harvesting for L. setiferus began in the 1950s and since that time is collected monthly throughout Gulf of Mexico.

== Other references ==
- White shrimp NOAA FishWatch. Retrieved 4 November 2012.
