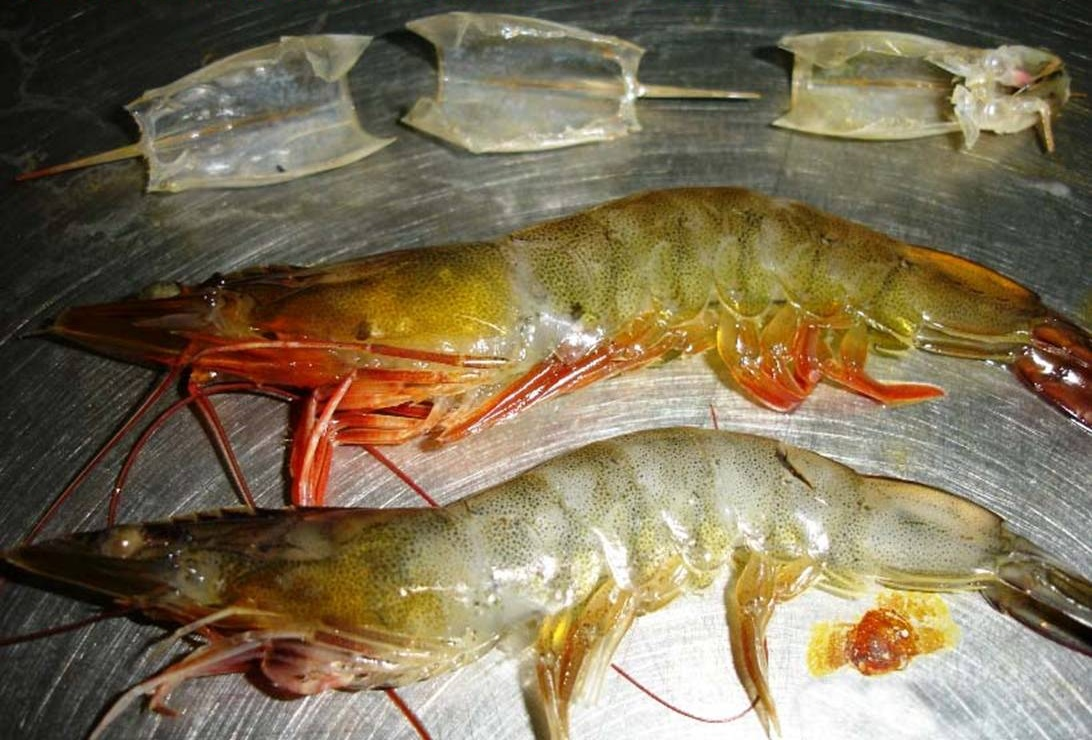

Scientific classification
- Kingdom: Animalia
- Phylum: Arthropoda
- Clade: Pancrustacea
- Class: Malacostraca
- Order: Decapoda
- Suborder: Dendrobranchiata
- Family: Penaeidae
- Genus: Penaeus
- Subgenus: Penaeus (Litopenaeus)
- Species: P. vannamei

Binomial name
- Penaeus vannamei (Boone, 1931)

Synonyms
- Peneus vannamei Boone, 1931; Penaeus (Litopenaeus) vannamei Pérez Farfante, 1969; Litopenaeus vannamei Pérez Farfante and Kensley, 1997

= Whiteleg shrimp =

Species of crustacean

Global aquaculture production of Whiteleg shrimp (Penaeus vannamei) in million tonnes from 1980 to 2022, as reported by the FAO

Whiteleg shrimp (Penaeus (Litopenaeus) vannamei, synonyms Litopenaeus vannamei, Penaeus vannamei), also known as Pacific white shrimp or King prawn or White shrimp, is a species of prawn of the eastern Pacific Ocean commonly caught or farmed for food.

== Description ==
Litopenaeus vannamei grows to a maximum length of 230 mm (9.1 in), with a carapace length of 90 mm (3.5 in). Adults live in the ocean, at depths to 72 m (236 ft), while juveniles live in estuaries. The rostrum is moderately long, with 7–10 teeth on the dorsal side and two to four teeth on the ventral side. The global production of white shrimp had increased to approximately 5 million metric tons, with a market value reaching USD 30 billion in 2018.

== Distribution and habitat ==
Whiteleg shrimp are native to the eastern Pacific Ocean, from the Mexican state of Sonora to as far south as northern Peru. It is a euryhaline tropical shrimp species capable of growing in salinities ranging from 0 to 40‰, with the optimal salinity for growth being between 15 and 25‰. The optimal pH for white shrimp is approximately 7.56, and dissolved oxygen levels should be maintained above 2.8 mg/L. Whiteleg shrimp can grow in water temperatures ranging from 15 °C to 38 °C, with the optimal growth temperature between 22 °C and 35 °C; it is restricted to areas where the water temperatures remain above 20 °C (68 °F) throughout the year.

== Taxonomy and systematics ==
Peneus vannamei was described by Lee Boone in 1931 (using an alternate spelling of Penæus). She named it for Willard G. Van Name, who collected the type specimen from the market in Panama City.

Isabel Pérez Farfante defined Litopenaeus in 1969, as one of four subgenera of Penaeus, the other three being Penaeus (nominate subgenus), Fenneropenaeus, and Melicertus. She designated Penaeus (Litopenaeus) vannamei as the type species.

In 1997, Pérez Farfante and Brian Frederick Kensley proposed raising the subgenera, including Litopenaeus, to genus level. Authors accepting that change represent the species as Litopenaeus vannamei.

In 2023, based on molecular phylogenetic analyses, Chan proposed a re-unification of Peneaus sensu lato, having eleven subgenera. Under this schema, the white-legged shrimp changes from Litopenaeus vannamei back to Penaeus (Litopenaeus) vannamei.

== Fishery and aquaculture ==
During the 20th century, L.vannamei was an important species for Mexican inshore fishermen, as well as for trawlers further offshore. In the late 20th century, the wild fishery was overtaken by the development of aquaculture production; this began in 1973 in Florida using prawns captured in Panama, that were used in hatcheries for larvae production.

In Latin America, the cultivation of L. vannamei expanded with improvements such as the availability of hatchery-produced larvae, advances in feed formulation, modernization of farming techniques, development of freezing facilities, and establishment of market distribution channels. From Mexico to Peru, most countries developed large production areas in the 70s and 80s. Ecuador has become one of the world’s leading producers of whiteleg shrimp.

Around the beginning of the 21st century, Asia introduced this species in their aquaculture operations (changing from Penaeus monodon). China, Vietnam, India and others have become major packers as well. The packing of shrimp from aquaculture origin has surpassed the quantity of ocean caught wild shrimp in recent years. Both wild-caught and farmed shrimp are affected by environmental conditions and disease outbreaks.

By 2004, the production of white shrimp had reached 1,116,000 metric tons, surpassing that of black tiger shrimp. According to statistics from the Food and Agriculture Organization (FAO), shrimp farming accounted for 18% of the total global aquaculture trade volume in 2018. In 2017, the global shrimp production was approximately 5,511,914 metric tons, with white shrimp accounting for 80% of the total production.

Litopenaeus vannamei have been cultivated indoors through a recirculating aquaculture system in Downey, California.

== Weather effect ==
Normally, there are peaks of production during the warm El Niño years, and reduced production during the cooler La Niña years. The effect is on ocean caught as well as on aquaculture origin.

== Diseases ==
Litopenaeus vannamei farming has been affected by several pathogens, which have caused significant economic losses in the shrimp aquaculture industry. There are several known diseases. Production of L.vannamei is limited by its susceptibility to white spot syndrome, Taura syndrome, infectious hypodermal and haematopoietic necrosis, baculoviral midgut gland necrosis, and Vibrio infections. Acute hepatopancreatic necrosis syndrome (AHPND), caused by Vibrio parahaemolyticus, was initially referred to as Early Mortality Syndrome (EMS). It has caused significant economic losses in the white shrimp aquaculture industry. Vibrio harveyi and Vibrio alginolyticus are also among the commonly found Vibrio species.

In aquaculture, the use of antibiotics or chemical agents has been associated with environmental pollution and drug residue concerns. As a result, practices have increasingly shifted toward improving pond conditions and enhancing the immune response of white shrimp. Approaches such as water quality management, incorporation of probiotics into feed, and application of immunostimulants have been reported to be effective in reducing the risk of large-scale disease outbreaks. Probiotics have been widely applied in feed and aquaculture environments to improve water quality and enhance the immunity of cultured organisms, thereby reducing disease incidence and helping prevent outbreaks.

== Impact on nature ==
In 2010, Greenpeace International added the whiteleg shrimp to its seafood red list. This lists seafoods that commonly are sold in supermarkets around the world, and which have a very high risk of being sourced from unsustainable fisheries. The reasons given by Greenpeace were "destruction of vast areas of mangroves in several countries, overfishing of juvenile shrimp from the wild to supply shrimp farms, and significant human rights abuses". In 2016, L.vannamei accounted for 53% of the total production of farmed crustaceans globally.

== Immune mechanism ==
Crustaceans primarily rely on non-specific immune responses, which can be further categorized into cellular immune responses and humoral immune responses.

- Cellular immune responses: cellular components include all reactions mediated directly by haemocytes, such as phagocytosis, encapsulation, and nodule formation. Crustacean haemocytes are commonly classified into three distinct types: hyaline cells, semigranular cells (SGCs), and granular cells (GCs). Hyaline cells, the smallest of the three haemocyte types, are agranular and function as the primary active phagocytes. SGCs contain numerous small eosinophilic granules and play a key role in microorganism recognition, being involved in encapsulation, coagulation, and occasional phagocytosis. Granules of granular cells (GCs) contain prophenoloxidase (proPO), which is stored in an inactive form, as well as antimicrobial peptides (AMPs), protease inhibitors, and a cell adhesion/degranulating factor called peroxinectin.
- Humoral immune responses: humoral components primarily consist of the prophenoloxidase-activating system, agglutinins, protease inhibitors, antimicrobial peptides (AMPs), phosphatases, lysozymes, clotting proteins, and reactive oxygen or nitrogen intermediates. It also includes substances present in the hemolymph that recognize foreign agents and initiate immune responses, such as lipopolysaccharide- and β-1,3-glucan-binding protein (LGBP), lectins, clotting agents, and Toll-like receptors. Upon hemocyte lysis, lectins are released, which contribute to pathogen recognition and assist in phagocytosis and agglutination.

== See also ==
- Macrobrachium rosenbergii, the giant freshwater prawns
- Pandalus borealis, Canadian northern prawns
