= Western king prawn =

Scientific classification
- Kingdom: Animalia
- Phylum: Arthropoda
- Clade: Pancrustacea
- Class: Malacostraca
- Order: Decapoda
- Suborder: Dendrobranchiata
- Family: Penaeidae
- Genus: Penaeus
- Species: P. latisulcatus

Binomial name
- Penaeus latisulcatus Kishinouye, 1896

Synonyms
- Penaeus latisulcatus Kishinouye, 1896; Penaeus (Oleopenaeus) latisulcatus (Kishinouye, 1896) sec. Chan, 2023

Species of crustacean

The western king prawn is an edible dendrobranch prawn endemic to western and southern Australia. Its scientific name is Penaeus latisulcatus; it has been classified in the genus Melicertus, and is currently treated in the subgenus Oleopenaeus along with P. (O.) hathor and the eastern king prawn P. (O.) plebejus. It is caught by commercial fishers for human food.

== Habitat and behaviour ==
Western king prawns are bottom-dwellers that prefer sandy substrate and high salinity. Juveniles develop on sandy and muddy intertidal areas within mud-flat and mangrove habitats.

Western king prawns burrow during the day and are active at night, with higher activity during dark moon phases.

== Fisheries ==
In South Australia, the western king prawn is caught commercially from three single-species fisheries: Spencer Gulf, Gulf Saint Vincent, and West Coast (SA). It comprises 40 to 60 percent of the Western Australia catches from Shark Bay, Broome, and Exmouth Gulf fisheries, along with coral (Metapenaeopsis sp.), brown tiger, endeavour (Metapenaeus endeavouri or M. ensis) and banana (P. indicus or P. merguiensis) prawns.

The species' FAO code is "WKP". The official common name under Australian Standard 5300 is "Western King Prawn", and its CAAB Code (Codes for Australian Aquatic Biota) is "28 711047", where the prefix "28 711" denotes penaeid prawns. (Note: CAAB also provides for group codes. 28711908 is used for the related eastern and western king prawns, whilst 28711910 covers the vernacular use of "king prawn" to include the red spot king prawn (P. longistylus).)
