= Lakah =

Lakah may refer to:

- Raymond Lakah (born c. 1960 as Rami Lakah), French-Egyptian business owner
- Lakah, Iran, or Qavamabad-e Chichaklu, a village
