= White shrimp =

White shrimp may refer to

- "Atlantic white shrimp" – Litopenaeus setiferus
- "Pacific white shrimp" (Litopenaeus vannamei) - whiteleg shrimp
- "Indian white shrimp" (Penaeus indicus) - Indian prawn
- "Chinese white shrimp" (Penaeus chinensis)
- Parapenaeus longirostris, "gamba blanca" in Spanish
