= Fenneropenaeus =

Scientific classification
- Kingdom: Animalia
- Phylum: Arthropoda
- Clade: Pancrustacea
- Class: Malacostraca
- Order: Decapoda
- Suborder: Dendrobranchiata
- Family: Penaeidae
- Genus: Penaeus
- Subgenus: Fenneropenaeus; Pérez Farfante, 1969

Subgenus of crustaceans

Fenneropenaeus is a subgenus of Penaeus dendrobranch prawns, for some time considered as a separate genus. It was elevated to a genus in 1997, and returned as a subgenus in 2023. It contains six species:

- P. (Fe.) chinensis - Chinese white prawn
- P. (Fe.) orientalis
- P. (Fe.) indicus - Indian white prawn
- P. (Fe.) merguiensis - banana prawn
- P. (Fe.) penicillatus - redtail prawn
- P. (Fe.) silasi

== Taxonomy ==
Fenneropenaeus was first defined in 1969 by Isabel Pérez Farfante, as one of four subgenera of Penaeus, the other three being Litopenaeus, Penaeus, and Melicertus. She stated that the name honours Fenner A. Chase Jr., "whose advice through the years has been very helpful to me in my studies". The type species was designated as Penaeus indicus H. Milne Edwards, 1837. The original circumscription included four Indo-Pacific species: indicus, merguiensis, penicillatus, and orientalis.
