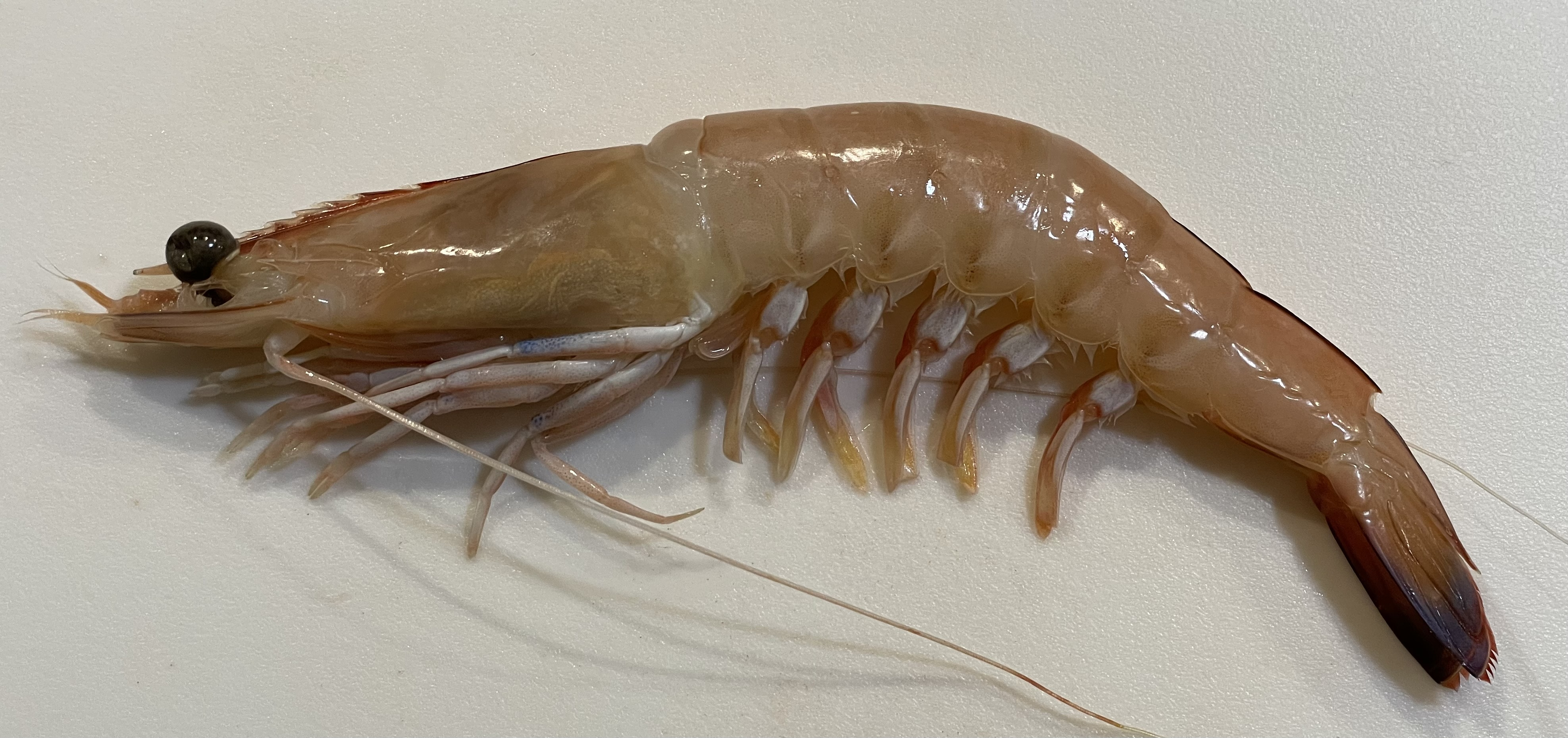

Scientific classification
- Kingdom: Animalia
- Phylum: Arthropoda
- Clade: Pancrustacea
- Class: Malacostraca
- Order: Decapoda
- Suborder: Dendrobranchiata
- Family: Penaeidae
- Genus: Melicertus
- Species: M. plebejus

Binomial name
- Melicertus plebejus (Hess, 1865)

Synonyms
- Penaeus plebejus Hess, 1865; Penaeus canaliculatus australiensis Bate, 1888; Penaeus maccullochi Schmitt, 1926; Penaeus (Melicertus) plebejus (Hess, 1865) sec. Burkenroad, 1934; Melicertus plebejus (Hess, 1865) sec. Pérez Farfante & Kensley, 1997; Penaeus (Oleopenaeus) plebejus (Hess, 1865) sec. Chan, 2023

= Eastern king prawn =

Species of crustacean

The eastern king prawn is an edible dendrobranch prawn endemic to eastern Australia. Its scientific name is Penaeus plebejus, Melicertus plebejus, or most recently Penaeus (Oleopenaeus) plebejus. It is caught by commercial and recreational fishers for human food.

== Names ==
Eastern king prawns are marketed in eastern Australia as "king prawns" without qualification. In southeast Queensland, they may also be called Mooloolabah prawns.

The United Nations Food and Agriculture Organization (FAO) uses French and Spanish names that are direct translations of "eastern royal prawn": Crevette royale orientale, Camarón real oriental. The FAO English name is "Eastern king prawn".

== Taxonomy and systematics ==
The species was first formally described by Wilhelm Hess in 1865, named Penaeus plebejus (type locality Sydney). It was also described as Penaeus canaliculatus var. australiensis by Charles Spence Bate (1888). Waldo L. Schmitt (1926) described a separate species Penaeus maccullochi that was said to differ from P. plebejus in the nature of its carapace grooves; they were subsequently considered to be the same species.

In 1934, Martin Burkenroad separated the grooved-carapace species (including P. plebejus) into a separate sub-genus Penaeus (Melicertus). (Note: The name Melicertus is from Melicertus tigrinus Rafinesque, 1814 syn. Cancer kerathurus Forskål, 1775.) Subsequent authors from 1949 to 1972 split off additional subgenera. In 1997, Pérez Farfante & Kensley promoted the six subgenera to genus level, an approach that was subsequently followed by some authors but not others.

Based on molecular sequences of ribosomal and nuclear genes, Ma, Chan, and Chu (2011) found that Melicertus with Marsupenaeus formed a clade separate from the other (sub)genera of Penaeus sensu lato. However, due to the lack of morphological features that distinguish the clades (synapomorphies), they argued against creating two or three (Note: Melicertus clade incl. Marsupenaeus; Penaeus clade = Penaeus s.s (sec. Pérez Farfante & Kensley 1997) + Fenneropenaeus; Litopenaeus clade incl. Farfantepenaeus.) genera, and proposed restoring all the species into a single large Penaeus genus. Genetically, M. plebejus is most closely related to the western king prawns, M. latisculatus and M. (lat.) hathor.

As at 2022, the name Penaeus plebejus was treated as "accepted" by checklists such as the World Register of Marine Species. However, Melicertus plebejus is common in recent scientific literature, so when seeking information it is necessary to search for both names.

In 2023, considering additional molecular phylogenetic analysis by Yang et al., Chan proposed a reclassification of Penaeus into eleven subgenera. In this system, the new subgenus Oleopenaeus contains P. (O.) hathor, P. (O.) latisulcatus, and P. (O.) plebejus.

== Description ==
A medium to large prawn, specimens are commonly 10–21 cm total length and 40–50 g; they may grow up to 30 cm.

They have a single tooth on the ventral edge of the rostrum, and 10–11 on the dorsal edge.

Uncooked, they are light coral pink, with fine dark reddish-brown lines along the crests of the rostrum, carapace, and 5th to 7th tail segments. The distal part of the tail fan is pigmented blue to purple, and there can be slight blue pigmentation on the upper part of the walking legs above the "knees". The outer face of the swimming legs is whitish-pink, sometimes with a bluish tinge. Eyes are patterned black and dark tan.

The eastern king prawn is similar in form and colour to the western king prawn. The latter has more blue colour on the upper legs. They can be difficult to tell apart, and are usually distinguished based on location.

== Distribution and habitat ==
Juveniles inhabit estuaries, especially seagrass beds. Adults are found in coastal and estuarine waters, at depths up to 220 m.

They are found along the temperate to subtropical east coast of Australia from Bass Strait and north-east Tasmania in the south to Rockhampton in the north. (Note: Sources variously state the southernmost extent as Lakes Entrance (Victoria), Georges Bay, St Helens (Tasmania), or generally as Bass Strait.)

Hexham Swamp on the Hunter River is considered by fishermen to have previously been a major nursery for eastern king prawns. After construction of floodgates in the 1970s, prawn stocks declined noticeably as the swamp dried out.

== Fisheries ==
Eastern king prawns are wild-caught, particularly off the coasts of New South Wales and Queensland. They are harvested "by the dark of the moon" from mid-summer to winter using demersal otter trawling.

From 2011 to 2019, the annual catch of eastern king prawns varied between 2.7 and 3.5 kt. The maximum sustainable yield has been estimated a 2.4 kt.

The export code for "Prawn – Eastern King" is PWJ, and the FAO code is PNP. CAAB code for the species, used in catch reporting and fisheries management, is 28 711052. (Note: Code 28 711910 is for unspecified Australian species of king prawn. Melicertus spp. is 28 711925, and family Penaeidae is 28 711.)
