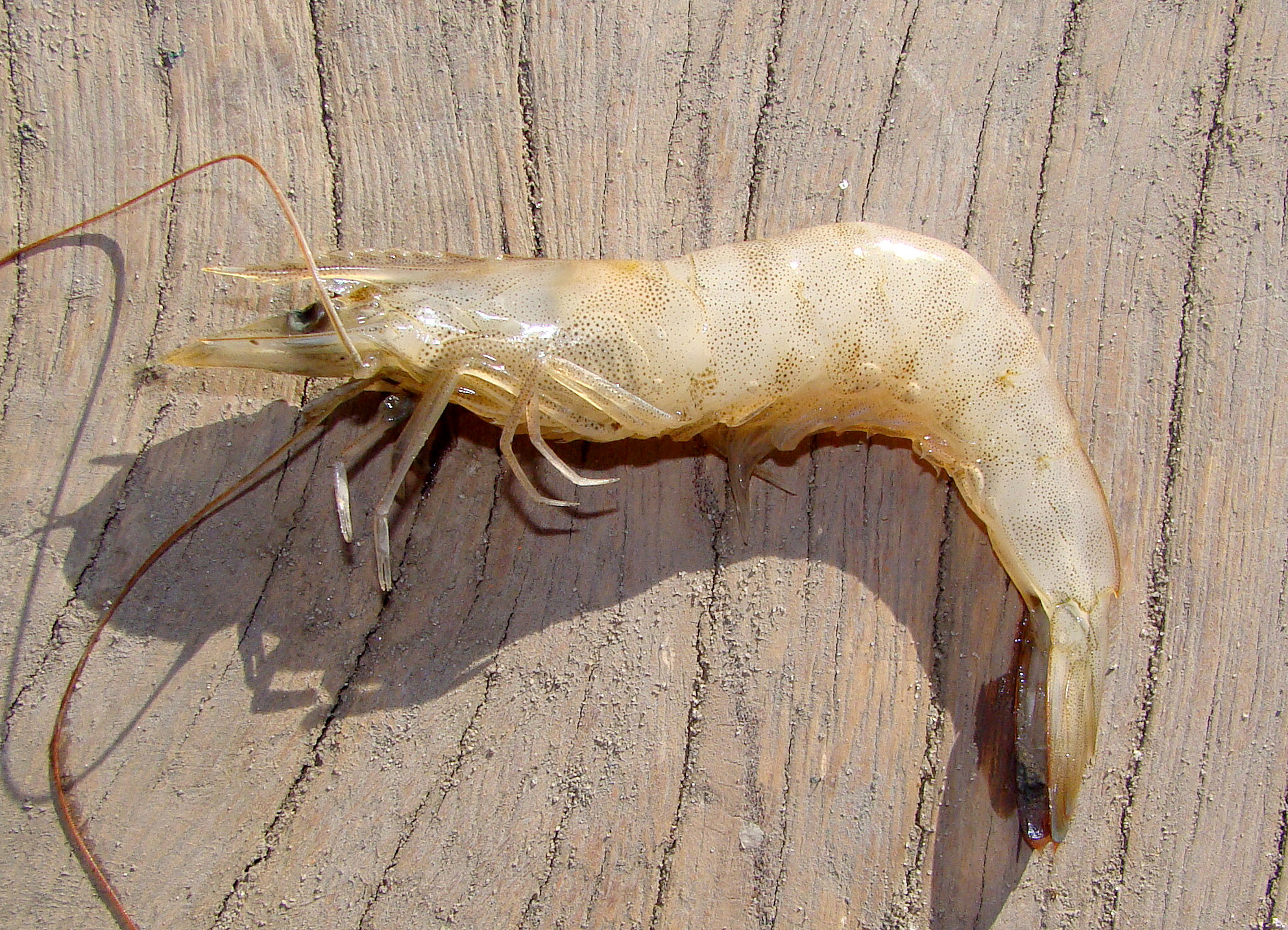
- Farfantepenaeus paulensis

Scientific classification
- Kingdom: Animalia
- Phylum: Arthropoda
- Clade: Pancrustacea
- Class: Malacostraca
- Order: Decapoda
- Suborder: Dendrobranchiata
- Family: Penaeidae
- Genus: Farfantepenaeus; Burukovsky, 1997

Type species
- Penaeus brasiliensis Latreille, 1817

= Farfantepenaeus =

Subenus of decapod crustaceans

Farfantepenaeus is a subgenus of prawns in the family Penaeidae, sometimes treated as a genus. Its eight species were formerly included in the genus Penaeus. It was first published as a subgenus name in 1972 by Rudolf N. Burukovsky, but without the necessary designation of a type species. That situation was corrected by the same author in 1997. The name Farfantepenaeus commemorates the Cuban carcinologist Isabel Pérez Farfante.

== Species ==
- Farfantepenaeus aztecus – northern brown shrimp
- Farfantepenaeus brasiliensis – red-spotted shrimp, spotted pink shrimp
- Farfantepenaeus brevirostris – crystal shrimp, pink shrimp
- Farfantepenaeus californiensis – yellowleg shrimp, brown shrimp
- Farfantepenaeus duorarum – northern pink shrimp
- Farfantepenaeus notialis – southern pink shrimp
- Farfantepenaeus paulensis – São Paulo shrimp, Carpas shrimp
- Farfantepenaeus subtilis – southern brown shrimp
