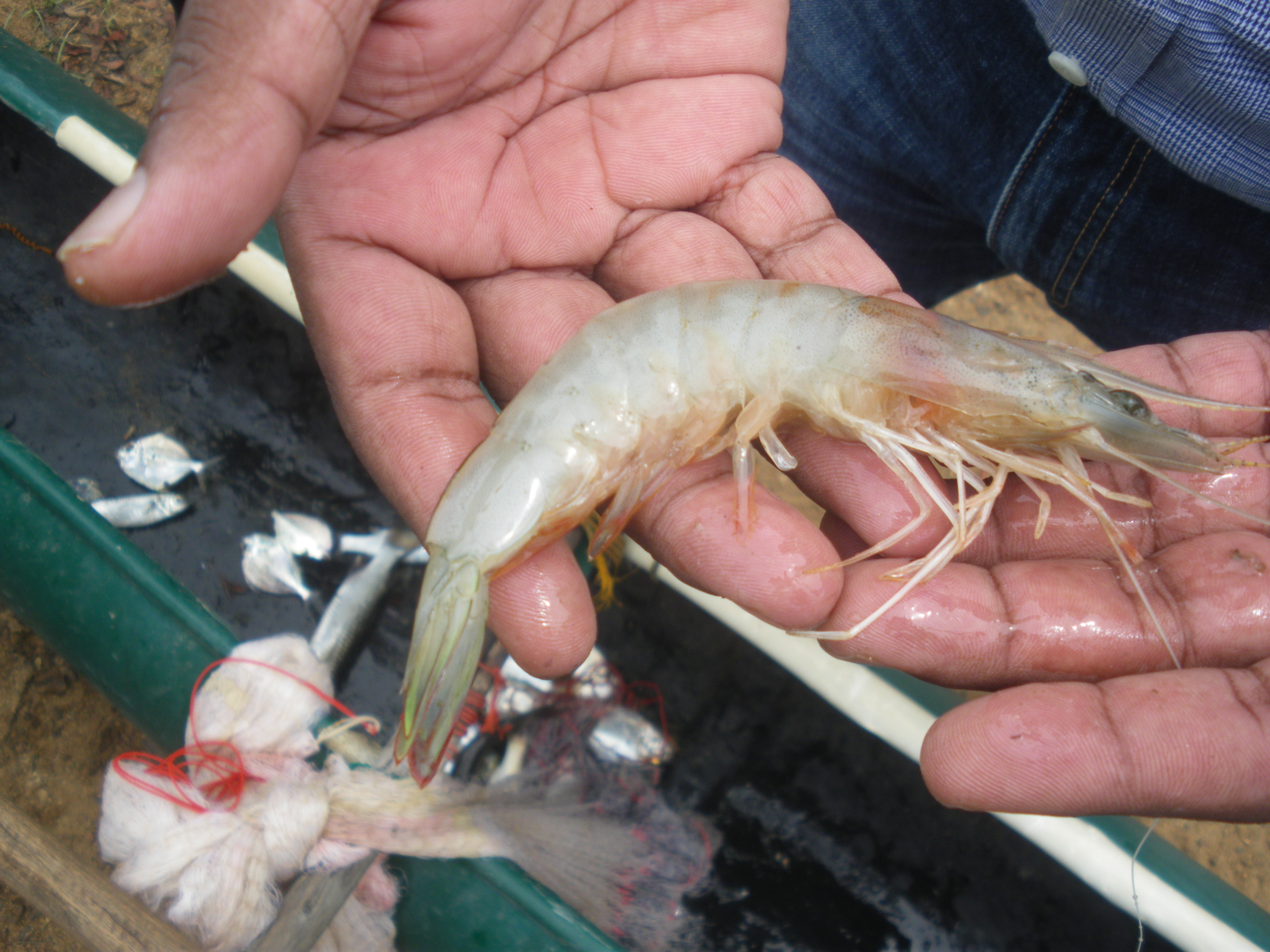

Scientific classification
- Kingdom: Animalia
- Phylum: Arthropoda
- Clade: Pancrustacea
- Class: Malacostraca
- Order: Decapoda
- Suborder: Dendrobranchiata
- Family: Penaeidae
- Genus: Fenneropenaeus
- Species: F. indicus

Binomial name
- Fenneropenaeus indicus (H. Milne-Edwards, 1837)

Synonyms
- Penaeus indicus H. Milne-Edwards, 1837; Palaemon longicornis Olivier, 1825

= Indian prawn =

Species of crustacean

The Indian prawn (Fenneropenaeus indicus, formerly Penaeus indicus) is one of the major commercial prawn species of the world. It is found in the Indo-West Pacific from eastern and south-eastern Africa, through India, Malaysia and Indonesia to southern China and northern Australia. Adult shrimp grow to a length of about 22 cm (9 in) and live on the seabed to depths of about 90 m (300 ft). The early developmental stages take place in the sea before the larvae move into estuaries. They return to the sea as sub-adults.

The Indian prawn is used for human consumption and is the subject of a sea fishery, particularly in China, India, Indonesia, Vietnam and Thailand. It is also the subject of an aquaculture industry, the main countries involved in this being Saudi Arabia, Vietnam, Iran and India. For this, wild seed is collected or young shrimps are reared in hatcheries and kept in ponds as they grow. The ponds may be either extensive with reliance on natural foods, with rice paddy fields being used in India after the monsoon period, or semi-intensive or intensive, with controlled feeding. Harvesting is by drainage of the pond.

== Common names ==
F. indicus is known by many common names around the world, including Indian white prawn, Tugela prawn, white prawn, banana prawn, Indian banana prawn and red leg banana prawn, some of which may also apply to the related species F. merguiensis. The name white shrimp may also refer to other species.

== Ecology and life cycle ==
F. indicus is a marine decapod with estuarine juveniles. It prefers mud or sandy mud at depths of 2–90 metres (7–295 ft). It grows to 228 millimetres (9 in) and has a life span of 18 months. After hatching, free-swimming nauplii are obtained, which further passes through protozoea, mysis and then to postlarval stage, which resembles the adult prawn. The postlarvae migrate to the estuaries, feed and grow until they attain a length of 110–120 mm, and these sub adults return to the sea and get recruited into fishery. It is also commonly used in shrimp farming.

== Fisheries and aquaculture ==
The world's production of shrimp is about 6 million tonnes, of which approximately 3.4 million tonnes is contributed by capture fisheries and 2.4 million tonnes by aquaculture. China and four other Asian countries, including India, Indonesia, Vietnam and Thailand, together account for 55% of the capture fisheries. Among the shrimp, the contribution of F. indicus to global fisheries was around 2.4%, and to global farmed shrimp production was 1.2% in 2005. Currently F. indicus is mainly cultured in Saudi Arabia, Vietnam, Islamic Republic of Iran and India. Saudi Arabia was the largest producer in 2005 at nearly 11,300 tonnes with Vietnam not far behind with 10,000 tonnes. In India F. indicus farming declined from 5200 tonnes in 2000 to 1100 tonnes in 2005 due to preference of farmers for P. monodon.

=== Fishery ===
In 2010, Greenpeace International added the Indian prawn to its seafood red list. Although the Indian prawn itself is not threatened, the methods used to capture it result in a large amount of bycatch, which includes endangered species such as sea turtles.

=== Aquaculture ===
Production cycle of F. indicus follows the same steps as for other species of shrimp, i.e., seed production and Grow-out of the post larvae to marketable size. The sources of seeds and grow-out techniques can be differed as desired by the farmer to achieve a balance between the cost of production and the desired quantity of output.

==== Supply of seeds ====
Seeds can be obtained from the wild or by establishment of hatcheries. In traditional paddy field systems the juveniles which have congregated near the sluice gates are allowed to enter the field with the incoming high tide. Among the prawn species entering the field F. indicus constitute around 36%–43%. Earlier wild seeds were also collected and sold to shrimp farmers. Nowadays the dependence on wild seed has been reduced due to establishment of hatcheries and also due to reduction in wild seeds due to overfishing.

==== Broodstock ====
Intensification of cultured shrimp is limited by seed supply. The production of seeds in hatcheries depends on the availability of broodstock and quality of spawners. Spawners for seed production can be obtained from the wild or can be developed by induced maturation in hatcheries.

Matured individuals can be collected from the wild during their peak spawning seasons in March/April and July/August in the tropics. A temperature range of 27–31 °C (81–88 °F) and salinity of 30‰–35‰ is ideal for spawning.

Although hatcheries in the developing countries still depend on wild seed, maturation can be induced by eyestalk ablation technique where eyestalks of females are unilaterally ablated to stimulate endocrine activity. The ablated females spawn after 4 days, with a peak observed at days 5–6. However it is expensive to raise spawners in captivity and ablated shrimps result in less hardy fry with low survival rate. Even though the fecundity of the ablated females may not differ significantly, the hatch rates of ablated females was found to be markedly less (37.8% to 58.1%) than that of unablated females (69.2%). It is also found that wild females are more fecund per unit weight than ablated females. However quantitatively the number of spawns, eggs and nauplii produced by ablated females is ten, eight and six times respectively that of unablated females.

The size of females used for broodstock and spawning should preferably be above be 150 millimetres (5.9 in) and males above 140 mm (5.5 in), as they mature at approximately 148 mm (5.8 in) and 128 mm (5.0 in) respectively.

==== Hatchery ====
Circular tanks of 2–5 tonnes capacity are used to rear larvae from nauplius to mysis stage. The salinity of water is maintained at around 32‰ and pH at 8.2. Feed is not provided to nauplius as it is a non-feeding stage. The protozoea stage is supplied with a mixed culture of diatoms dominated by Chaetoceros spp. or Skeletonema spp. at a concentration on around 30,000 to 40,000 cells per ml. The best algal density promoting highest survival, growth and fastest larval development is around 60–70 cells per μL. From the mysis stage they are also fed with artemia nauplii and egg-prawn-custard mix. Post larval rearing can be continued in the same tank and post-larvae (PL) are fed with minced mussel meat, mantis shrimp powder or variety of other fresh feeds of particle size 200–1000 μm till they reach PL-20 (day 20 of post-larva). After PL-20 stage they can be stocked directly into grow-out ponds without acclimatization.

==== Grow-out techniques ====
Grow-out techniques can be extensive, semi-intensive or intensive.

===== Extensive =====
This is the traditional system of shrimp farming which involves stocking of the wild seed with incoming tidal water is practiced in Bangladesh, India, Indonesia, Myanmar, Philippines, and Vietnam. On the southwest coast of India, low-lying coastal paddy fields are used for growing salinity tolerant variety of paddy called ‘pokkali’ and shrimp farming is carried out post monsoon during November to April. It takes an average of 150–180 days for a single crop to be ready to harvest. The estimated production of prawn-cum-paddy culture varies from 400 to 1200 kg/ha for six months period. F. indicus forms about 36%–43% of the total yield of shrimp which can go up to 400–900 kg/ha/yr. Extensive culture can be made more productive by construction of artificial ponds, use of aeration and supplementing with artificial diet. This can increase the productivity to 871.5 kg/ha/320 days in mixed culture of prawns. Monoculture of F.indicus can yield a net profit of up to Rs.8000 (approx. US$180–200) per hectare per annum for 2 crops.

===== Semi-intensive =====
Compared with traditional type of management, semi-intensive production are on a relatively smaller scale with 0.2–2 hectare ponds and also deeper 1.0–1.5 m. Stock densities can range from 20–25 PL/m2 using hatchery derived seeds for monoculture. Natural feeds are grown by application of fertilizers and supplementary feeds are also given during the culture at a rate of 4–5 times a day. Water exchange at the rate of 30%–40% is carried out using pumps. Supplementary aeration is also provided using 4–6 aerators per hectare. A culture period may last from 100–150 days depending on various factors.

===== Intensive =====
Intensive farming is tightly controlled system of farming with very less dependence on natural foods and high level of mechanization. The ponds are also usually very small (0.1–1 ha), and the stocking density very high (50–100 PL/m2). Water exchange of around 30% daily is essential to avoid degradation of water due to high stocking density and feeding rate (5–7 times/day). Production level of around 10,000–20,000 kg/ha/yr can be achieved. A culture period lasts from 120–140 days.

==== Harvesting ====
In traditional farming harvesting is done by fitting conical nets on the sluice gates and opening them during low tide. The shrimp are trapped in the net as the water recedes. The remaining shrimp are harvested by cast netting. In semi-intensive and intensive practices, harvesting is done by complete draining of the pond. The rest of the shrimp are collected by hand.

=== Production costs and market value ===
Production cost depends on type of culture used, scale of production, number of production cycles per year, etc. It is estimated that seed production cost was US$1.6/1000. The cost of adult shrimp can range from US$4–5/kg.

The Indian shrimp has a relatively lower market value than P. monodon. Average price of white shrimp is US$5.5/kg for a size range of 21/25 shrimps per kg, while for P. monodon it is US7-13/kg. However, as F. indicus is more easily bred and reared, the relative profit gained by F.indicus may be higher per input than it seems from the above figures.

Traditionally the shrimp are exported as head-on, headless, tail-on or frozen in blocks. The profit can be increased by value-addition to the shrimp in the form of shrimp pickles, cutlets, battered, ready-to-cook, etc.
