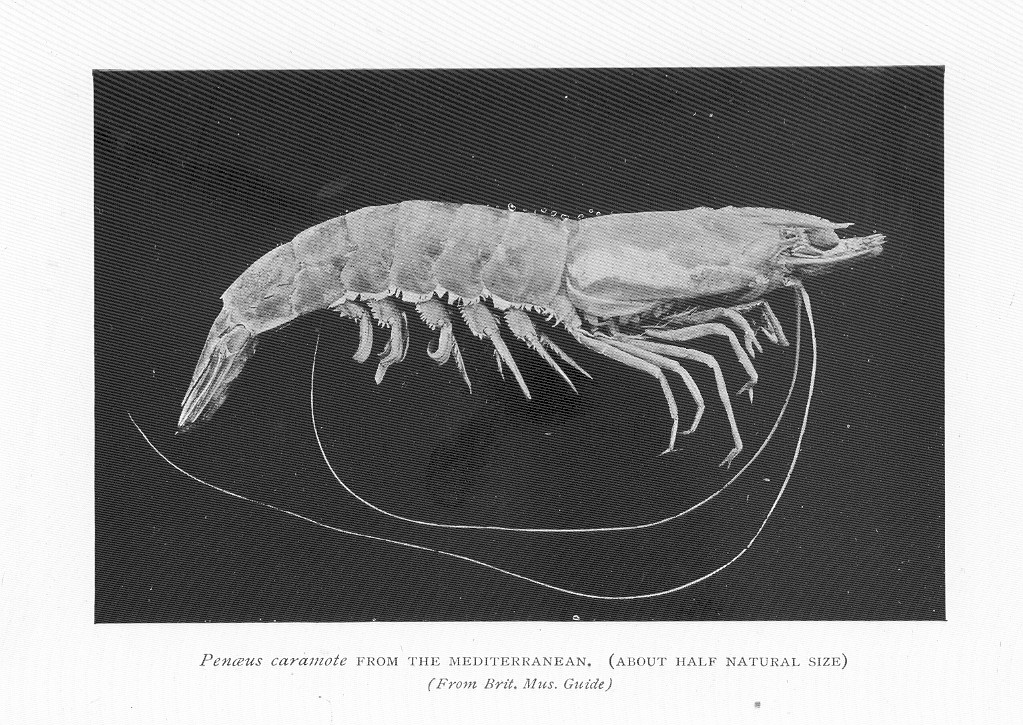

Scientific classification
- Kingdom: Animalia
- Phylum: Arthropoda
- Clade: Pancrustacea
- Class: Malacostraca
- Order: Decapoda
- Suborder: Dendrobranchiata
- Family: Penaeidae
- Genus: Melicertus
- Species: M. kerathurus

Binomial name
- Melicertus kerathurus (Forskål, 1775)

Synonyms
- Alpheus caramote Risso, 1816; Alpheus punctulatus Risso, 1822; Alpheus trisulcatus Leach, 1814 [in Leach, 1813-1814]; Cancer kerathurus Forskål, 1775; Penaeus kerathurus (Forskål, 1775); Melicertus tigrinus Rafinesque, 1814; Palaemon sulcatus Olivier, 1811; Penaeus trisulcatus Leach, 1815 (synonym); Peneus cristatus Risso, 1827; Peneus mars Risso, 1816

= Melicertus kerathurus =

Species of crustacean

Melicertus kerathurus, the striped prawn or caramote prawn is a species of tiger prawn from the family Penaeidae which occurs in the eastern Atlantic and Mediterranean Sea which is an important species in commercial fisheries. It is the type species for the genus Melicertus.

== Description ==
Melicertus kerathurus is a large shrimp, which has a body with an amber tint and a laterally compressed shell. There are five pairs of thin legs while the blue tail is often lined with red. The average length of males is 110-140 mm while females are 130-170 mm, but the females can grow up to 225mm.

== Distribution ==
Melicertus kerathurus is found in the warmer water of the eastern Atlantic from the south coast of England to Angola and throughout the entire Mediterranean Sea.

== Biology ==
Melicertus kerathurus occurs coastal marine or brackish waters with muddy-sand or sand substrates. It is normally recorded at a depths between 0.5m and 90m however is most common between 5m and 50m, although it has been taken at depths of up to 640m in the Strait of Sicily. They breed in the warmer months in inshore estuarine waters and in the winter they appear to migrate to deeper water.

== Fisheries ==
Melicertus kerathurus is exploited in an inshore fishery along all Mediterranean coasts, the prawn's large size and excellent taste make it a desirable quarry species. In West Africa the species is of minor importance and there are small fisheries in Benin and Nigeria.The total catch landed in 2015 was 7,410 tonnes. Greece and Tunisia have been the main countries landing M. kerathurus commercially in recent years,

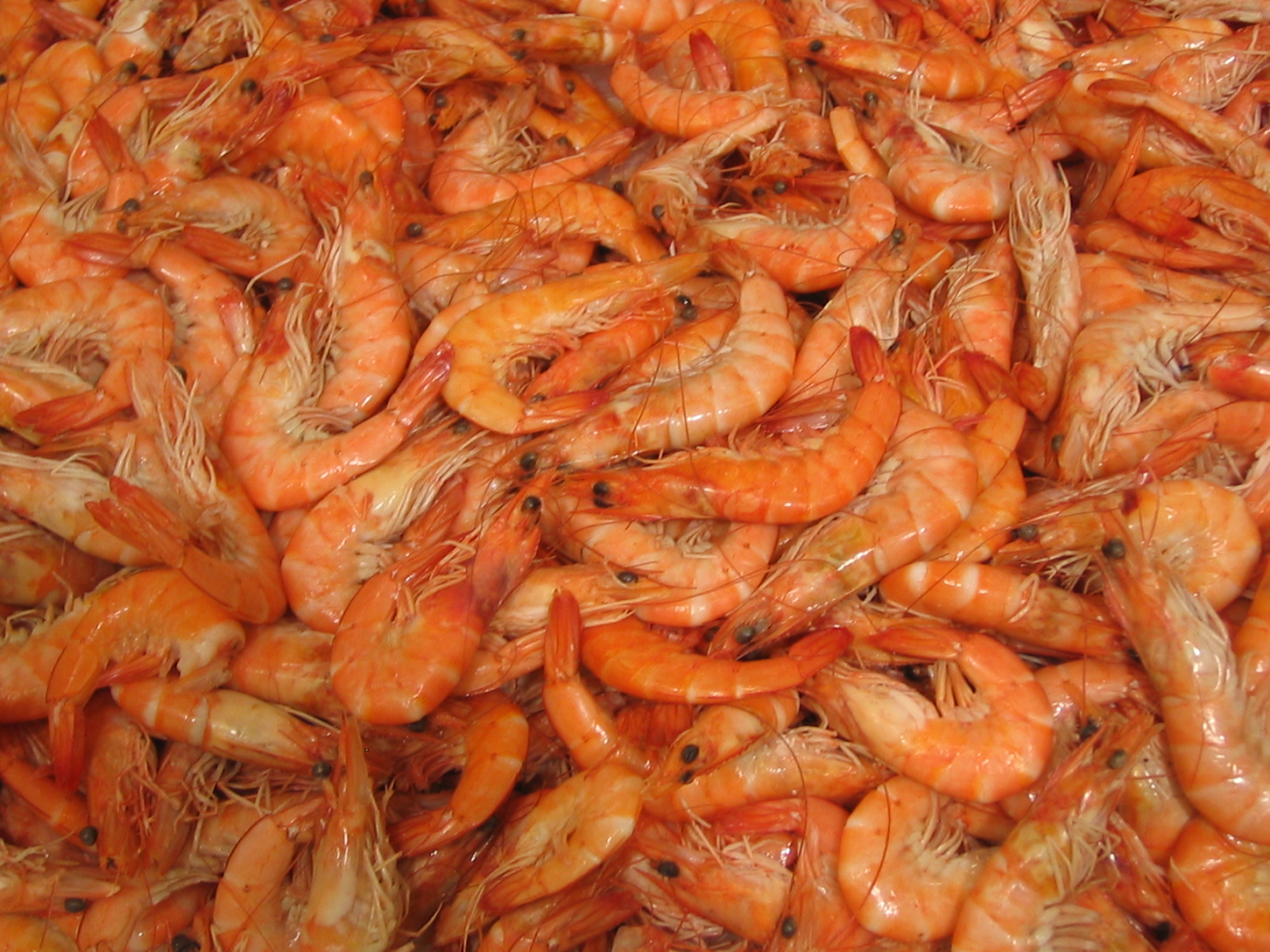
Langostinos-rafax

== Threats ==
The Lessepsian migration of Erythrian penaeid prawns through the Suez Canal into the Mediterranean may lead to increased competition for Melicertus kerathurus and the invasive Metapenaeus monoceros has already been implicated as a causal factor in the local extinction of M. kerathensis in the south-eastern Mediterranean. M. monoceros is now the most important target species for commercial, inshore, fisheries in the Gulf of Gabes, Tunisia, and off Egyptian Mediterranean coasts. In coastal lagoons the invasive prawns Penaeus pulchricaudatus and Penaeus semisulcatus make up a major portion of the prawn catch. In addition the northern brown shrimp Farfantepenaeus aztecus has now been found in the Mediterranean and may be another source of competition for M. kerathensis, as well as being a potential vector for the bopyrid parasite Epipenaeon ingens ingens.
