= Farfantepenaeus notialis =

Scientific classification
- Domain: Eukaryota
- Kingdom: Animalia
- Phylum: Arthropoda
- Class: Malacostraca
- Order: Decapoda
- Suborder: Dendrobranchiata
- Family: Penaeidae
- Genus: Farfantepenaeus
- Species: F. notialis

Binomial name
- Farfantepenaeus notialis (Pérez Farfante, 1967)

Species of crustacean

Farfantepenaeus notialis is a species of marine crustacean in the family Penaeidae.

== Distribution ==
It is found off the east coast of South America from Yucatan, Mexico to Rio de Janeiro, Brazil, and the west coast of Africa, from Mauritania to Angola. They live at depths of 3–50 metres (10–164 ft), or exceptionally up to 700 m (2,300 ft), on sandy or muddy bottoms, often among rocks.

== Description ==
Farfantepenaeus notialis reaches a total length of 175 mm (6.9 in) (males) or 192 mm (7.6 in) (females).

== Fishery ==
F. notialis and Litopenaeus schmitti are together the most important prawn species in an area extending from the Greater Antilles to Venezuela. Production peaked in 1999, with a total catch of 34,900 tonnes (76,900,000 lb), of which more than 90% was caught off Nigeria and Senegal.

== Taxonomy ==
F. notialis was first described as a subspecies of "Penaeus duorarum" (now Farfantepenaeus duorarum) by Isabel Pérez Farfante in 1967, before being recognised as a separate species. Both species have since been reassigned to the genus Farfantepenaeus. The common name preferred by the Food and Agriculture Organization is southern pink shrimp, but the species is also known as candied shrimp in the United States.
