= Pearl Lee Boone =

Invertebrate zoologist

- Born: Virginia, USA
- Other name: Lee Boone
- Scientific career
- Fields: Invertebrate Zoology
- Workplaces: National Museum of Natural History; Aquarium and Biological Laboratory in Miami; US Department of Agriculture; Bingham Oceanographic Foundation at Yale
- Author abbrev. (zoology): PL Boone, L Boone

Pearl Lee Boone (c. 1895/1896 –1954) was an American invertebrate zoologist at the Smithsonian's National Museum of Natural History. She was one of the more infamous carcinologists of her time, as her career was fraught with claims of incompetence and disagreements about the veracity of her work in identifications.

== Life and career ==
Boone was born in Virginia in 1895 or 1896. Her father was born in Maryland and her mother was born in Virginia.

Boone began at the United States National Museum, now the National Museum of Natural History in 1913. She was originally an entomological preparator for the United States Department of Agriculture in the Division of Insects at the museum. In 1916, she was hired as an aid for the Division of Marine Invertebrates at the museum, where she was paid $900 per year. In 1918, she was given a raise to be paid $1,020 per year. During her time at the museum, she earned a BA in 1919, M.S. and B. ed. in 1920 from George Washington University. In 1921 she was asked to resign from her position at the museum after an investigation had been conducted by the museum. During her time at the museum she was accused of incompetence by Waldo Schmitt and other colleagues, while she claimed she was harassed by him. After she left the museum, she worked at the Aquarium and Biological Laboratory in Miami and the US Department of Agriculture. Finally, she was a research associate at the Bingham Oceanographic Foundation at Yale, now part of the Yale Peabody Museum's Division of Vertebrate Zoology ichthyology collection. The ideas of incompetence followed her for her whole career.

In 1922, she requested to have access to the National Museum's collections while working on a report that would be published by the Miami Aquarium Association. This request was vehemently opposed by Schmitt, but he was not in charge of allowing access. Schmitt had also written in a few letters to others in the field expressing his dislike of Boone. Also, in 1922, Boone was a member of the Biological Society of Washington.

Boone lived in Hyattsville, Maryland as she worked as an aide for the National Museum and the Department of Agriculture. The Washington, D.C. directory listed her from 1913 to 1923. Her job description in 1923, after she had left the museum, was a junior biologist for the Department of Agriculture. In 1930, she lived in Manhattan as a biologist of oceanic research working on her own account.

Boone went by a few names over the course of her career. She went primarily by Peal Lee Boone, but later on changed to Lee Boone and even Mr. Lee Boone. On one letter in 1917 while she was at the Smithsonian she signed herself as Virginia Lee Boone.

She died in 1954.

== Select publications ==
- L Boone. 1930. Notes on the West Indian crabs of the genus Actaea. Bulletin of the AMNH; v. 61, article 3.
- Boone, Pearl L. “Descriptions of Ten New Isopods.” Proceedings of the United States National Museum, vol. 54, no. 2253, 1918, pp. 591–604., doi:10.5479/si.00963801.54-2253.591.
- Boone, Lee. “A RARE SPIDER CRAB FROM CALIFORNIA. (MITHRAX ROSTRATUS BELL” American Museum Novitates, no. 399, 23 Jan. 1930, pp. 1–4.
- Boone, Pearl L. “A New Chinese Isopod, Ichthyoxenus Geei.” Proceedings of the United States National Museum, vol. 57, no. 2319, 1920, pp. 497–502., doi:10.5479/si.00963801.57-2319.497.
- Boone, Lee. “SCIENTIFIC RESULTS OF THE FIRST OCEANOGRAPHIC EXPEDITION OF THE ‘PAWNEE’ 1925. CRUSTACEA FROM TROPICAL EAST AMERICAN SEAS. .” Bulletin of the Bingham Oceanographic Collection, 1925, pp. 1–77.
- Boone, Lee. “A Collection of Anomuran and Macruran Crustacea from the bay of Panama and the fresh waters of the Canal Zone.” Bulletin of the American Museum of Natural History, vol. 63, 30 Dec. 1930, pp. 137–190.
- Boone, Lee. “New and Rare Cuban and Haitian Terrestrial Isopoda.” Bulletin of the American Museum of Natural History, vol. 66, 12 Sept. 1934, pp. 567–598.
- Boone, Lee. “A Collection of Brachyuran Crustacea from the Bay of Panama and the Fresh Waters of the Canal Zone.” Bulletin of the American Museum of Natural History, vol. 58, 1929.
- Boone, Lee. "Bulletin: A COLLECTION OF ANOMURAN AND MACRURAN CRUSTACEA FROM THE BAY OF PANAMA AND THE FRESH WATERS OF THE CANAL ZONE"
