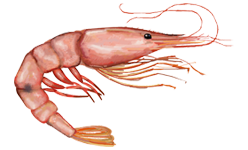

Scientific classification
- Kingdom: Animalia
- Phylum: Arthropoda
- Clade: Pancrustacea
- Class: Malacostraca
- Order: Decapoda
- Suborder: Dendrobranchiata
- Family: Penaeidae
- Genus: Farfantepenaeus
- Species: F. duorarum

Binomial name
- Farfantepenaeus duorarum (Burkenroad, 1939)

Synonyms
- Penaeus duorarum Burkenroad, 1939

= Farfantepenaeus duorarum =

Species of crustacean

Farfantepenaeus duorarum is a species of marine penaeid shrimp found around Bermuda, along the east coast of the United States and in the Gulf of Mexico. They are a significant commercial species in the United States and Cuba.

== Distribution ==
Farfantepenaeus duorarum are found in the Atlantic around Bermuda, along the coast of the United States from Massachusetts to Texas, and along the Mexican coast from Tamaulipas to Campeche. They live at depths of 2–70 metres (7–230 ft), exceptionally to 230 m (750 ft), with highest densities at 11–36 m (36–118 ft), on compacted mud, silt or sandy bottoms, or amongst shells. Juveniles are found in marine or estuarine waters, while adults are marine.

== Description ==
Females grow up to 280 mm (11 in) long, and males 269 mm (10.6 in) long.

== Fishery ==
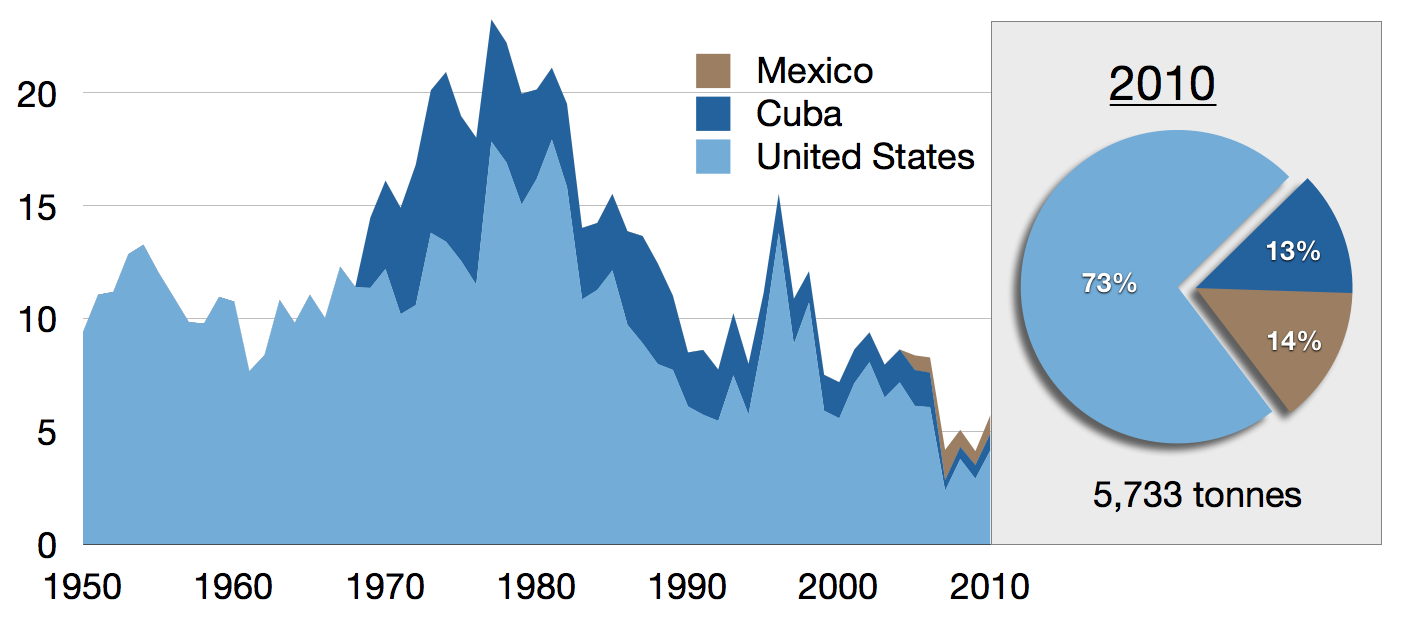
Global capture of Farfantepenaeus duorarum in thousand tonnes reported by the FAO, 1950–2010

== Taxonomy ==
Farfantepenaeus duorarum was first described by Martin Burkenroad in 1939, under the name Penaeus duorarum.

In 1967, Isabel Pérez Farfante separated P. duorarum into two subspecies: northern P. d. duorarum and southern P. d. notialis, where notialis is Latin for 'southern'.

By 1980, the northern and southern pink shrimp were being treated as distinct species, rather than subspecies.

It was transferred to Farfantepenaeus when that new genus was erected by Rudolf N. Burukovsky in 1997.

The FAO's preferred name for the species is northern pink shrimp; other common names, used in the US, are pink shrimp, spotted shrimp, pink-spotted shrimp, brown-spotted shrimp, grooved shrimp, green shrimp, pink night shrimp, red shrimp, hopper ("Dettloff brown"), skipper, pushed shrimp and bait shrimp.
