= Qavamabad-e Chichaklu =

Qavamabad-e Chichaklu قوام ابادچيچكلو
- Village
- Location within Iran
- Coordinates: 30°05′29″N 52°27′03″E
- Country: Iran
- Province: Fars
- County: Sepidan
- Bakhsh: Beyza
- Rural District: Banesh

Population (2006)
  - Total: 455
- Time zone: UTC+3:30 (IRST)
  - Summer (DST): UTC+4:30 (IRDT)

Qavamabad-e Chichaklu (Persian: قوام ابادچيچكلو, also Romanized as Qavāmābād-e Chīchaklū; also known as ChīChaklū, Chūchaklū, and Lakāh) is a village in Banesh Rural District, Beyza District, Sepidan County, Fars province, Iran. At the 2006 census, its population was 455, in 98 families.
