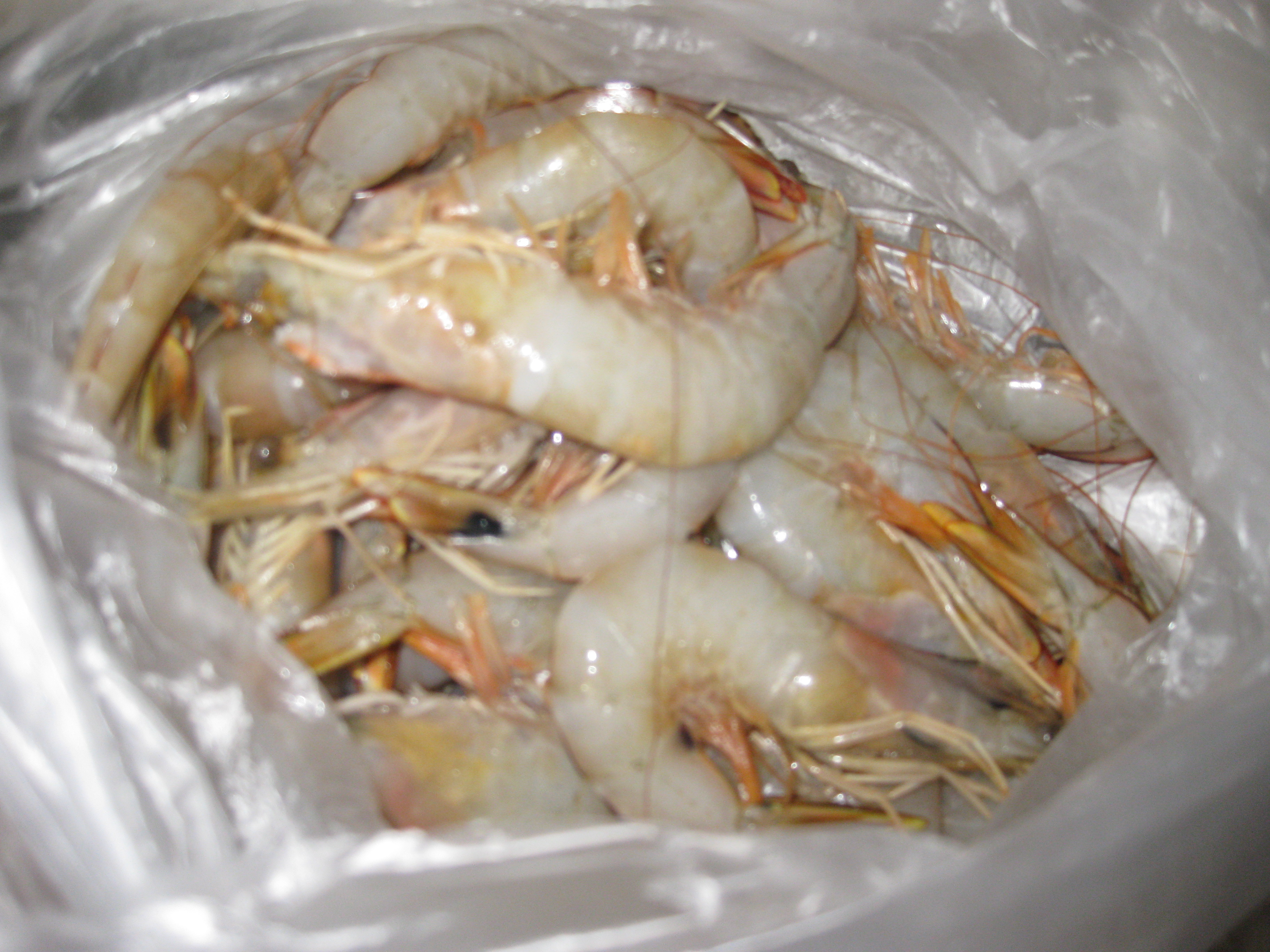

Scientific classification
- Kingdom: Animalia
- Phylum: Arthropoda
- Clade: Pancrustacea
- Class: Malacostraca
- Order: Decapoda
- Suborder: Dendrobranchiata
- Family: Penaeidae
- Genus: Fenneropenaeus
- Species: F. merguiensis

Binomial name
- Fenneropenaeus merguiensis (De Man, 1888)

Synonyms
- Penaeus merguiensis; Fenneropenaeus merguiensis; Penaeus (Fenneropenaeus) merguiensis

= Fenneropenaeus merguiensis =

Species of crustacean

Fenneropenaeus merguiensis, the banana prawn, is a species of prawn in the family Penaeidae. It is widely caught for food.

The species has been classified variously in genus Penaeus, Fenneropenaeus (Pérez Farfante, 1969), and most recently in Penaeus subgenus Fenneropenaeus (Chan, 2023). Its FAO code is PBA. The species was first described from the Mergui Archipelago by Johannes Govertus de Man in 1888.
