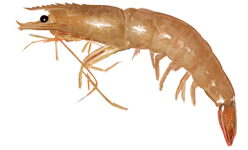

Scientific classification
- Kingdom: Animalia
- Phylum: Arthropoda
- Class: Malacostraca
- Order: Decapoda
- Suborder: Dendrobranchiata
- Family: Penaeidae
- Genus: Farfantepenaeus
- Species: F. aztecus

Binomial name
- Farfantepenaeus aztecus (Ives, 1891)

= Farfantepenaeus aztecus =

Species of shrimp

Farfantepenaeus aztecus is a species of marine penaeid shrimps found around the east coast of the US and Mexico. They are an important commercial species in the US. The FAO refers to them as the northern brown shrimp; other common names, used in the US, are brown shrimp, golden shrimp, red shrimp or redtail shrimp.

== Distribution ==
Farfantepenaeus aztecus are found along the US Atlantic coast from Massachusetts to Texas, and along the Atlantic coast of Mexico from Tamaulipas to Campeche. They live at depths of 4–160 metres (13–525 ft), with highest densities at 27–54 m (89–177 ft), on muddy, peat, sandy or clay bottoms, or amongst broken shells. Juveniles are found in marine or estuarine waters, while adults are marine. This species has now been confirmed to occur in the Mediterranean, probably introduced in ship's ballast water, where it seems to be spreading and may threaten stocks of the native Melicertus kerathurus . In the southern coast of Sicily (central Mediterranean Sea), the species appears well established.

== Description ==
Females reach a total length of 236 mm (9.3 in) and males 195 mm (7.7 in).

== Fishery ==
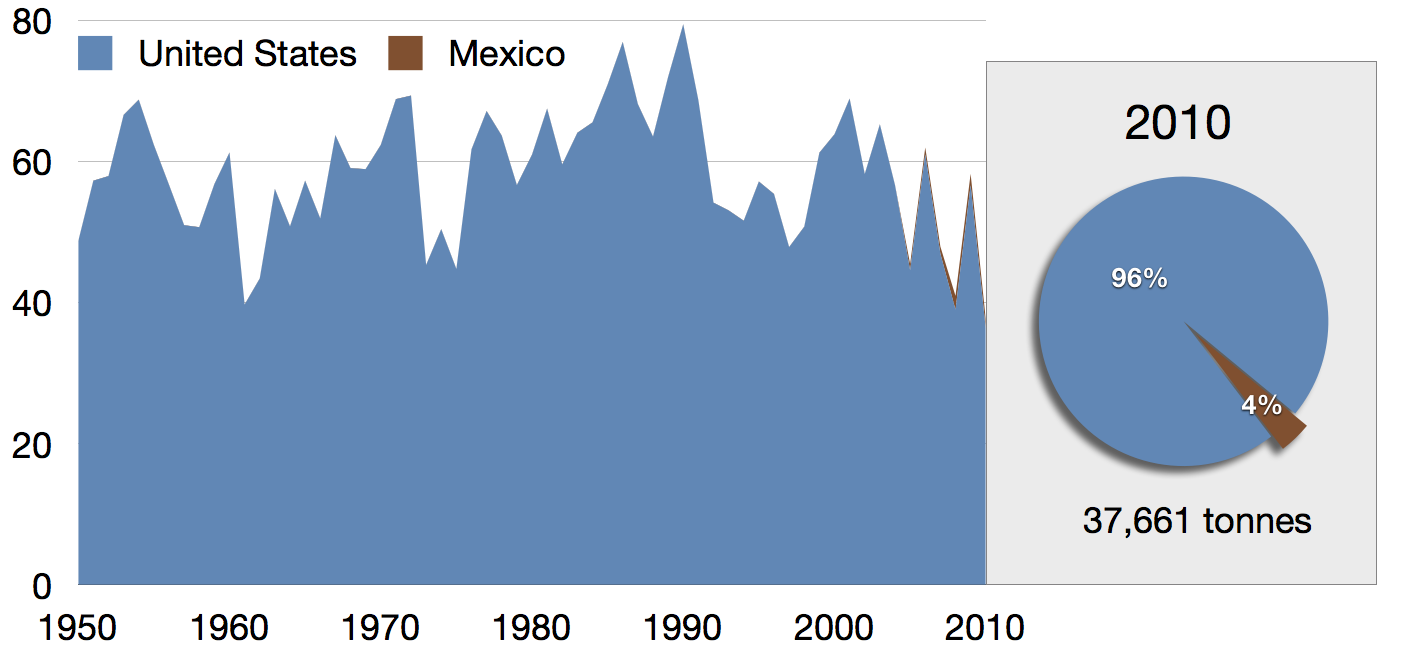
Global capture of Farfantepenaeus aztecus in thousand tonnes reported by the FAO, 1950–2010

In the United States, 80,000,000 pounds (36,000 t) of F. aztecus were landed in 2010, more than half of which was from the state of Texas.

== Taxonomy ==
Farfantepenaeus aztecus was first described by J. E. Ives in an 1891 paper in the Proceedings of the Academy of Natural Sciences of Philadelphia, as a variety of "Penæus brasiliensis" (now Farfantepenaeus brasiliensis). The type locality was Veracruz, on the Mexico's Gulf coast . He distinguished the new variety on the basis of the extreme lengths of the antennal flagellum, which is 7–10× longer than the length of the carapace. "P. aztecus" was later treated as a full species, and when he erected the subgenus Farfantepenaeus, Rudolf Burukovsky included "P. aztecus" among the species included in that subgenus. Farfantepenaeus was later raised to the rank of genus by Isabel Pérez Farfante and Brian Kensley, giving the species its current name of Farfantepenaeus aztecus.
