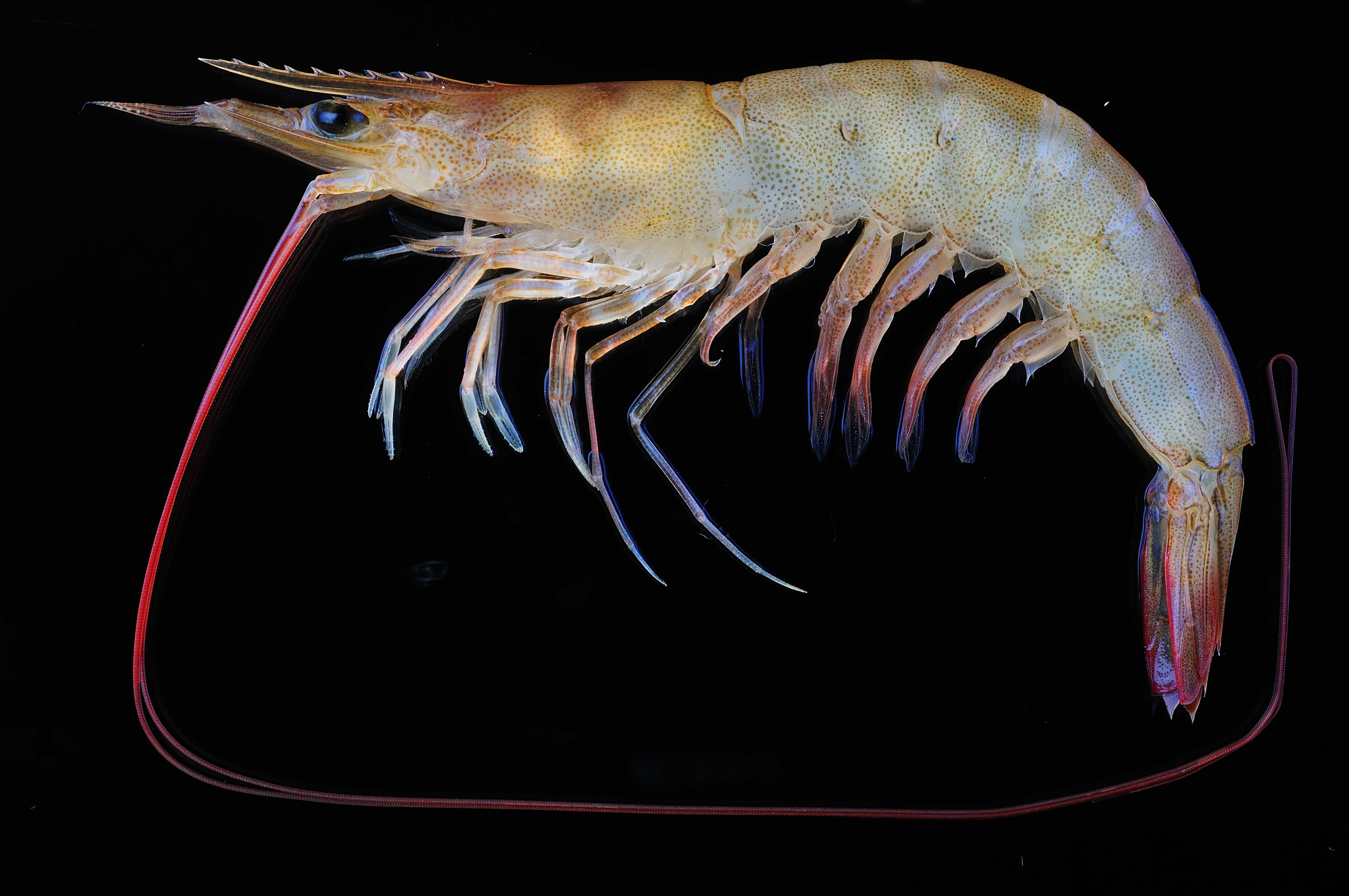

Scientific classification
- Kingdom: Animalia
- Phylum: Arthropoda
- Class: Malacostraca
- Order: Decapoda
- Suborder: Dendrobranchiata
- Family: Penaeidae
- Genus: Metapenaeus
- Species: M. monoceros

Binomial name
- Metapenaeus monoceros (Fabricius, 1798)

Synonyms
- Metapenaeus cognatus Nobili, 1904; Metapenaeus deschampsi Nobili, 1903; Penaeopsis monoceros (Fabricius, 1798); Penaeopsis spinulicauda Stebbing, 1914; Penaeus monoceros Fabricius, 1798

= Metapenaeus monoceros =

Species of crustacean

Metapenaeus monoceros is a species of prawn in the family Penaeidae. It is also known as speckled shrimp, brown shrimp and pink shrimp in English, crevette mouchetée in French, camarón moteado in Spanish, koraney chingri or honye chingri in India, ginger prawn in South Africa and choodan chemmeen in Malayalam.

== Distribution and ecology ==
Metapenaeus monoceros is native to the Indo-West Pacific from Durban to the Red Sea along the African coast and around India. Now it has also invaded into the eastern Mediterranean Sea through the Suez Canal, eliminating population of the native species Melicertus kerathurus in those areas.

Metapenaeus monoceros is found up to a depth of 170 metres (560 ft) but commonly found between 10 m (33 ft) and 30 m (98 ft). They prefer sandy or sandy mud bottoms. They live in brackish water or marine ecosystem.

== Description ==
Adult M. monoceros are pale grey with dark brown spots giving them the name brown shrimp or speckled shrimp. Their body is covered with short hairs. They have red–orange antennae. They are medium-sized prawns with males growing up to 15 centimetres (5.9 in) and females growing up to 20 cm (7.9 in). Males have a prominent curved spine on fifth pereiopod (walking leg). The maximum recorded weight is 170 grams (6.0 oz), but most individuals weigh less than 30 g (1.1 oz).

== Reproduction ==
Metapenaeus monoceros is believed to be a continuous breeder with two major spawning seasons. These seasons were found to vary with time and location and environmental factors. In Tunisia, spawning seasons are May–June and October–November. In Egypt, May and July–October were found to be the spawning seasons. In Turkey spawning occurred between November and January. In India, December–April and August–September are the two main spawning seasons. Similarly, minimum size at sexual maturity also varied across range and possibly with sampling seasons, with males reaching sexual maturity from 7.5 cm (3.0 in) in Turkey, 7.6 cm (3.0 in) in Tunisia, and 9.5 cm (3.7 in) in India and Egypt. Size at maturity for females were 11.4 cm (4.5 in) in India, 11.6 cm (4.6 in) in Turkey and 12.2 cm (4.8 in) in Tunisia.

== Commercial importance ==
Metapenaeus monoceros is of commercial importance throughout its range. It is important in African coastal countries, India, Pakistan, Bangladesh, Turkey, Israel and Egypt.
