= Melicertus =

Scientific classification
- Kingdom: Animalia
- Phylum: Arthropoda
- Clade: Pancrustacea
- Class: Malacostraca
- Order: Decapoda
- Suborder: Dendrobranchiata
- Family: Penaeidae
- Genus: Melicertus; Rafinesque, 1814

Type species
- Melicertus tigrinus as a synonym of Melicertus kerathurus Rafinesque-Schmaltz, 1814 p. 22

Genus of crustaceans

Melicertus is a genus of "king" prawns, comprising eight species which were previously classified as members of the genus Penaeus:

- Melicertus canaliculatus (Olivier, 1811) - witch prawn
- Melicertus hathor (Burkenroad, 1959) - (Red Sea, invasive to Mediterranean)
- Melicertus kerathurus (Forskål, 1775) - caramote prawn, striped prawn (Eastern Atlantic, Mediterranean)
- Melicertus latisulcatus (Kishinouye, 1896) - western king prawn, Spencer Gulf prawn (Australia)
- Melicertus longistylus (Kubo, 1943) - redspot king prawn
- Melicertus marginatus (Randall, 1840) - aloha prawn
- Melicertus plebejus (Hess, 1865) - eastern king prawn (Australia)
- Melicertus similis Chanda & Bhattacharya, 2002

In 2023, based on a molecular phylogenetic analysis by Yang et al., Chan proposed a reclassification of Peneaus into eleven subgenera. In this system, only the East-Atlantic type species Melicertus kerathurus is retained in Peneaus (Melicertus). The new proposed subgenus Penaeus (Oleopenaeus) contains P. (O.) hathor P. (O.) latisulcatus, and P. (O.) plebejus. Penaeus (Plagosopenaeus) canaliculatus, Penaeus (Altiopeneaus) marginatus, and Penaeus (Ischiopenaeus) longistylus (subgenera nova) are monospecific. The "enigmatic" M. similis is believed to represent juveniles of P. (I.) longistylus.
