= National Aquaculture Development Plan =

The National Aquaculture Development Plan (NADP) is a United States national plan to foster sustainable growth in the aquaculture sector. It was established by the National Aquaculture Act of 1980.

== Background ==
In 1980, the National Aquaculture Act was enacted to promote and support the development of private aquaculture and to ensure coordination among the various federal agencies that have aquaculture programs and policies. It provided for a national aquaculture policy, including the development of a formal National Aquaculture Development Plan.

=== Objectives ===
The National Aquaculture Development Plan outlines several core objectives:

1. Promote Economic Growth: Encourage investment in the aquaculture sector to create jobs and boost local economies
2. Ensure Sustainability: Establish guidelines for environmentally responsible aquaculture practices
3. Enhance Food Security: Increase domestic seafood production to reduce reliance on imports
4. Support Innovation: Foster research and development in aquaculture technologies and practices
5. Facilitate Regulatory Streamlining: Simplify and harmonize federal and state aquaculture permitting processes
6. Promote Public-Private Partnerships: Collaborate with stakeholders to address industry challenges and opportunities

=== Funding ===
The NADP is supported by federal appropriations, with additional funding from private sector investments and state-level grants. The NADP dedicates funding for developing disease-resistant aquatic species, improving aquaculture feed efficiency, exploring offshore aquaculture opportunities, and utilizing technology for automated monitoring and management. The plan also includes public awareness campaigns to highlight the benefits of sustainable aquaculture, address misconceptions about farmed seafood, and provide technical training for aspiring aquaculture professionals.

== Stakeholders ==
The NADP is a multi-agency effort involving:

- Executive Office of the President, National Science and Technology Council, Joint Subcommittee on Aquaculture: Publishes and disseminates the plan (federal interagency coordinating group)
- National Oceanic and Atmospheric Administration: Leads the implementation and coordination of the plan, providing scientific and policy expertise to support sustainable aquaculture development
- United States Department of Agriculture: Supports research and providing grants to promote aquaculture innovation and best practices
- United States Environmental Protection Agency: Ensures compliance with environmental regulations to protect ecosystems affected by aquaculture activities
- United States Department of Commerce: Contributes to the development of economic growth strategies and policies that support the aquaculture industry
- Food and Drug Administration: Oversees the safety and quality of aquaculture products, ensuring they meet health standards for consumers
- United States Fish and Wildlife Service: Engages in aquaculture activities that support fisheries restoration, raise aquatic wildlife, and protect threatened and endangered species
- United States Department of Interior: Contributes to conservation efforts and the sustainable management of aquatic resources
- State Governments: Collaborating on localized aquaculture initiatives

== Timeline ==
- The two volume Aquaculture Development Plan was initially published in 1983 by the Joint Subcommittee on Aquaculture.
- In 2020, President Donald Trump signed Executive Order 13921, Promoting American Seafood Competitiveness and Economic Growth, calling for an update to the NADP. The Subcommittee on Aquaculture announced three components of the updated plan: the National Strategic Plan for Aquaculture Research, the Strategic Plan to Enhance Regulatory Efficiency in Aquaculture, and the Strategic Plan for Aquaculture Economic Development.
- In December 2024, a new edition of the Aquaculture Development Plan was published.
