= Urban aquaculture =

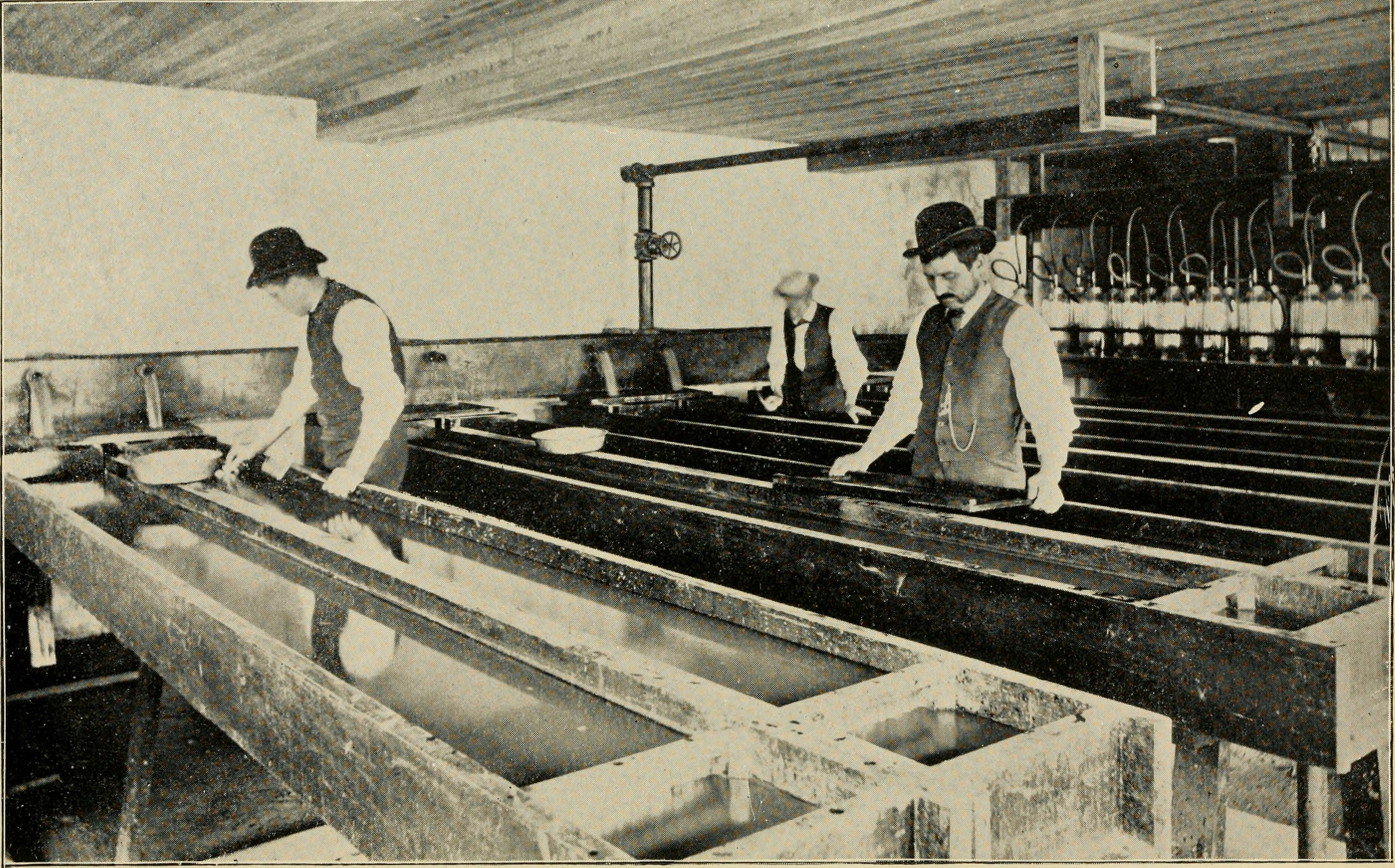
Artificial propagation of the Atlantic salmon, rainbow trout, and brook trout (circa 1900)

Urban aquaculture is aquaculture of fish, shellfish, and marine plants in rivers, ponds, lakes, canals located within an urban environment. Urban aquaculture systems can be associated with a multitude of different production locations, species used, environment, and production intensity. The use of urban aquaculture has increased over the last several years as societies continue to urbanise and demand for food in urban environments increases. Methods of production include recirculating systems; land-based culture systems; multifunctional wetlands; ponds, borrow pits and lakes; cages and culture-based fisheries. Most production in urban environments will include either extensive (productivity is based solely on natural runoff) or intensive (tanks and cages of monoculture production), compared to aquaculture in general, which is normally semi-intensive.

== History ==
Aquaculture dates to 1000 BCE in China. Early examples of European urban aquaculture could be found in Roman villas, followed by monasteries, castles, manors and millponds” in medieval Europe. The practice variously represented advancements in technology, ways to demonstrate social status, a means to avoid poor fish capture, and an increasing consumer demand for seafood. Significant historical upheavals, such as the fall of the Roman Empire and both the depopulation and economic regression that occurred during the medieval time period disrupted and undermined the practice.

A reemergence of aquaculture became noticeable during the industrialisation era. Urban aquaculture long existed at some level in many areas, but is considered by some to have emerged from the end of World War II through the 1970s, brought on by consumer demand for more seafood and shifting from small-scale community activity to commercial enterprise during this span. The practice has gone global, and continued to steadily increase around the world in the last decade, mostly due to increasing demand for shrimps and prawns by developed countries. Aquaculture also provides an alternative livelihood for fishermen faced with the reduction of natural marine populations from overfishing and climate change.

Aquaculture is most dominant in Asia, which produces about 75% of the world’s total fisheries and aquaculture volume; a large proportion of that Asian production comes from China, which accounts for about 40-60% of global aquatic animal production. While aquaculture is commonly practices on an industrial basis, the three most farmed fish - grass carp, Nile tilapia, and common carp are from small scale aquaculture.

== Types of use ==
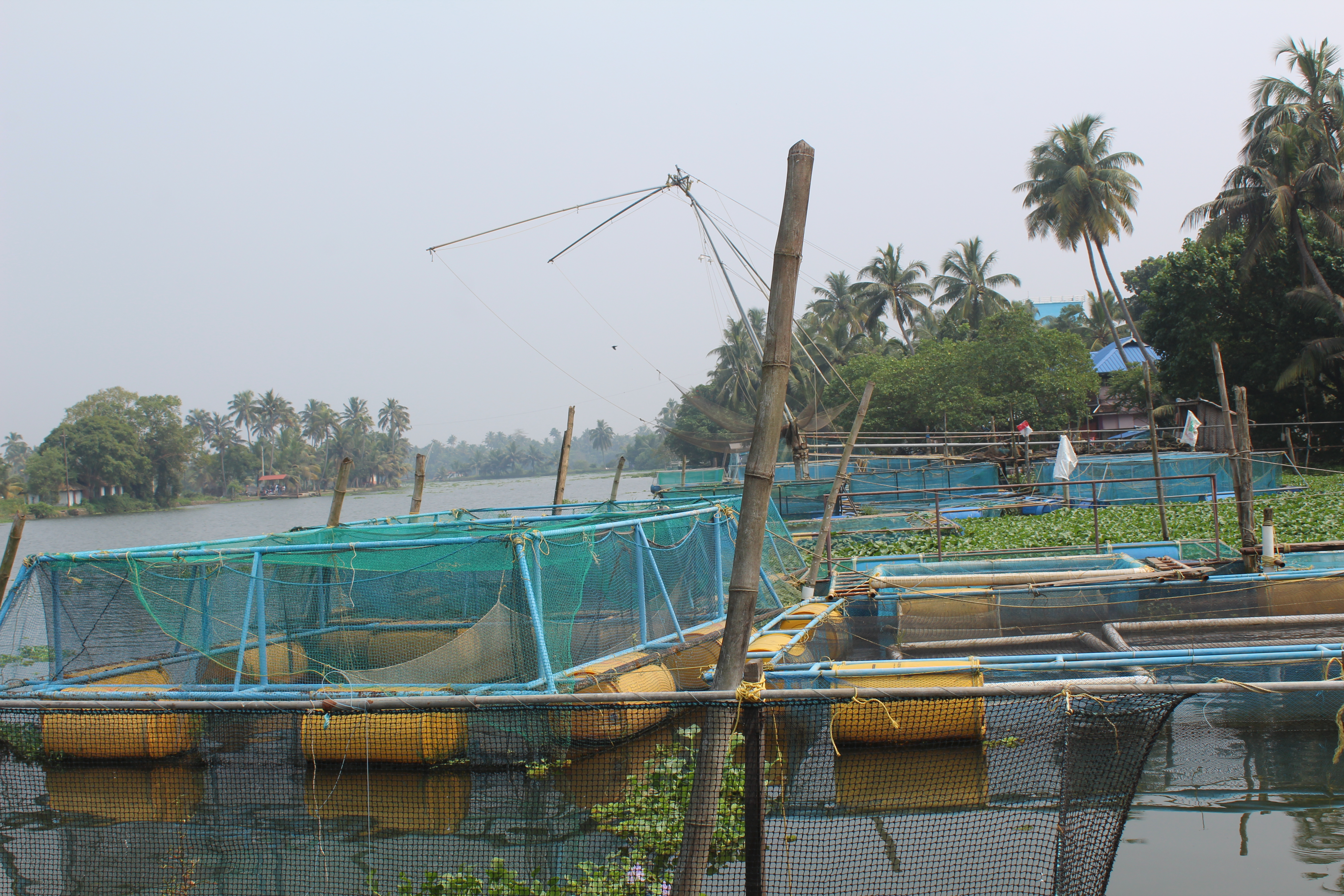
Raising fish in cages in a lake in a relatively undeveloped environment

Urban aquaculture makes use of different production systems: water-based systems—most commonly cages and pens; land-based systems—such as ponds, tanks, and raceways; recirculating systems, which are enclosed and highly controlled; and irrigation systems, which can also be used to raise fish alongside crops, for example, in rice paddies.

Production methods currently used in Europe include recirculation units, horizontally integrated marine aquaculture facilities, and systems exploiting industrial byproducts.

Urban aquaculture is practiced on land-based culture systems; multifunctional wetlands; ponds, borrow pits and lakes; cages and culture-based fisheries.

Recirculating aquaculture systems (RAS) employ water reuse systems used in many areas.

== Impacts ==
Optimal water parameters for cold- and warm-water fish in intensive aquaculture
Acidity	pH 6–9
Arsenic	<440 μg/L
Alkalinity	>20 mg/L (as CaCO_{3})
Aluminum	<0.075 mg/L
Ammonia (non-ionized)	<O.O2mg/L
Cadmium	<0.0005 mg/L in soft water; <0.005 mg/L in hard water
Calcium	>5 mg/L
Carbon dioxide	<5–10 mg/L
Chloride	>4.0 mg/L
Chlorine	<0.003 mg/L
Copper	<0.0006 mg/L in soft water; <0.03 mg/L in hard water
Gas supersaturation	<100% total gas pressure (103% for salmonid eggs/fry) (102% for lake trout)
Hydrogen sulfide	<0.003 mg/L
Iron	<0.1 mg/L
Lead	<0.02 mg/L
Mercury	<0.0002 mg/L
Nitrate	<1.0 mg/L
Nitrite	<0.1 mg/L
Oxygen	6 mg/L for coldwater fish 4 mg/L for warmwater fish
Selenium	<0.01 mg/L
Total dissolved solids	<200 mg/L
Total suspended solids	<80 NTU over ambient levels
Zinc	<0.005 mg/L

=== Advantages ===
The potential opportunities include: underprivileged community members may be able to access more affordable food; local production of fish and aquatic plants may prevent food insecurity; livelihoods may improve; and there may be opportunities for high returns on investment. The vast amount of research that Bunting and Little have conducted on this subject gives great legitimacy to their overview of the costs and benefits of urban aquaculture.

The urban aquaculture is of great and undeniable importance, and has multiple benefits, such as securing food and maintaining the offered goods to meet the market's demand, as well as guaranteeing numerous job opportunities and stable income for many families (Bunting et al.). The most important thing urban aquaculture provides to the society and the environment is the fact that it reuses wastewater and by-products from agriculture (Bunting et al.). This offers a valid solution to the problem of limited access to resources and this is why the urban aquaculture should be more widespread and encouraged for all the benefits it brings to the society as a whole.

Another advantage is definitely for the economy. Aquaculture is a great alternative food source and fuel source. It can increase the number of possible jobs since it provides new products and more labor (Bunting and Little, 455). When talking about environmental benefits, aquaculture helps reduce pollution with the help of mollusks and seaweed. It gives a way for sustainable use of sea resources and helps conserve biodiversity. Finally, it reduces the overall environmental disturbance because there is a decreased need for the fishing of wild stock and it provides alternative farming options.

=== Disadvantages ===
According to Bunting and Little the constraints of urban aquaculture include, production variations, denying access to underprivileged members of a community; urban sprawl; user competition; theft; resource contamination; environmental pollution; high capital costs; financial risks; susceptibility to disease; technical failures; and volatile market conditions. According to one of the authors assessment on urban aquaculture, the world's population residing in cities exceeded half of the total in 2007 and a lot of them getting by in poor economic status.

Bunting and Little (2003) recommends a system-based approach for aquaculture. In the annotated bibliography provided, it was also notable that soil fertility is quickly declining. In addition, by 2030 about ¾ of Latin American will be in cities. This makes it all the more important for urban means of food production. Twenty percent of the food produced by the world is from urban.

Those against aquaculture claim that this method does not help in reducing waste, but rather cause it. In this way, aquaculture becomes a threat to the coastal ecosystem. Many say that it actually contaminates water and threatens the health of those who use that water. Also, some fish food can be contaminated by pesticides and chemicals used to feed the fish. It is said that aquaculture generally has a negative impact on the environment since it has to destroy in order to build fish cages and tanks.

== Implementation ==
=== New York City ===
Schreibman and Zarnoch discuss the potential results of implementing urban aquaculture. To do so they use New York City, United States as a model site. They provide great detail on the process of moving “urban aquaculture from concept to practice…” in this specific location. Schreibman and Zarnoch (2009) states that the United States’ strict standard for food production is an open door for good food production from aquaculture. They discuss the potential impacts such systems might have on the environment and economy in metropolitan areas. According to the authors, the success of aquaculture is dependent on the financial support it receives.

=== Cape Town ===
Aquaculture was implemented in Cape Town to produce more than two tons of fish annually. Some entrepreneurs like Alan Flemming, whose aim is to provide food to low income communities through an innovative urban aquaculture system, which already received global recognition. With the technology applied, the aquaculture farm supplied Cape Town's 39 top restaurants. Places like Cape Town tried to implement aquaculture and are now producing more than two tons of fish annually.

=== Brazil ===
Successful implementation of aquaculture would mean it is a sustainable and functioning method of aquaculture use. Implementation requires careful and concise planning with emphasis on environment preservation, rather than destruction. In Brazil, the government has been promoting studies on zoning and demarcation of aquaculture parks, which could, if successfully carried out, make Brazil the largest producers of fish in net-cages in the world.

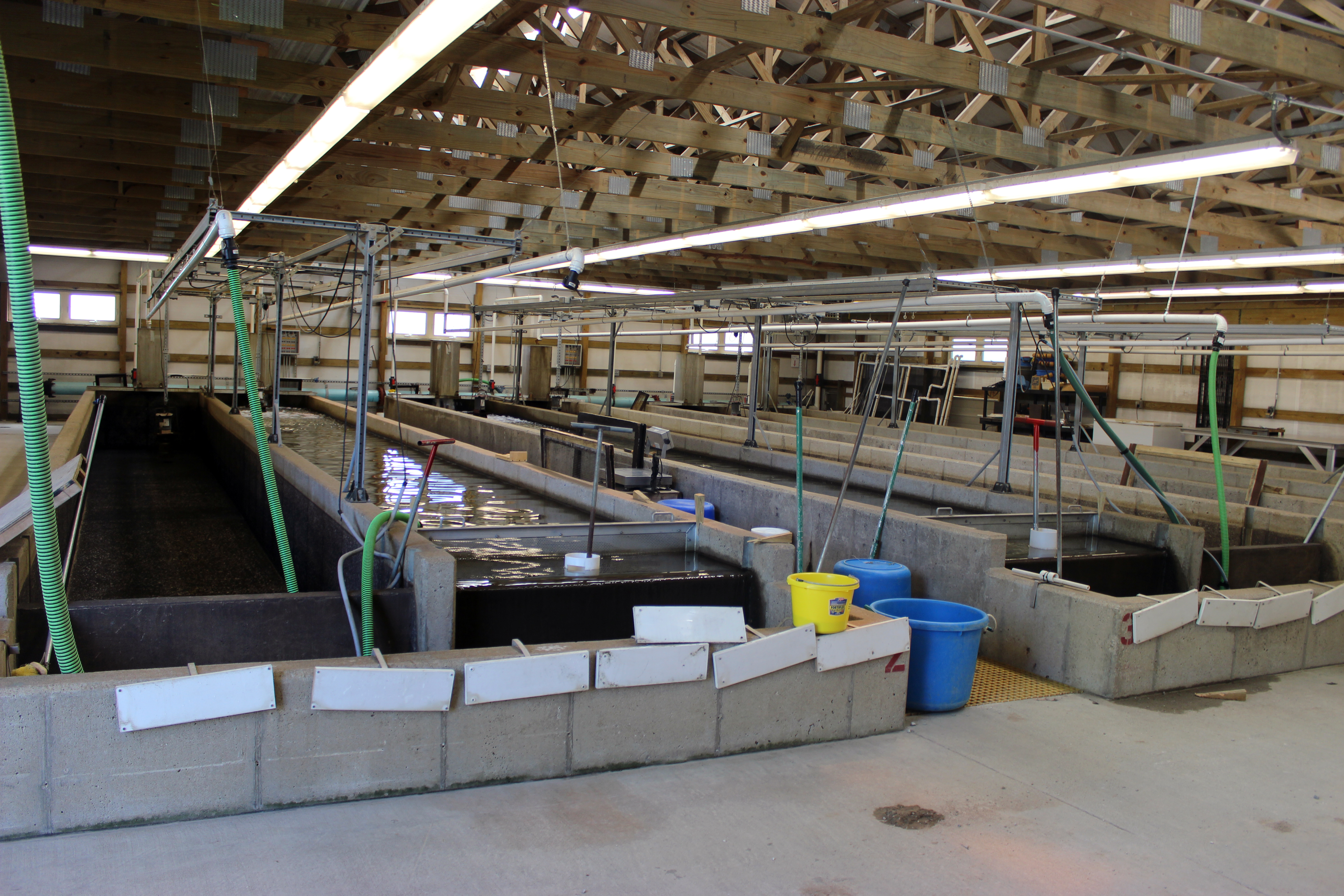
Raceways at Missouri's Blind Pony State Fish Hatchery rear several fish species for stocking waters with their urban fishing program.

== Systems ==
As urban aquacultures are starting to become more wide spread, especially in coastal areas, it is only logical to observe and study the systems used in the production of the fish and all the other products. Three systems differ from one another in the intensity with which they are managed. The systems are extensive, semi-intensive, and intensive:

- The extensive aquaculture is mainly characterized by increased dependence on natural food in the process of producing the stock (Bunting et al.).
- The semi-intensive production, on the other hand, is primarily based on the fertilizer applications; this is done to improve the natural food production and to maintain the use of low-protein supplements.
- As for the intensively managed systems, they depend on externally sourced high-protein input feed. Also, the by-products and waste resources are utilized and used to produce food of high protein value and level, such as tubifex worms and fly larvae, to supply aquaculture producers. This highlights the different means of production of the urban aquaculture and how they are maintained and integrated in the process of farming the fish and the other products.

Extensive aquaculture systems are usually conducted in medium- to large-sized ponds or other water bodies. Fish production depends on the natural productivity of the water, making this system low-cost and low-maintenance. With semi-intensive fish farming, the production of fish per unit is low. However, they tend to be incomplete and are rarely used as a sole food source. Intensive fish farming results a high weight of fish produced per unit of rearing area.

== See also ==
- Aquaculture
