= Biofloc Technology =

Aquaculture system using microbial biotechnology

Biofloc technology (BFT) is a system of aquaculture that uses "microbial biotechnology to increase the efficacy and utilization of fish feeds, where toxic materials such as nitrogen components are treated and converted to a useful product, like a protein for use as supplementary feeds to the fish and crustaceans."

In high nitrogen environments, the beneficial heterotrophic bacteria are typically limited by carbon levels. Therefore, adding a readily available source of carbon allows the bacteria to simultaneously take up a greater portion of nitrogen (contributing to better water quality) as well as generate biomass that then serves as food for the cultured animals.

The species of fish and crustaceans must be carefully chosen for the BFT system to realize its full potential.

== History ==
The first BFT was developed in the 1970s at Ifremer-COP (French Research Institute for Exploitation of the Sea, Oceanic Center of Pacific) with Penaeus monodon, Fenneropenaeus merguiensis, Litopenaeus vannamei, and L. stylirostris. Israel and USA (Waddell Mariculture Center) also started Research and Development with Tilapia and L. vannamei in the late 1980s and 1990s.

Commercial application started in 1988 at a farm in Tahiti (French Polynesia) using 1000m^{2} concrete tanks with limited water exchange, achieving a record of 20–25 tons/ha/year in 2 crops. A farm located in Belize, Central America also produced around 11-26 tons/ha/cycle using 1.6 ha poly-lined ponds. Another farm located in Maryland, USA also produced 45-ton shrimp per year using ~570 m^{3} indoor greenhouse BFT race-ways. BFT has been successfully practiced in large-scale shrimp and finfish farms in Asia, Latin, and Central America, the USA, South Korea, Brazil, Italy, China, India, and others. However, research on BFT by Universities and research centers is refining BFT for farm application in grow-out culture, feeding technology, reproduction, microbiology, biotechnology, and economics.

== The role of microorganisms ==
Microorganisms play a vital role in feeding and maintaining the overall health of cultured animals. The flocs of bacteria (biofloc) are a nutrient-rich source of proteins and lipids, providing food for the fish throughout the day. The water column shows a complex interaction between living microbes, planktons, organic matter, substrates, and grazers, such as rotifers, ciliates, protozoa and copepods which serves as a secondary source of food. The combination of these particulate matters keeps the recycling of nutrients and maintains the water quality.

The consumption of floc by cultured organisms has proven to increase the immunity and growth rate, decrease feed conversion ratio, and reduce the overall cost of production. The growth promotional factors have been attributed to both bacteria and plankton, where up to 30% of the total food is compensated in shrimp.

== Species compatibility ==
In BFT, there is a species compatibility norm for culturing. To improve growth performance, the candidate species must be resistant to high stocking density; Population density, adjust to fluctuations in dissolved oxygen (3–6 mg/L), settling solids (10–15 mL/L) and total ammonia compounds, and have omnivorous habits or the ability to consume microbial protein.
