= Aquaculture in Samoa =

Aquaculture in Samoa is hampered because of the limited number of sizable freshwater bodies in the country, although numerous aquaculture projects are underway. There have been several attempts to introduce tilapia cultivation, however these have generally been unsuccessful due to flooding as well as the difficulty of catching adult tilapia. The Samoa National Aquaculture Workshop, a workshop intended to develop a national industry plan by seeking out partnerships with stakeholders, convened in December 2004.
