= Certification for Aquaculture Professionals =

Program at Auburn University

CAP Logo

The Certification for Aquaculture Professionals (CAP) is an online program developed by the Auburn University Department of Fisheries and Allied Aquaculture, located in Auburn, Alabama, to teach aquaculture techniques and skills to a wide spectrum of professionals from government extension workers and industrial aquaculture to individual fish farmers. CAP is an online course that is accessible anywhere there is access to the internet. The course contains 10 modules that were developed and taught by professors who are leading experts in their fields. The certification gained upon completion of the course sets a standard and consistent level of education within the aquaculture community.

== Course description ==
The CAP program currently has 10 modules covering the Principles of Aquaculture, Water Quality, Aquatic Physiology, Fish Hatchery Management, Animal Nutrition, Strain Selection and Genetic Manipulation, Animal Health, Aquaculture Production, Extension Methods and Aquaculture Economics. The course covers production of catfish, tilapia, shrimp and mussels. Modules are revised and updated to reflect current market trends and new technology. While all 10 modules must be completed for the certification, it is possible to implement individual modules for education of specific needs. Currently a module on Mariculture is being developed.

Presently there are English and Spanish versions of CAP with French and Portuguese versions planned in the future. Each segment of the course contains close captioning to facilitate learning styles and clarity of the material presented.

A community web site has been developed for graduates of the CAP program to provide access to continued education in the latest developments in aquaculture, blogs to ask questions of other professionals and disseminate techniques being used in the field and access to the Auburn experts for specific questions.

== History ==
The CAP program is the brainchild of Dr. David B. Rouse and Dr. Antonio Garza. The concept of the program was developed while trying to create a professional standard of education and skills needed to be successful and profitable in the aquaculture industry. Once the concept was developed, Troy Hahn, the Information Technology (IT) for Special Projects for the Fisheries and Allied Aquaculture Department, was enlisted into the program to develop the course into a fully online platform accessible anywhere in the world with access to the internet.

In 2008, Auburn University was using the Blackboard Learning System a Learning Management System (LMS) and CAP was designed to run on Blackboard. In 2011 Auburn University decided to migrate to the CANVAS LMS produced by Instructure. The design of CANVAS allowed the CAP program to migrate to the new LMS with no major changes to the structure of the program and many of the test question formats were expanded to utilize the available formats.

== Users ==
The first CAP formal training was performed in Puebla, Mexico in October 2010. Thirty-eight participants from state (SDR Puebla) and federal (CESAPUE) agencies as well as aquaculture producers in Mexico participated in the Beta run of the program. The results were better than expected.

In the summer of 2011, the CAP program was used in conjunction with the Collaborative Research Support Program (CRSP) to train African extension workers at Auburn University's North Station. Participants from Kenya, Ghana, Tanzania and Uganda were supported by the CRSP project funding. Participants from Ghana and Mexico joined the program with personal funding. The combined CRSP and CAP training consisted of learning aquaculture techniques by hands on training for part of the day and then spending the rest of the day learning by using the CAP program.

In September, 2010, the Aquaculture Health Committee of the State of Michoacán in Mexico started formal CAP program training for all of their aquaculture technicians. There has been interest from most of the state Aquaculture Health Committees in Mexico towards certifying their technicians after CAP was presented at the National Aquaculture Health meeting coordinated by SENASICA August, 2011.

Currently, the CAP program is coordinating with the University of Cantabria (UC), Spain to develop an MBA in Aquaculture. This program will be half online (CAP) and half intensive business training in Santander, Spain. The MBA program will target all people involved with aquaculture management and marketing.

CAP is also working with the Mexican National Commission of Aquaculture and Fisheries (CONAPESCA) in collaboration with FIRA to certify 300 federal extension agents by 2014.

Several universities in Latin America and Africa have shown interest in updating their professors through CAP. The Marine Technical University of Tamaulipas (UTMART) will be the first to pilot this program.

In October 2011, the CAP program was presented to the Ecuadorian Aquaculturist with the support of the National Chamber of Aquaculture in Guayaquil (CAN), Ecuador. Interest in CAP has been shown by professional Aquaculturists in Guatemala, El Salvador, Honduras, Panama, Brazil, Argentina, Lebanon, the United Arab Emirates, Ethiopia, Malawi, Congo, India and Vietnam.
