= National Aquaculture Act of 1980 =

- Other short titles: National Aquaculture Act of 1979
- Long title: An Act to provide for the development of aquaculture in the United States, and for other purposes.
- Enacted by: the 96th United States Congress
- Effective: September 26, 1980

Citations
- Public law: 96-362
- Statutes at Large: 94 Stat. 1198

Codification
- Titles amended: 16 U.S.C.: Conservation
- U.S.C. sections created: 16 U.S.C. ch. 48 § 2801

Legislative history
- Introduced in the Senate as S. 1650 by Daniel K. Inouye (D-HI) on August 2, 1979; Committee consideration by Senate Agriculture, Nutrition, and Forestry, Senate Commerce, Science, and Transportation; Passed the Senate on April 30, 1980 (passed/agreed); Passed the House on September 8, 1980 (passed/agreed, in lieu of H.R. 20); Signed into law by President Jimmy Carter on September 26, 1980

The National Aquaculture Act of 1980 (P.L. 96-362, as amended) is intended to promote and support the development of private aquaculture and to ensure coordination among the various federal agencies that have aquaculture programs and policies. It provided for a national aquaculture policy, including a formal National Aquaculture Development Plan; established a Joint Subcommittee on Aquaculture on which officials of USDA, Commerce, the Interior, and nine other federal agencies sit; designated USDA as the lead agency for coordination; and authorized the National Aquaculture Information Center within the National Agricultural Library.

The S. 1650 legislation was passed by the 96th U.S. Congressional session and signed into law by the 39th President of the United States Jimmy Carter on September 26, 1980.
