= Joint Subcommittee on Aquaculture =

The Joint Subcommittee on Aquaculture (JSA), created by the National Aquaculture Act of 1980 (P.L. 96-362, Sec. 6; 16 USC 2805), has served as a federal interagency coordinating group to increase the overall effectiveness and productivity of federal aquaculture research, transfer, and assistance programs.

The JSA's Working Group on Quality Assurance in Aquaculture Production is co-chaired by representatives from the Food and Drug Administration’s Center for Veterinary Medicine (FDA-CVM) and USDA's Cooperative State Research, Education and Extension Service (USDA-CSREES). This working group serves as an open national public-private sector forum on issues associated with new animal drug approvals, biologics, licensing, producer quality assurance programs, international harmonization, etc.
