= Aquaculture =

Farming of aquatic organisms

Aquaculture farmed fish production

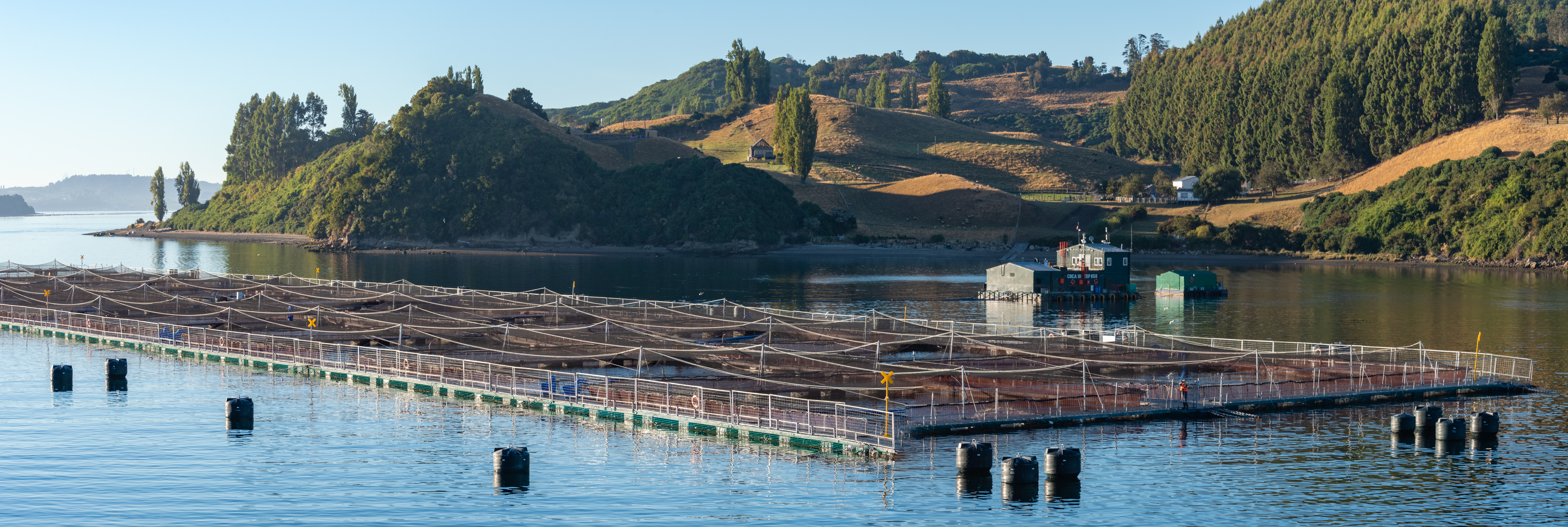
Aquaculture fish farming in the fjords south of Castro, Chile

Aquaculture (less commonly spelled aquiculture), also known as aquafarming, is the controlled cultivation ("farming") of aquatic organisms such as fish, crustaceans, mollusks, algae and other organisms of value such as aquatic plants (e.g. lotus). Aquaculture involves cultivating freshwater, brackish water, and saltwater populations under controlled or semi-natural conditions and can be contrasted with commercial fishing, which is the harvesting of wild fish. Aquaculture is also a practice used for restoring and rehabilitating marine and freshwater ecosystems. Mariculture, commonly known as marine farming, is aquaculture in seawater habitats and lagoons, as opposed to freshwater aquaculture. Pisciculture is a type of aquaculture that consists of fish farming to obtain fish products as food.

Aquaculture can also be defined as the breeding, growing, and harvesting of fish and other aquatic plants, also known as farming in water. It is an environmental source of food and commercial products that help to improve healthier habitats and are used to reconstruct the population of endangered aquatic species. Technology has increased the growth of fish in coastal marine waters and open oceans due to the increased demand for seafood.

Aquaculture can be conducted in completely artificial facilities built on land (onshore aquaculture), as in the case of fish tank, ponds, aquaponics or raceways, where the living conditions rely on human control such as water quality (oxygen), feed or temperature. Alternatively, they can be conducted on well-sheltered shallow waters nearshore of a body of water (inshore aquaculture), where the cultivated species are subjected to relatively more naturalistic environments; or on fenced/enclosed sections of open water away from the shore (offshore aquaculture), where the species are either cultured in cages, racks or bags and are exposed to more diverse natural conditions such as water currents (such as ocean currents), diel vertical migration and nutrient cycles.

According to the Food and Agriculture Organization (FAO), aquaculture "is understood to mean the farming of aquatic organisms including fish, molluscs, crustaceans and aquatic plants. Farming implies some form of intervention in the rearing process to enhance production, such as regular stocking, feeding, protection from predators, etc. Farming also implies individual or corporate ownership of the stock being cultivated." The reported output from global aquaculture operations in 2019 was over 120 million tonnes valued at US$274 billion, by 2022, it had risen to 130.9 million tonnes, valued at USD 312.8 billion. However, there are issues with the reliability of the reported figures. Further, in current aquaculture practice, products from several kilograms of wild fish are used to produce one kilogram of a piscivorous fish like salmon. Plant and insect-based feeds are also being developed to help reduce wild fish being used for aquaculture feed.

Particular kinds of aquaculture include fish farming, shrimp farming, oyster farming, mariculture, pisciculture, algaculture (such as seaweed farming), and the cultivation of ornamental fish. Particular methods include aquaponics and integrated multi-trophic aquaculture, both of which integrate fish farming and aquatic plant farming. The FAO describes aquaculture as one of the industries most directly affected by climate change and its impacts. Some forms of aquaculture have negative impacts on the environment, such as through nutrient pollution or disease transfer to wild populations.

== Overview ==
Global capture fisheries and aquaculture production reported by FAO, 1990–2030

World aquaculture production of food fish and aquatic plants, 1990–2016

Harvest stagnation in wild fisheries and overexploitation of popular marine species, combined with a growing demand for high-quality protein, encouraged aquaculturists to domesticate other marine species. At the outset of modern aquaculture, many were optimistic that a "Blue Revolution" could take place in aquaculture, just as the Green Revolution of the 20th century had revolutionized agriculture. Although land animals had long been domesticated, most seafood species were still caught from the wild. Concerned about the impact of growing demand for seafood on the world's oceans, prominent ocean explorer Jacques Cousteau wrote in 1973: "With earth's burgeoning human populations to feed, we must turn to the sea with new understanding and new technology."

About 430 (97%) of the species cultured as of 2007 were domesticated during the 20th and 21st centuries, of which an estimated 106 came in the decade to 2007. Given the long-term importance of agriculture, to date, only 0.08% of known land plant species and 0.0002% of known land animal species have been domesticated, compared with 0.17% of known marine plant species and 0.13% of known marine animal species. Domestication typically involves about a decade of scientific research. Domesticating aquatic species involves fewer risks to humans than do land animals, which took a large toll in human lives. Most major human diseases originated in domesticated animals, including diseases such as smallpox and diphtheria, that like most infectious diseases, move to humans from animals. No human pathogens of comparable virulence have yet emerged from marine species.

In 2024 aquaculture production was concentrated in Asia which accounted for around 89% of global aquatic animal aquaculture production, followed by Latin America and the Caribbean (3%), Europe (2%), Africa (2%), Northern America (0.4%) and Oceania (0.2%). The top five countries together produced 82% of the total output; China, Indonesia, India, Viet Nam and Bangladesh. Freshwater systems dominate aquaculture production of aquatic animals, accounting for 64 million tonnes (63%), compared to 38 million tonnes (37%) from marine and coastal systems.

Biological control methods to manage parasites are already being used, such as cleaner fish (e.g. lumpsuckers and wrasse) to control sea lice populations in salmon farming. Models are being used to help with spatial planning and siting of fish farms in order to minimize impact.

Aquaculture production (2023)

The decline in wild fish stocks has increased the demand for farmed fish. However, finding alternative sources of protein and oil for fish feed is necessary so the aquaculture industry can grow sustainably; otherwise, it represents a great risk for the over-exploitation of forage fish.

Aquaculture production now exceeds capture fishery production and together the relative GDP contribution has ranged from 0.01 to 10%. Singling out aquaculture's relative contribution to GDP, however, is not easily derived due to lack of data.

Another recent issue following the banning in 2008 of organotins by the International Maritime Organization is the need to find environmentally friendly, but still effective, compounds with antifouling effects.

Many new natural compounds are discovered every year, but producing them on a large enough scale for commercial purposes is almost impossible.

It is highly probable that future developments in this field will rely on microorganisms, but greater funding and further research is needed to overcome the lack of knowledge in this field.

== Species groups ==
Global aquaculture production in million tonnes, 1950–2010, as reported by the FAO

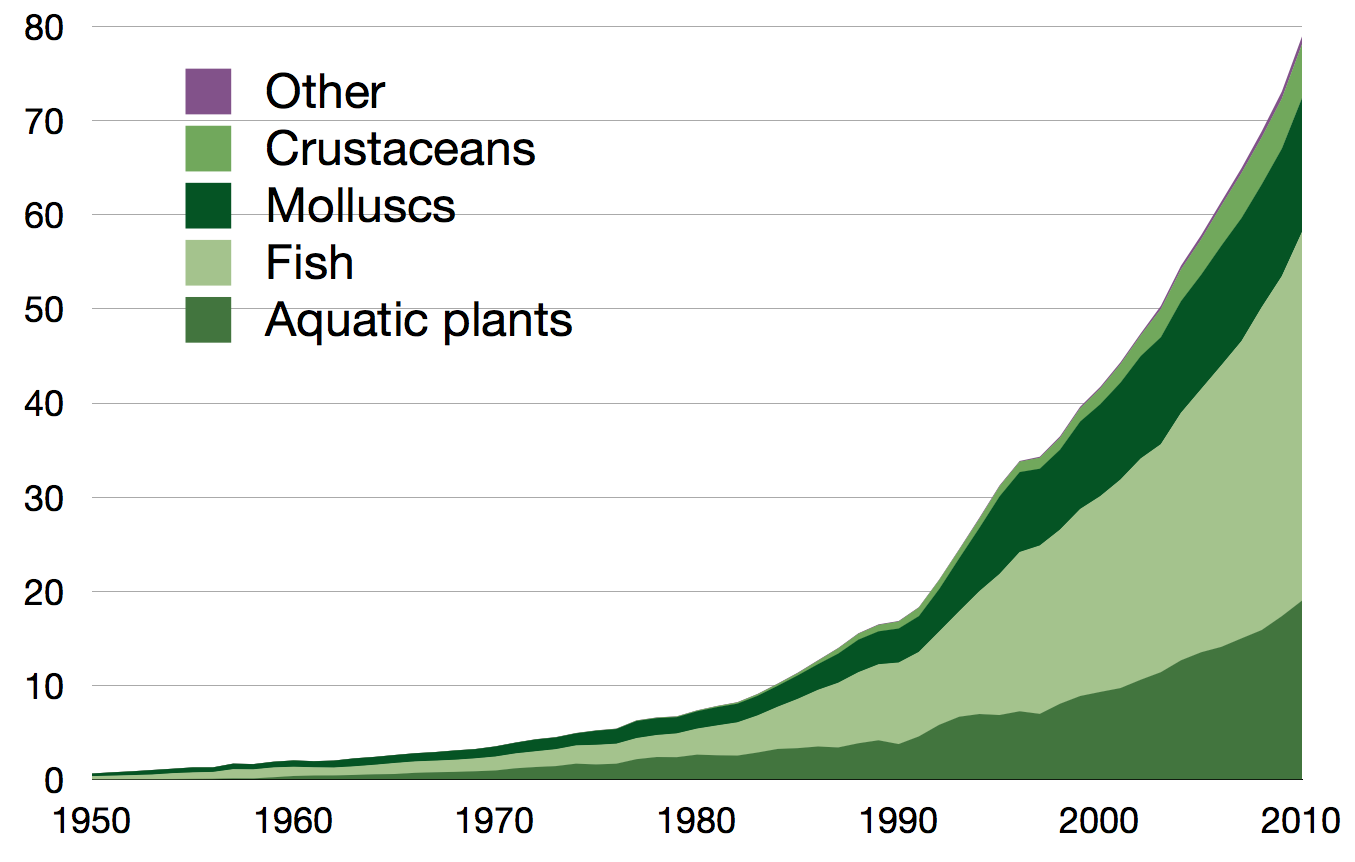
Main species groups

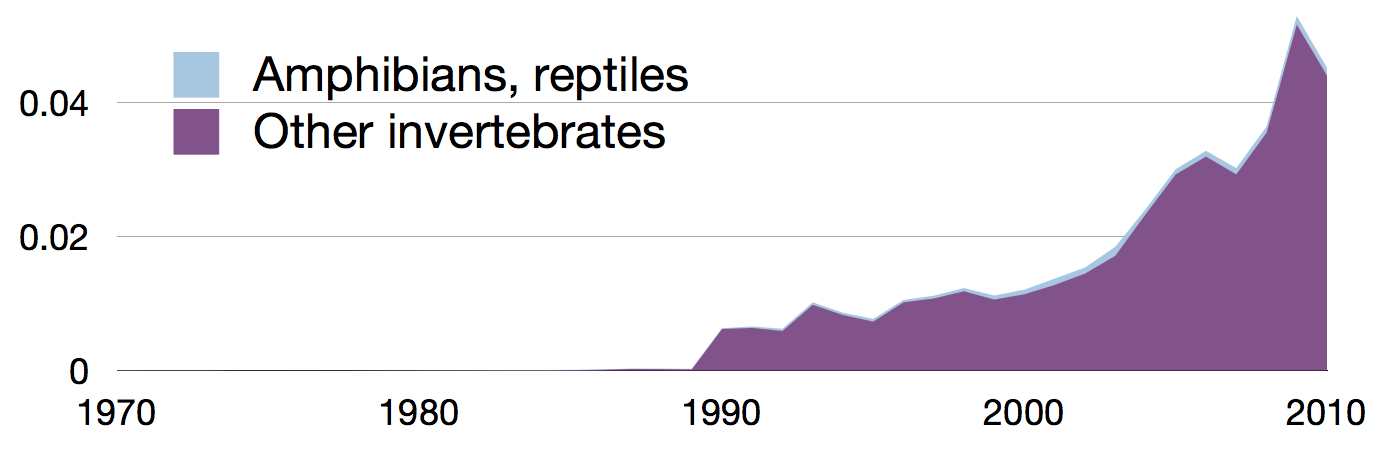
Minor species groups

World capture fisheries and aquaculture production by main producers (2018), from FAO's Statistical Yearbook 2020

=== Aquatic plants ===
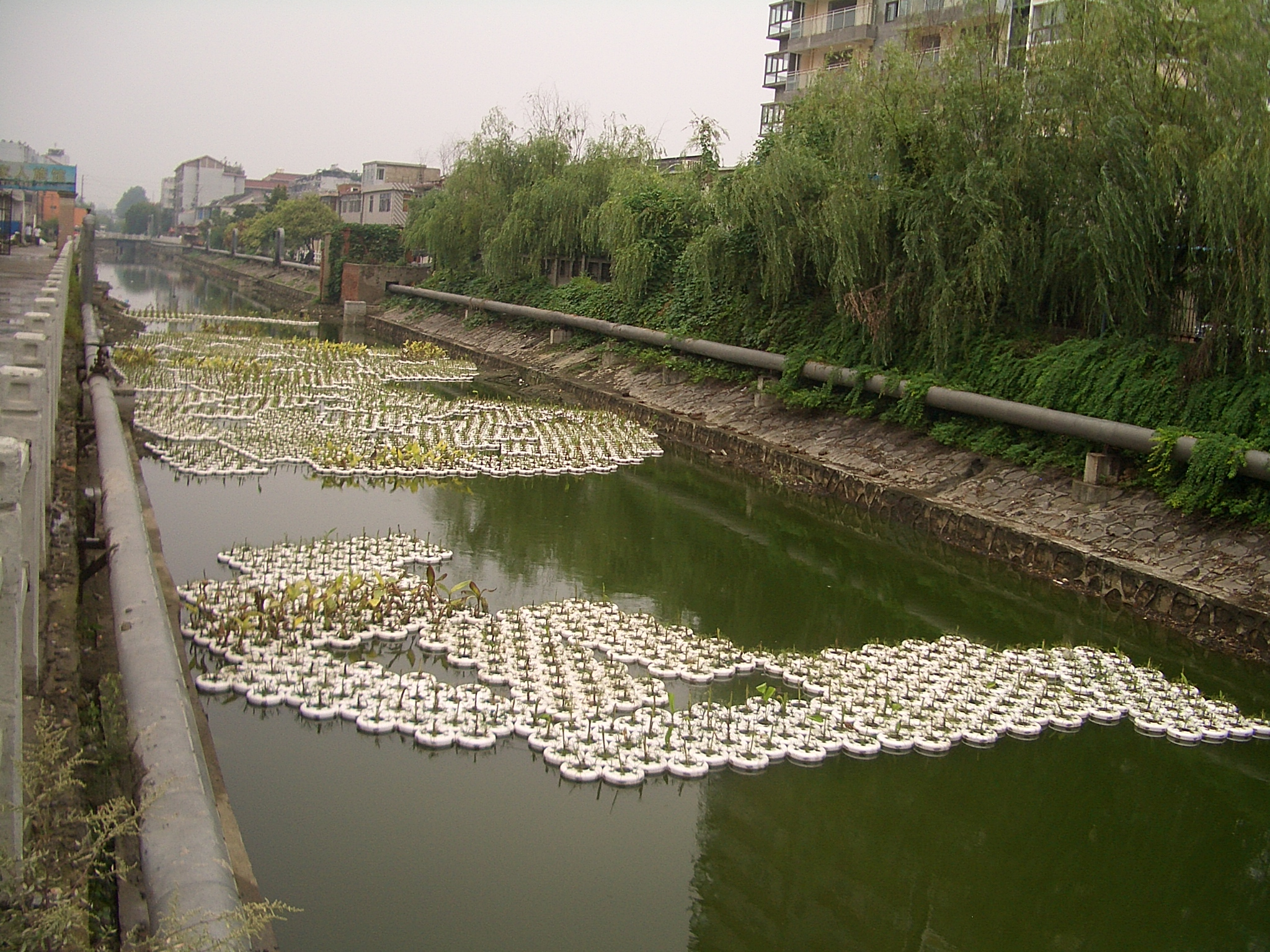
Cultivating emergent aquatic plants in floating containers

Microalgae, also referred to as phytoplankton, microphytes, or planktonic algae, constitute the majority of cultivated algae. Macroalgae commonly known as seaweed also have many commercial and industrial uses, but due to their size and specific requirements, they are not easily cultivated on a large scale and are most often taken in the wild.

In 2016, aquaculture was the source of 96.5 percent by volume of the total 31.2 million tonnes of wild-collected and cultivated aquatic plants combined. Global production of farmed aquatic plants, overwhelmingly dominated by seaweeds, grew in output volume from 13.5 million tonnes in 1995 to just over 30 million tonnes in 2016.

==== Seaweed farming ====
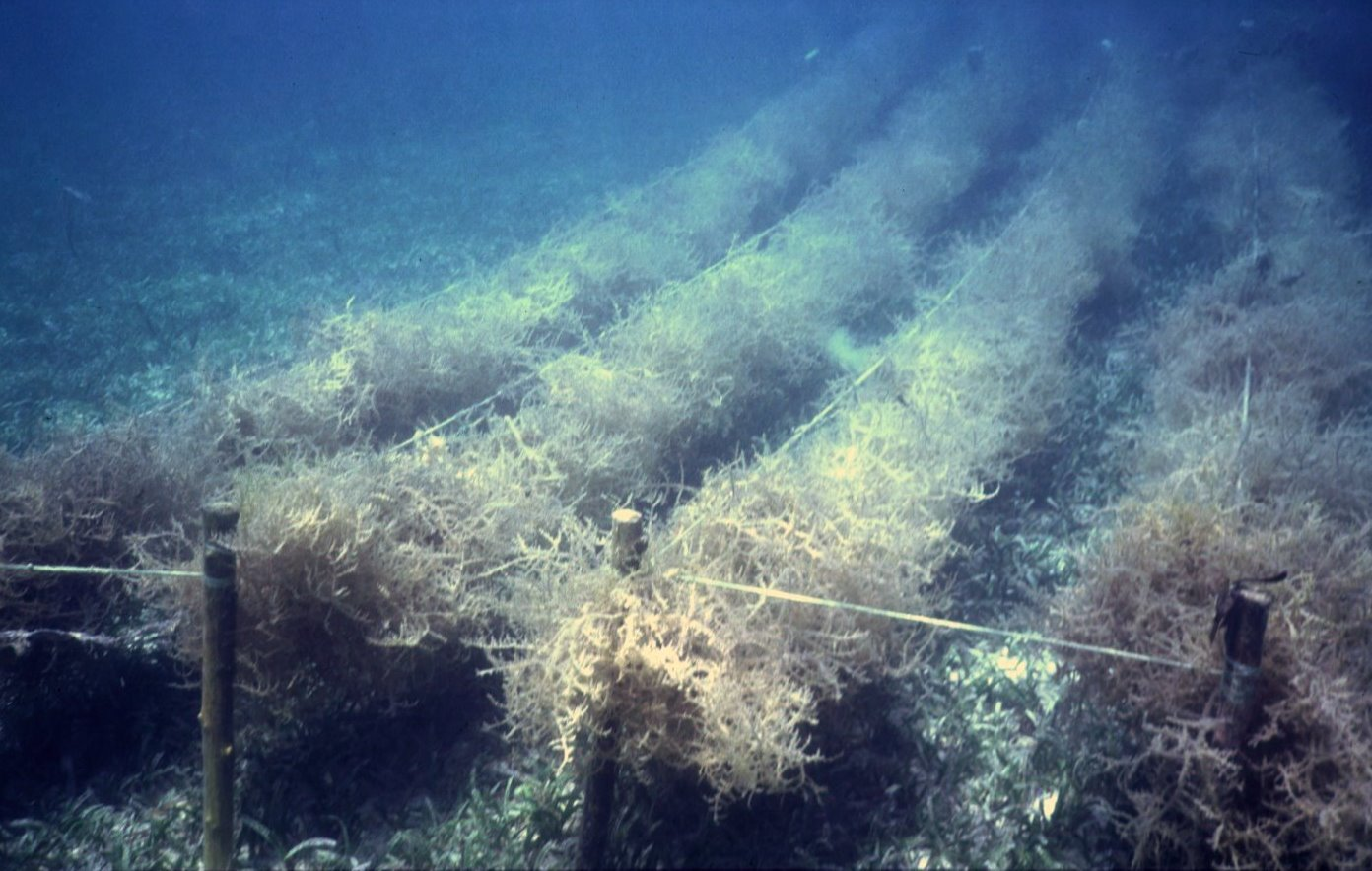
Underwater Eucheuma farming in the Philippines

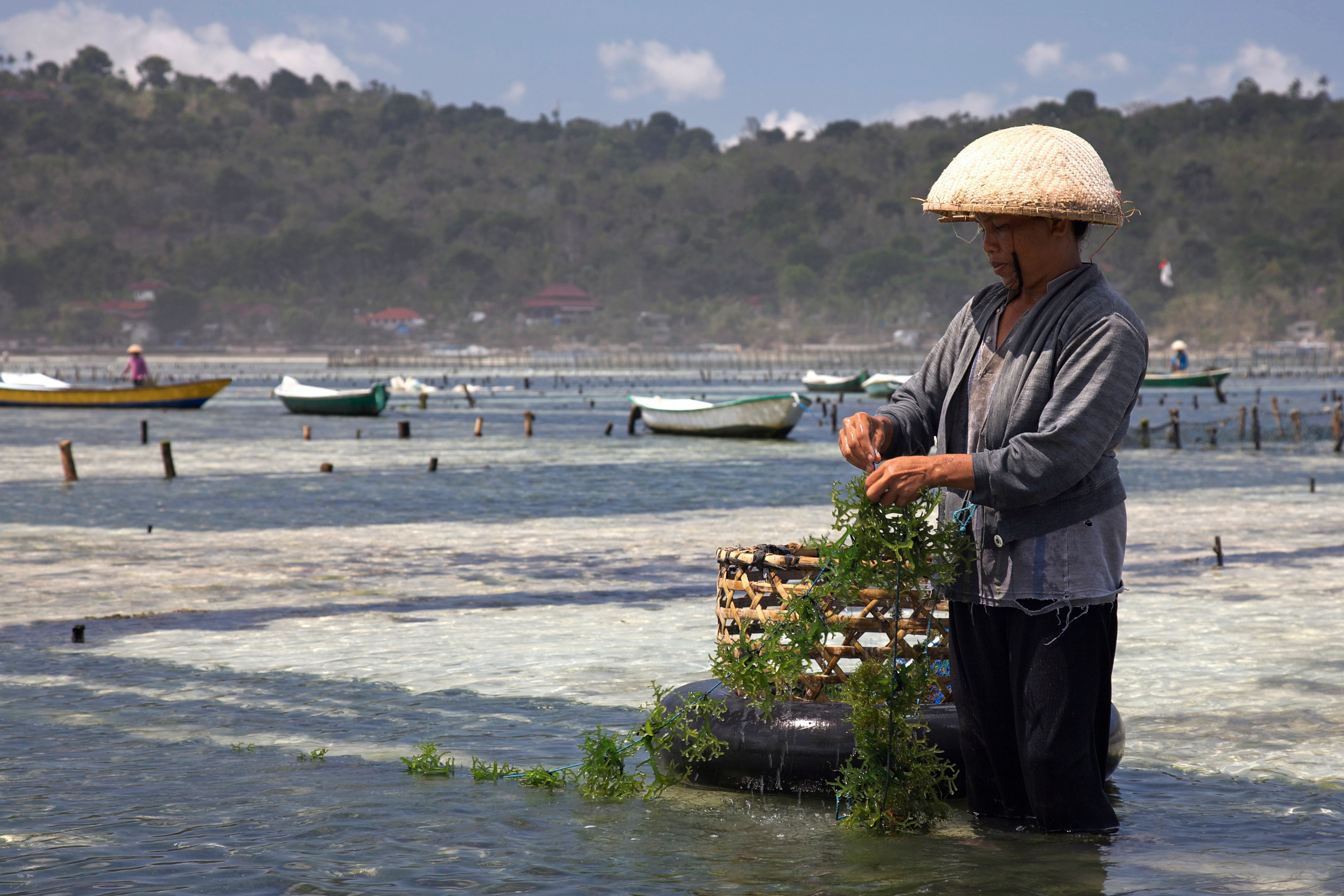
A seaweed farmer in Nusa Lembongan (Indonesia) gathers edible seaweed that has grown on a rope.

Seaweed farming or kelp farming is the practice of cultivating and harvesting seaweed. In its simplest form farmers gather from natural beds, while at the other extreme farmers fully control the crop's life cycle.

The seven most cultivated taxa are Eucheuma spp., Kappaphycus alvarezii, Gracilaria spp., Saccharina japonica, Undaria pinnatifida, Pyropia spp., and Sargassum fusiforme. Eucheuma and K. alvarezii are attractive for carrageenan (a gelling agent); Gracilaria is farmed for agar; the rest are eaten after limited processing. Seaweeds are different from mangroves and seagrasses, as they are photosynthetic algal organisms and are non-flowering.

The largest seaweed-producing countries as of 2022 are China (58.62%) and Indonesia (28.6%); followed by South Korea (5.09%) and the Philippines (4.19%). Other notable producers include North Korea (1.6%), Japan (1.15%), Malaysia (0.53%), Zanzibar (Tanzania, 0.5%), and Chile (0.3%). Seaweed farming has frequently been developed to improve economic conditions and to reduce fishing pressure.

The Food and Agriculture Organization (FAO) reported that world production in 2019 was over 35 million tonnes. North America produced some 23,000 tonnes of wet seaweed. Alaska, Maine, France, and Norway each more than doubled their seaweed production since 2018. As of 2019, seaweed represented 30% of marine aquaculture. In 2023, the global seaweed extract market was valued at $16.5 billion, with strong projected growth.

Seaweed farming is a carbon negative crop, with a high potential for climate change mitigation. The IPCC Special Report on the Ocean and Cryosphere in a Changing Climate recommends "further research attention" as a mitigation tactic. World Wildlife Fund, Oceans 2050, and The Nature Conservancy publicly support expanded seaweed cultivation.

=== Fish ===
The farming of fish is the most common form of aquaculture. It involves raising fish commercially in tanks, fish ponds, or ocean enclosures, usually for food. A facility that releases juvenile fish into the wild for recreational fishing or to supplement a species' natural numbers is generally referred to as a fish hatchery. Worldwide, the most important fish species used in fish farming are, in order, carp, salmon, tilapia, and catfish.

In the Mediterranean, young bluefin tuna are netted at sea and towed slowly towards the shore. They are then interned in offshore pens (sometimes made from floating HDPE pipe) where they are further grown for the market. In 2009, researchers in Australia managed for the first time to coax southern bluefin tuna to breed in landlocked tanks. Southern bluefin tuna are also caught in the wild and fattened in grow-out sea cages in southern Spencer Gulf, South Australia.

A similar process is used in the salmon-farming section of this industry; juveniles are taken from hatcheries and a variety of methods are used to aid them in their maturation. For example, as stated above, some of the most important fish species in the industry, salmon, can be grown using a cage system. This is done by having netted cages, preferably in open water that has a strong flow, and feeding the salmon a special food mixture that aids their growth. This process allows for year-round growth of the fish, thus a higher harvest during the correct seasons. An additional method, known sometimes as sea ranching, has also been used within the industry. Sea ranching involves raising fish in a hatchery for a brief time and then releasing them into marine waters for further development, whereupon the fish are recaptured when they have matured.

=== Crustaceans ===
Commercial shrimp farming began in the 1970s, and production grew steeply thereafter. Global production reached more than 1.6 million tonnes in 2003, worth about US$9 billion. About 75% of farmed shrimp is produced in Asia, in particular in China and Thailand. The other 25% is produced mainly in Latin America, where Brazil is the largest producer. Thailand is the largest exporter.

Shrimp farming has changed from its traditional, small-scale form in Southeast Asia into a global industry. Technological advances have led to ever higher densities per unit area, and broodstock is shipped worldwide. Virtually all farmed shrimp are penaeids (i.e., shrimp of the family Penaeidae), and just two species of shrimp, the Pacific white shrimp and the giant tiger prawn, account for about 80% of all farmed shrimp. These industrial monocultures are very susceptible to disease, which has decimated shrimp populations across entire regions. Increasing ecological problems, repeated disease outbreaks, and pressure and criticism from both nongovernmental organizations and consumer countries led to changes in the industry in the late 1990s and generally stronger regulations. In 1999, governments, industry representatives, and environmental organizations initiated a program aimed at developing and promoting more sustainable farming practices through the Seafood Watch program.

Freshwater prawn farming shares many characteristics with, including many problems with, marine shrimp farming. Unique problems are introduced by the developmental lifecycle of the main species, the giant river prawn.

The global annual production of freshwater prawns (excluding crayfish and crabs) in 2007 was about 460,000 tonnes, exceeding 1.86 billion dollars. Additionally, China produced about 370,000 tonnes of Chinese river crab.

In addition astaciculture is the freshwater farming of crayfish (mostly in the US, Australia, and Europe).

=== Molluscs ===
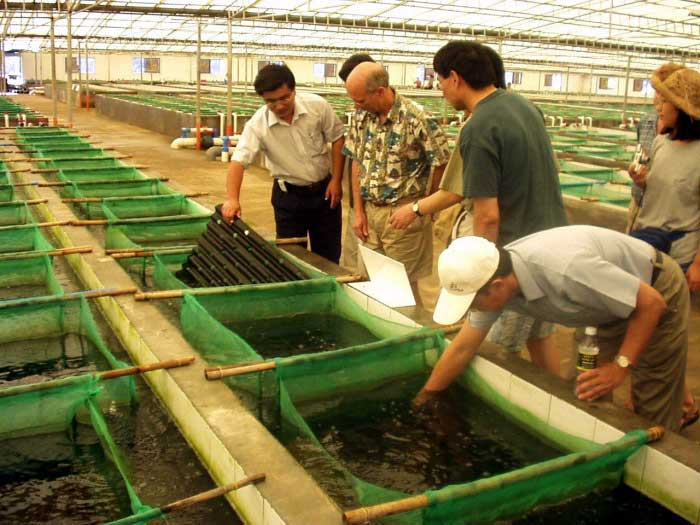
Abalone farm

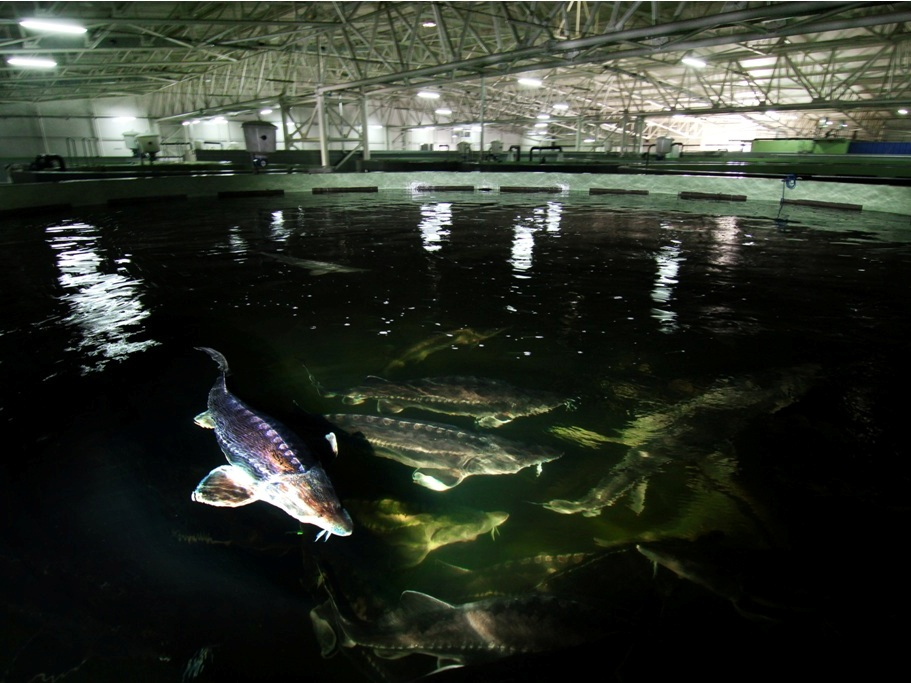
Sturgeon farm

Aquacultured shellfish include various oyster, mussel, and clam species. These bivalves are filter and/or deposit feeders, which rely on ambient primary production rather than inputs of fish or other feed. As such, shellfish aquaculture is generally perceived as benign or even beneficial.

Depending on the species and local conditions, bivalve molluscs are either grown on the beach, on longlines, or suspended from rafts and harvested by hand or by dredging. In May 2017 a Belgian consortium installed the first of two trial mussel farms on a wind farm in the North Sea.

Abalone farming began in the late 1950s and early 1960s in Japan and China. Since the mid-1990s, this industry has become increasingly successful. Overfishing and poaching have reduced wild populations to the extent that farmed abalone now supplies most abalone meat. Sustainably farmed molluscs can be certified by Seafood Watch and other organizations, including the World Wildlife Fund (WWF). WWF initiated the "Aquaculture Dialogues" in 2004 to develop measurable and performance-based standards for responsibly farmed seafood. In 2009, WWF co-founded the Aquaculture Stewardship Council with the Dutch Sustainable Trade Initiative to manage the global standards and certification programs.

After trials in 2012, a commercial "sea ranch" was set up in Flinders Bay, Western Australia, to raise abalone. The ranch is based on an artificial reef made up of 5000 (As of April 2016) separate concrete units called abitats (abalone habitats). The 900 kg abitats can host 400 abalone each. The reef is seeded with young abalone from an onshore hatchery. The abalone feed on seaweed that has grown naturally on the habitats, with the ecosystem enrichment of the bay also resulting in growing numbers of dhufish, pink snapper, wrasse, and Samson fish, among other species.

Brad Adams, from the company, has emphasised the similarity to wild abalone and the difference from shore-based aquaculture. "We're not aquaculture, we're ranching, because once they're in the water they look after themselves."

=== Other groups ===
Other groups include aquatic reptiles, amphibians, and miscellaneous invertebrates, such as echinoderms and jellyfish. They are separately graphed at the top right of this section, since they do not contribute enough volume to show clearly on the main graph.

Commercially harvested echinoderms include sea cucumbers and sea urchins. In China, sea cucumbers are farmed in artificial ponds as large as 400 hectares (1,000 acres).

== Global fish production ==
World capture fisheries and aquaculture production

By species group

By main producers (2023)

Aquaculture production of selected main species groups by major producer, 2010 - 2024

Fed and non-fed aquaculture production of animal species by region, 2000 - 2024

Share of aquaculture in total fisheries and aquaculture production of aquatic animals in region, 2000 - 2024

World aquaculture production, 1990 - 2024

Global fish production peaked at about 171 million tonnes in 2016, with aquaculture representing 47 percent of the total and 53 percent if non-food uses (including reduction to fishmeal and fish oil) are excluded. With capture fishery production relatively static since the late 1980s, aquaculture has been responsible for the continuing growth in the supply of fish for human consumption. Global aquaculture production (including aquatic plants) in 2016 was 110.2 million tonnes, with the first-sale value estimated at US$244 billion. Three years later, in 2019 the reported output from global aquaculture operations was over 120 million tonnes valued at US$274 billion and by 2022 it had reached 130.9 million tonnes, valued at USD 312.8 billion. For the first time, aquaculture surpassed capture fisheries in aquatic animal production with 94.4 million tonnes, representing 51 percent of the world total and a record 57 percent of the production destined for human consumption. In 2024 aquaculture produced 103 million tonnes of aquatic animals, an all-time record, equivalent to 53% ofglobal aquatic animal output, and over 59% of aquatic animal foods for human consumption.

In 2022 most aquaculture workers were in Asia (95%), followed by Africa (3%) and Latin America and the Caribbean (2%).

The contribution of aquaculture to the global production of capture fisheries and aquaculture combined has risen continuously, reaching 46.8 percent in 2016, up from 25.7 percent in 2000. With 5.8 percent annual growth rate during the period 2001–2016, aquaculture continues to grow faster than other major food production sectors, but it no longer has the high annual growth rates experienced in the 1980s and 1990s.

In 2012, the total world production of fisheries was 158 million tonnes, of which aquaculture contributed 66.6 million tonnes, about 42%. The growth rate of worldwide aquaculture has been sustained and rapid, averaging about 8% per year for over 30 years, while the take from wild fisheries has been essentially flat for the last decade. The aquaculture market reached $86 billion in 2009.

Aquaculture is an especially important economic activity in China. Between 1980 and 1997, the Chinese Bureau of Fisheries reports, aquaculture harvests grew at an annual rate of 16.7%, jumping from 1.9 million tonnes to nearly 23 million tonnes. In 2005, China accounted for 70% of world production. Aquaculture is also currently one of the fastest-growing areas of food production in the U.S.

About 90% of all U.S. shrimp consumption is farmed and imported. In recent years, salmon aquaculture has become a major export in southern Chile, especially in Puerto Montt, Chile's fastest-growing city.

A United Nations report titled The State of the World Fisheries and Aquaculture released in May 2014 maintained fisheries and aquaculture support the livelihoods of some 60 million people in Asia and Africa. FAO estimates that in 2016, overall, women accounted for nearly 14 percent of all people directly engaged in the fisheries and aquaculture primary sector.

In 2021, global fish production reached 182 million tonnes, with approximately equal amounts coming from capture (91.2 million tonnes) and aquaculture (90.9 million tonnes). Aquaculture has experienced rapid growth in recent decades, increasing almost sevenfold from 1990 to 2021.

Category	2011	2012	2013	2014	2015	2016
Production						
Capture						
Inland	10.7	11.2	11.2	11.3	11.4	11.6
Marine	81.5	78.4	79.4	79.9	81.2	79.3
Total capture	92.2	89.5	90.6	91.2	92.7	90.9
Aquaculture						
Inland	38.6	42	44.8	46.9	48.6	51.4
Marine	23.2	24.4	25.4	26.8	27.5	28.7
Total aquaculture	61.8	66.4	70.2	73.7	76.1	80
Total world fisheries and aquaculture	154	156	160.7	164.9	168.7	170.9
Utilization						
Human consumption	130	136.4	140.1	144.8	148.4	151.2
Non-food uses	24	19.6	20.6	20	20.3	19.7
Population (billions)	7	7.1	7.2	7.3	7.3	7.4
Per capita apparent consumption (kg)	18.5	19.2	19.5	19.9	20.2	20.3

Aquaculture production by region

=== Over-reporting by China ===
China overwhelmingly dominates the world in reported aquaculture output, reporting a total output which is double that of the rest of the world put together. However, there are some historical issues with the accuracy of China's returns.

In 2001, scientists Reg Watson and Daniel Pauly expressed concerns that China was over reporting its catch from wild fisheries in the 1990s. They said that made it appear that the global catch since 1988 was increasing annually by 300,000 tonnes, whereas it was really shrinking annually by 350,000 tonnes. Watson and Pauly suggested this may have been related to Chinese policies where state entities that monitored the economy were also tasked with increasing output. Also, until more recently, the promotion of Chinese officials was based on production increases from their own areas.

China disputed this claim. The official Xinhua News Agency quoted Yang Jian, director general of the Agriculture Ministry's Bureau of Fisheries, as saying that China's figures were "basically correct". However, the FAO accepted there were issues with the reliability of China's statistical returns, and for a period treated data from China, including the aquaculture data, apart from the rest of the world.

== Aquacultural methods ==
=== Mariculture ===
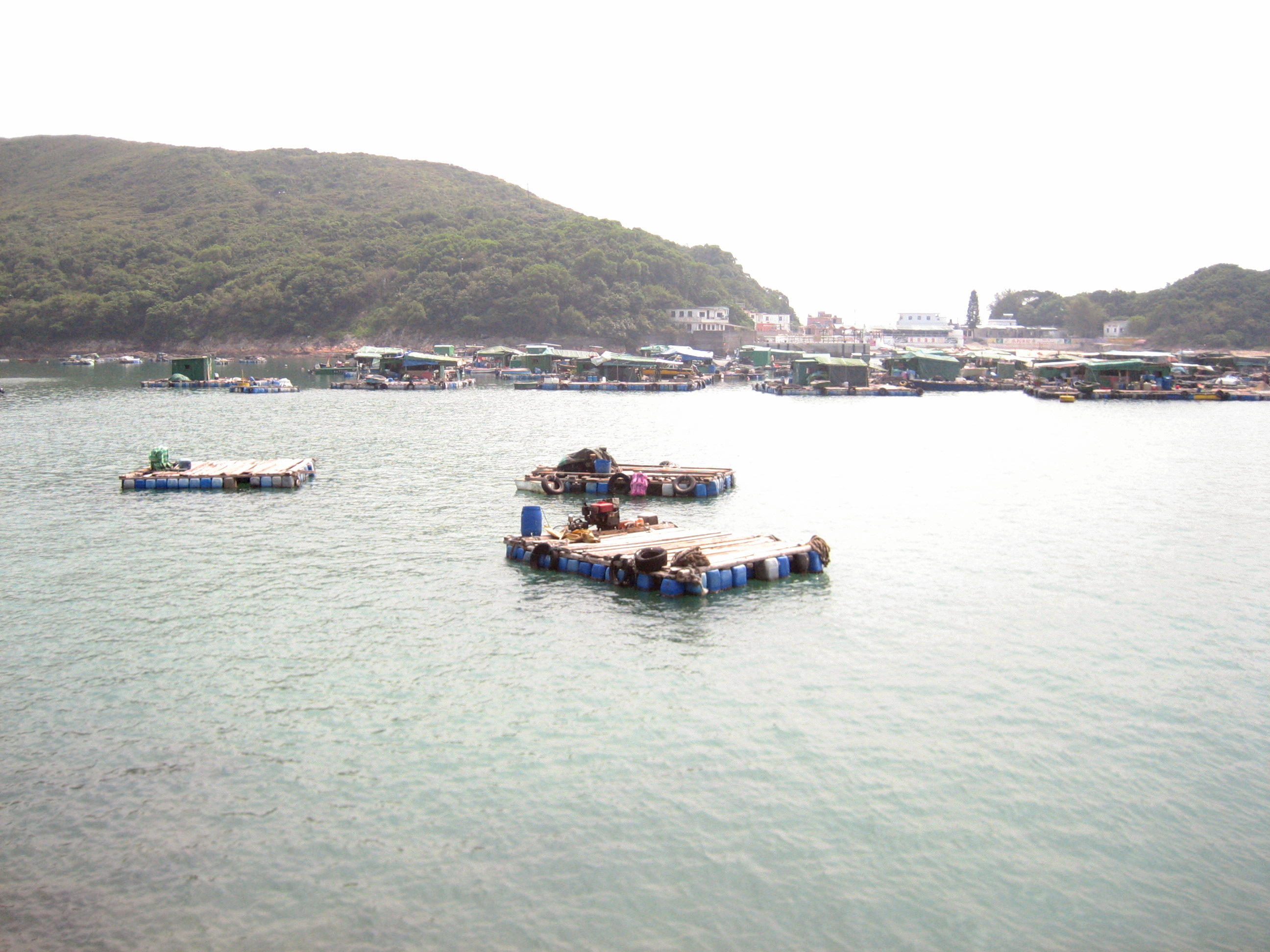
Finfish mariculture off High Island, Hong Kong

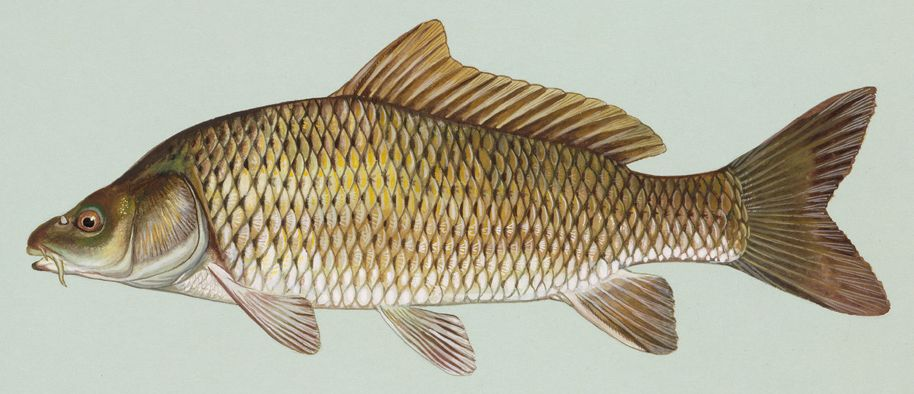
Carp are one of the dominant fishes in freshwater aquaculture.

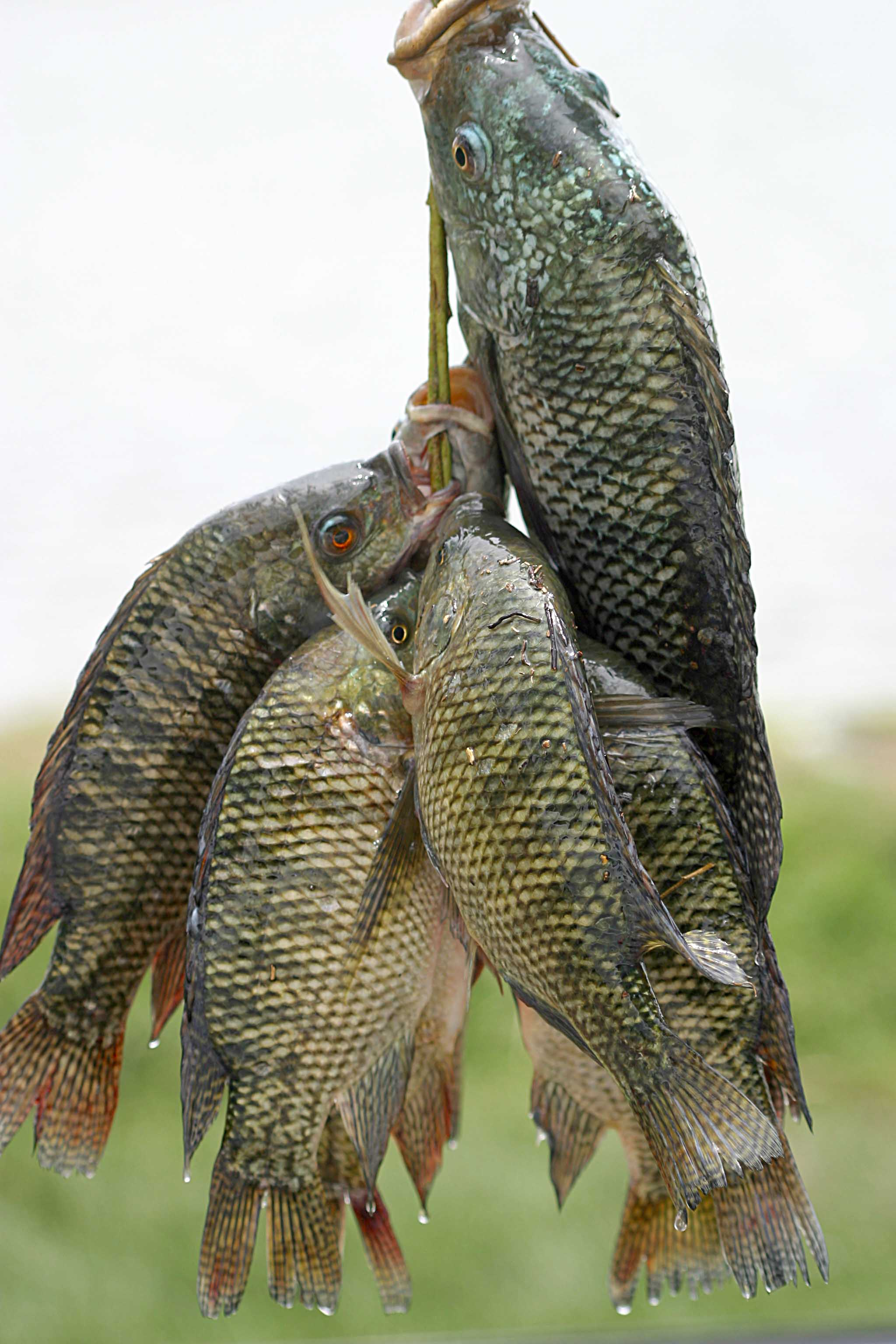
The adaptable tilapia is another commonly farmed freshwater fish

Mariculture is the cultivation of marine organisms in seawater, variously in sheltered coastal waters ("inshore"), open ocean ("offshore"), and on land ("onshore"). Farmed species include algae (from microalgae (such as phytoplankton) to macroalgae (such as seaweed); shellfish (such as shrimp), lobster, oysters), and clams, and marine finfish. Channel catfish (Ictalurus punctatus), hard clams (Mercenaria mercenaria) and Atlantic salmon (Salmo salar) are prominent in the U.S. mariculture.

Mariculture may consist of raising the organisms on or in artificial enclosures such as in floating netted enclosures for salmon, and on racks or in floating cages for oysters. In the case of enclosed salmon, they are fed by the operators; oysters on racks filter feed on naturally available food. Abalone have been farmed on an artificial reef consuming seaweed which grows naturally on the reef units.

=== Integrated ===
Integrated multi-trophic aquaculture (IMTA) is a practice in which the byproducts (wastes) from one species are recycled to become inputs (fertilizers, food) for another. Fed aquaculture (for example, fish, shrimp) is combined with inorganic extractive and organic extractive (for example, shellfish) aquaculture to create balanced systems for environmental sustainability (biomitigation), economic stability (product diversification and risk reduction) and social acceptability (better management practices).

"Multi-trophic" refers to the incorporation of species from different trophic or nutritional levels in the same system. This is one potential distinction from the age-old practice of aquatic polyculture, which could simply be the co-culture of different fish species from the same trophic level. In this case, these organisms may all share the same biological and chemical processes, with few synergistic benefits, which could potentially lead to significant shifts in the ecosystem. Some traditional polyculture systems may, in fact, incorporate a greater diversity of species, occupying several niches, as extensive cultures (low intensity, low management) within the same pond. A working IMTA system can result in greater total production based on mutual benefits to the co-cultured species and improved ecosystem health, even if the production of individual species is lower than in a monoculture over a short-term period.

Sometimes the term "integrated aquaculture" is used to describe the integration of monocultures through water transfer. For all intents and purposes, the terms "IMTA" and "integrated aquaculture" differ only in their degree of descriptiveness. Aquaponics, fractionated aquaculture, integrated agriculture-aquaculture systems, integrated peri-urban-aquaculture systems, and integrated fisheries-aquaculture systems are other variations of the IMTA concept.

=== Urban aquaculture ===
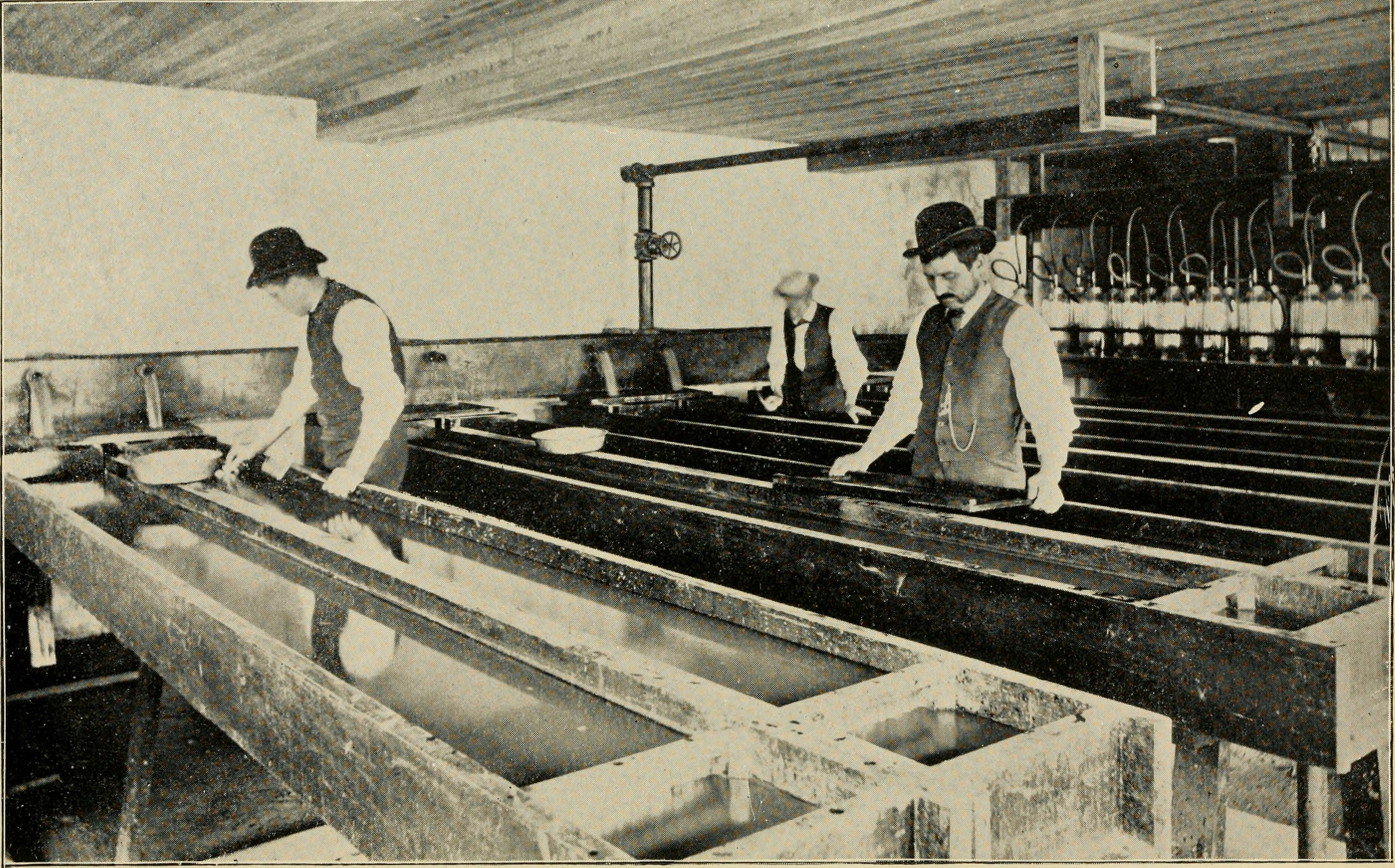
Artificial propagation of the Atlantic salmon, rainbow trout, and brook trout (circa 1900)

Urban aquaculture is aquaculture of fish, shellfish, and marine plants in rivers, ponds, lakes, canals located within an urban environment. Urban aquaculture systems can be associated with a multitude of different production locations, species used, environment, and production intensity. The use of urban aquaculture has increased over the last several years as societies continue to urbanise and demand for food in urban environments increases. Methods of production include recirculating systems; land-based culture systems; multifunctional wetlands; ponds, borrow pits and lakes; cages and culture-based fisheries. Most production in urban environments will include either extensive (productivity is based solely on natural runoff) or intensive (tanks and cages of monoculture production), compared to aquaculture in general, which is normally semi-intensive.

== Netting materials ==
Various materials, including nylon, polyester, polypropylene, polyethylene, plastic-coated welded wire, rubber, patented rope products (Spectra, Thorn-D, Dyneema), galvanized steel and copper are used for netting in aquaculture fish enclosures around the world. All of these materials are selected for a variety of reasons, including design feasibility, material strength, cost, and corrosion resistance.

Recently, copper alloys have become important netting materials in aquaculture because they are antimicrobial (i.e., they destroy bacteria, viruses, fungi, algae, and other microbes) and they therefore prevent biofouling (i.e., the undesirable accumulation, adhesion, and growth of microorganisms, plants, algae, tubeworms, barnacles, mollusks, and other organisms). By inhibiting microbial growth, copper alloy aquaculture cages avoid costly net changes that are necessary with other materials. The resistance of organism growth on copper alloy nets also provides a cleaner and healthier environment for farmed fish to grow and thrive.

== Technology ==
Uncrewed vessels, like ROVs and AUVs, are now being used in aquaculture in various ways, such as site planning, cage or net inspection, environmental monitoring, disaster assessment, and risk reduction. The use of uncrewed vessels aims to increase safety, efficiency, and accuracy of aquaculture operations. Aquaculture is a multi-million-dollar business that relies on net and cage maintenance. Inspections used to be conducted by divers manually inspecting the nets, but uncrewed vessels are now being used to conduct faster and more efficient inspections.

Recent advances in computer vision have further improved automated monitoring, with vision-language models capable of identifying and classifying multiple fish species in underwater environments using temporally aggregated features.

Biofloc technology is also used to simultaneously improve water quality and generate bacterial biomass as food for the cultured animals.

== Issues ==
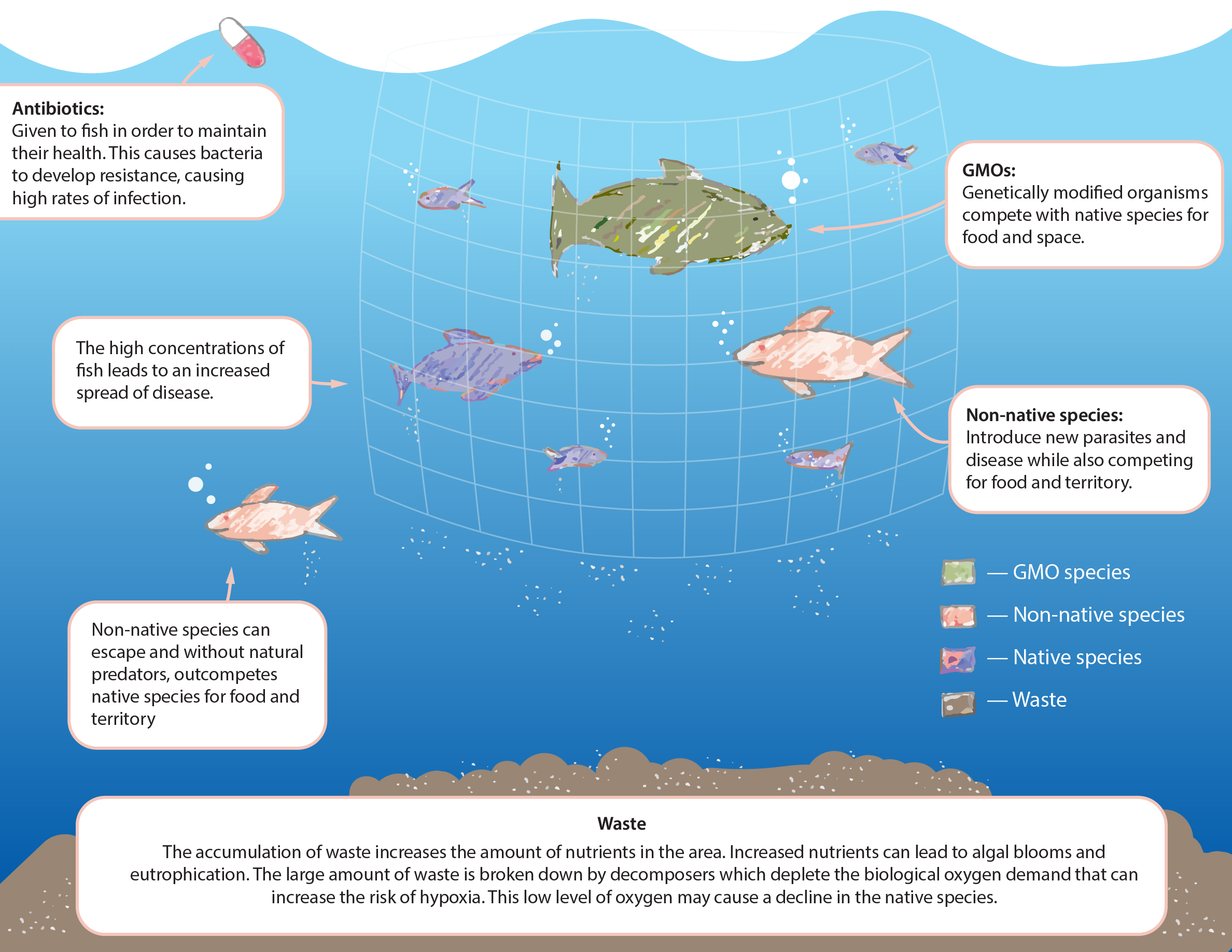

If performed without consideration for potential local environmental impacts, aquaculture in inland waters can result in more environmental damage than wild fisheries, though with less waste produced per kg on a global scale. Local concerns with aquaculture in inland waters may include waste handling, side-effects of antibiotics, competition between farmed and wild animals, and the potential introduction of invasive plant and animal species, or foreign pathogens, particularly if unprocessed fish are used to feed more marketable carnivorous fish. If non-local live feeds are used, aquaculture may introduce exotic plants or animals with disastrous effects. Improvements in methods resulting from advances in research and the availability of commercial feeds has reduced some of these concerns since their greater prevalence in the 1990s and 2000s .

Fish waste is organic and composed of nutrients necessary in all components of aquatic food webs. In-ocean aquaculture often produces much higher than normal fish waste concentrations. The waste collects on the ocean bottom, damaging or eliminating bottom-dwelling life. Waste can also decrease dissolved oxygen levels in the water column, putting further pressure on wild animals. An alternative model to food being added to the ecosystem, is the installation of artificial reef structures to increase the habitat niches available, without the need to add any more than ambient feed and nutrient. This has been used in the "ranching" of abalone in Western Australia.

=== Impacts on wild fish ===
Some carnivorous and omnivorous farmed fish species are fed wild forage fish. Although carnivorous farmed fish represented only 13 percent of aquaculture production by weight in 2000, they represented 34 percent of aquaculture production by value.

Farming of carnivorous species like salmon and shrimp leads to a high demand for forage fish to match the nutrition they get in the wild. Fish do not actually produce omega-3 fatty acids, but instead accumulate them from either consuming microalgae that produce these fatty acids, as is the case with forage fish like herring and sardines, or, as is the case with fatty predatory fish, like salmon, by eating prey fish that have accumulated omega-3 fatty acids from microalgae. To satisfy this requirement, more than 50 percent of the world fish oil production is fed to farmed salmon.

Farmed salmon consume more wild fish than they generate as a final product, although the efficiency of production is improving. To produce one kilograms of farmed salmon, products from several kilograms of wild fish are fed to them – this can be described as the "fish-in-fish-out" (FIFO) ratio. In 1995, salmon had a FIFO ratio of 7.5 (meaning 7.5 kilograms of wild fish feed were required to produce one kilogram of salmon); by 2006 the ratio had fallen to 4.9. Additionally, a growing share of fish oil and fishmeal come from residues (byproducts of fish processing), rather than dedicated whole fish. In 2012, 34 percent of fish oil and 28 percent of fishmeal came from residues. Fishmeal and oil from residues instead of whole fish have a different composition with more ash and less protein, which may limit its potential use for aquaculture.

As the salmon farming industry expands, it requires more wild forage fish for feed, at a time when seventy-five percent of the world's monitored fisheries are already near to or have exceeded their maximum sustainable yield. The industrial-scale extraction of wild forage fish for salmon farming then impacts the survivability of the wild predator fish who rely on them for food. An important step in reducing the impact of aquaculture on wild fish is shifting carnivorous species to plant-based feeds. Salmon feeds, for example, have gone from containing only fishmeal and oil to containing 40 percent plant protein. The USDA has also experimented with using grain-based feeds for farmed trout. When properly formulated (and often mixed with fishmeal or oil), plant-based feeds can provide proper nutrition and similar growth rates in carnivorous farmed fish.

Another impact aquaculture production can have on wild fish is the risk of fish escaping from coastal pens, where they can interbreed with their wild counterparts, diluting wild genetic stocks. Escaped fish can become invasive, out-competing native species.

=== Animal welfare ===
As with the farming of terrestrial animals, social attitudes influence the need for humane practices and regulations in farmed marine animals. Under the guidelines advised by the Farm Animal Welfare Council good animal welfare means both fitness and a sense of well-being in the animal's physical and mental state. This can be defined by the Five Freedoms:

- Freedom from hunger and thirst
- Freedom from discomfort
- Freedom from pain, disease, or injury
- Freedom to express normal behaviour
- Freedom from fear and distress

The controversial issue in aquaculture is whether fish and farmed marine invertebrates are actually sentient, or have the perception and awareness to experience suffering. Although no evidence of this has been found in marine invertebrates, recent studies conclude that fish do have the necessary receptors (nociceptors) to sense noxious stimuli and so are likely to experience states of pain, fear and stress. Consequently, welfare in aquaculture is directed at vertebrates, finfish in particular.

==== Common welfare concerns ====
Welfare in aquaculture can be impacted by a number of issues such as stocking densities, behavioural interactions, disease and parasitism. A major problem in determining the cause of impaired welfare is that these issues are often all interrelated and influence each other at different times.

Optimal stocking density is often defined by the carrying capacity of the stocked environment and the amount of individual space needed by the fish, which is very species specific. Although behavioural interactions such as shoaling may mean that high stocking densities are beneficial to some species, in many cultured species high stocking densities may be of concern. Crowding can constrain normal swimming behaviour, as well as increase aggressive and competitive behaviours such as cannibalism, feed competition, territoriality and dominance/subordination hierarchies. This potentially increases the risk of tissue damage due to abrasion from fish-to-fish contact or fish-to-cage contact. Fish can suffer reductions in food intake and food conversion efficiency. In addition, high stocking densities can result in water flow being insufficient, creating inadequate oxygen supply and waste product removal. Dissolved oxygen is essential for fish respiration and concentrations below critical levels can induce stress and even lead to asphyxiation. Ammonia, a nitrogen excretion product, is highly toxic to fish at accumulated levels, particularly when oxygen concentrations are low.

Many of these interactions and effects cause stress in the fish, which can be a major factor in facilitating fish disease. For many parasites, infestation depends on the host's degree of mobility, the density of the host population and vulnerability of the host's defence system. Sea lice are the primary parasitic problem for finfish in aquaculture, high numbers causing widespread skin erosion and haemorrhaging, gill congestion, and increased mucus production. There are also a number of prominent viral and bacterial pathogens that can have severe effects on internal organs and nervous systems.

==== Improving welfare ====
The key to improving welfare of marine cultured organisms is to reduce stress to a minimum, as prolonged or repeated stress can cause a range of adverse effects. Attempts to minimise stress can occur throughout the culture process. Understanding and providing required environmental enrichment can be vital for reducing stress and benefit aquaculture objects such as improved growth body condition and reduced damage from aggression. During grow-out it is important to keep stocking densities at appropriate levels specific to each species, as well as separating size classes and grading to reduce aggressive behavioural interactions. Keeping nets and cages clean can assist positive water flow to reduce the risk of water degradation.

Not surprisingly disease and parasitism can have a major effect on fish welfare and it is important for farmers not only to manage infected stock but also to apply disease prevention measures. Prevention methods, such as vaccination, can also induce stress because of the extra handling and injection. Other methods include adding antibiotics to feed, adding chemicals into water for treatment baths and biological control, such as using cleaner wrasse to remove lice from farmed salmon.

Many steps are involved in transport, including capture, food deprivation to reduce faecal contamination of transport water, transfer to transport vehicle via nets or pumps, plus transport and transfer to the delivery location. During transport water needs to be maintained to a high quality, with regulated temperature, sufficient oxygen and minimal waste products. In some cases anaesthetics may be used in small doses to calm fish before transport.

Aquaculture is sometimes part of an environmental rehabilitation program or as an aid in conserving endangered species.

=== Coastal ecosystems ===
Aquaculture is becoming a significant threat to coastal ecosystems. About 20 percent of mangrove forests have been destroyed since 1980, partly due to shrimp farming. An extended cost–benefit analysis of the total economic value of shrimp aquaculture built on mangrove ecosystems found that the external costs were much higher than the external benefits. Over four decades, 269,000 hectares (660,000 acres) of Indonesian mangroves have been converted to shrimp farms. Most of these farms are abandoned within a decade because of the toxin build-up and nutrient loss.

==== Pollution from sea cage aquaculture ====
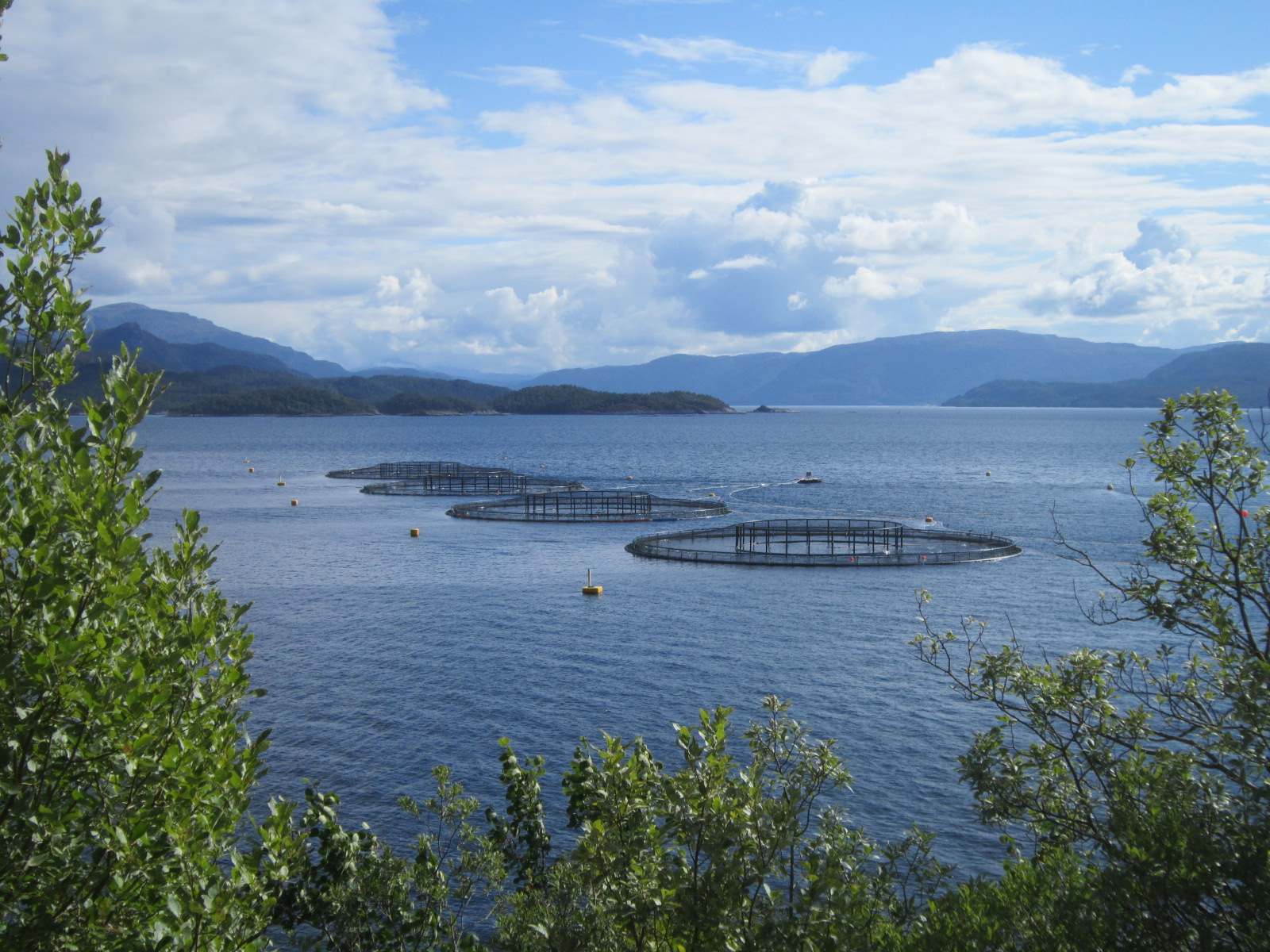
Salmon aquaculture, Norway

Salmon farms are typically sited in pristine coastal ecosystems which they then pollute. A farm with 200,000 salmon discharges more fecal waste than a city of 60,000 people. This waste is discharged directly into the surrounding aquatic environment, untreated, often containing antibiotics and pesticides." There is also an accumulation of heavy metals on the benthos (seafloor) near the salmon farms, particularly copper and zinc.

In 2016, mass fish kill events impacted salmon farmers along Chile's coast and the wider ecology. Increases in aquaculture production and its associated effluent were considered to be possible contributing factors to fish and molluscan mortality.

Sea cage aquaculture is responsible for nutrient enrichment of the waters in which they are established. This results from fish wastes and uneaten feed inputs. Elements of most concern are nitrogen and phosphorus which can promote algal growth, including harmful algal blooms which can be toxic to fish. Flushing times, current speeds, distance from the shore and water depth are important considerations when locating sea cages in order to minimize the impacts of nutrient enrichment on coastal ecosystems.

The extent of the effects of pollution from sea-cage aquaculture varies depending on where the cages are located, which species are kept, how densely cages are stocked and what the fish are fed. Important species-specific variables include the species' food conversion ratio (FCR) and nitrogen retention.

=== Freshwater ecosystems ===
Whole-lake experiments carried out at the Experimental Lakes Area in Ontario, Canada, have displayed the potential for cage aquaculture to source numerous changes in freshwater ecosystems. Following the initiation of an experimental rainbow trout cage farm in a small boreal lake, dramatic reductions in mysis concentrations associated with a decrease in dissolved oxygen were observed. Significant increases in ammonium and total phosphorus, a driver for eutrophication in freshwater systems, were measured in the hypolimnion of the lake. Annual phosphorus inputs from aquaculture waste exceeded that of natural inputs from atmospheric deposition and inflows, and phytoplankton biomass has had a fourfold annual increase following the initiation of the experimental farm.

=== Genetic modification ===
A type of salmon called the AquAdvantage salmon has been genetically modified for faster growth, although it has not been approved for commercial use, due to controversy. The altered salmon incorporates a growth hormone from a Chinook salmon that allows it to reach full size in 16–28 months, instead of the normal 36 months for Atlantic salmon, and while consuming 25 percent less feed. The U.S. Food and Drug Administration reviewed the AquAdvantage salmon in a draft environmental assessment and determined that it "would not have a significant impact (FONSI) on the U.S. environment."

=== Fish diseases, parasites and vaccines ===
A major difficulty for aquaculture is the tendency towards monoculture and the associated risk of widespread disease. Aquaculture is also associated with environmental risks; for instance, shrimp farming has caused the destruction of important mangrove forests throughout southeast Asia.

In the 1990s, disease wiped out China's farmed Farrer's scallop and white shrimp and required their replacement by other species.

==== Needs of the aquaculture sector in vaccines ====
Aquaculture has an average annual growth rate of 9.2%, however, the success and continued expansion of the fish farming sector is highly dependent on the control of fish pathogens including a wide range of viruses, bacteria, fungi, and parasites. In 2014, it was estimated that these parasites cost the global salmon farming industry up to 400 million Euros. This represents 6–10% of the production value of the affected countries, but it can go up to 20% (Fisheries and Oceans Canada, 2014). Since pathogens quickly spread within a population of cultured fish, their control is vital for the sector. Historically, the use of antibiotics was against bacterial epizootics but the production of animal proteins has to be sustainable, which means that preventive measures that are acceptable from a biological and environmental point of view should be used to keep disease problems in aquaculture at an acceptable level. So, this added to the efficiency of vaccines resulted in an immediate and permanent reduction in the use of antibiotics in the 90s. In the beginning, there were fish immersion vaccines efficient against the vibriosis but proved ineffective against the furunculosis, hence the arrival of injectable vaccines: first water-based and after oil-based, much more efficient (Sommerset, 2005).

==== Development of new vaccines ====
It is the important mortality in cages among farmed fish, the debates around DNA injection vaccines, although effective, their safety and their side effects but also societal expectations for cleaner fish and security, lead research on new vaccine vectors. Several initiatives are financed by the European Union to develop a rapid and cost-effective approach to using bacteria in feed to make vaccines, in particular thanks to lactic bacteria whose DNA is modified (Boudinot, 2006). In fact, vaccinating farmed fish by injection is time-consuming and costly, so vaccines can be administered orally or by immersion by being added to feed or directly into water. This allows vaccinating many individuals at the same time while limiting the associated handling and stress. Indeed, many tests are necessary because the antigens of the vaccines must be adapted to each species or not present a certain level of variability or they will not have any effect. For example, tests have been done with two species: Lepeophtheirus salmonis (from which the antigens were collected) and Caligus rogercresseyi (which was vaccinated with the antigens), although the homology between the two species is important, the level of variability made the protection ineffective (Fisheries and Oceans Canada, 2014).

==== Recent vaccines development in aquaculture ====
There are 24 vaccines available and one for lobsters. The first vaccine was used in the USA against enteric red mouth in 1976. However, there are 19 companies and some small stakeholders are producing vaccines for aquaculture nowadays. The novel approaches are a way forward to prevent the loss of 10% of aquaculture through disease. Genetically modified vaccines are not being used in the EU due to societal concerns and regulations. Meanwhile, DNA vaccines are now authorised in the EU. There are challenges in fish vaccine development, immune response due to lack of potent adjuvants. Scientists are considering microdose application in future. But there are also opportunities in aquaculture vaccinology due to the low cost of technology, regulations change and novel antigen expression and delivery systems. In Norway subunit vaccine (VP2 peptide) against infectious pancreatic necrosis is being used. In Canada, a licensed DNA vaccine against Infectious hematopoietic necrosis has been launched for industry use. Fish have large mucosal surfaces, so the preferred route is immersion, intraperitoneal and oral respectively. Nanoparticles are in progress for delivery purposes. The common antibodies produced are IgM and IgT. Normally booster is not required in fish because more memory cells are produced in response to the booster rather than an increased level of antibodies. mRNA vaccines are alternative to DNA vaccines because they are more safe, stable, easily producible at a large scale and mass immunization potential. Recently these are used in cancer prevention and therapeutics. Studies in rabies has shown that efficacy depends on dose and route of administration. These are still in infancy.

==== Economic gains ====
In 2014, the aquaculture produced fish overtook wild caught fish, in supply for human food. This means there is a huge demand for vaccines, in prevention of diseases. The reported annual loss fish, calculates to >10 billion USD. This is from approximately 10% of all fishes dying from infectious diseases. The high annual losses increases the demand for vaccines. Even though there are about 24 traditionally used vaccines, there is still demand for more vaccines. The breakthrough of DNA-vaccines has sunk the cost of vaccines.

The alternative to vaccines would be antibiotics and chemotherapy, which are more expensive and with bigger drawbacks. DNA-vaccines have become the most cost-efficient method of preventing infectious diseases. This bodes well for DNA-vaccines becoming the new standard both in fish vaccines, and in general vaccines.

=== Salinization/acidification of soils ===
Sediment from abandoned aquaculture farms can remain hypersaline, acidic and eroded. This material can remain unusable for aquaculture purposes for long periods thereafter. Various chemical treatments, such as adding lime, can aggravate the problem by modifying the physicochemical characteristics of the sediment.

=== Plastic pollution ===
Aquaculture produces a range of marine debris, depending on the product and location. The most frequently documented type of plastic is expanded polystyrene (EPS), used extensively in floats and sea cage collars (MEPC 2020). Other common waste items include cage nets and plastic harvest bins. A review of aquaculture as a source of marine litter in the North, Baltic and Mediterranean Seas identified 64 different items, 19 of which were unique to aquaculture. Estimates of the amount of aquaculture waste entering the oceans vary widely, depending on the methodologies used. For example, in the European Economic Area loss estimates have varied from a low of 3,000 tonnes to 41,000 tonnes per year.

== Ecological benefits ==
While some forms of aquaculture can be devastating to ecosystems, such as shrimp farming in mangroves, other forms can be beneficial. Shellfish aquaculture adds substantial filter feeding capacity to an environment which can significantly improve water quality. A single oyster can filter 15 gallons of water a day, removing microscopic algal cells. By removing these cells, shellfish are removing nitrogen and other nutrients from the system and either retaining it or releasing it as waste which sinks to the bottom. By harvesting these shellfish, the nitrogen they retained is completely removed from the system. Raising and harvesting kelp and other macroalgae directly remove nutrients such as nitrogen and phosphorus. Repackaging these nutrients can relieve eutrophic, or nutrient-rich, conditions known for their low dissolved oxygen which can decimate species diversity and abundance of marine life. Removing algal cells from the water also increases light penetration, allowing plants such as eelgrass to reestablish themselves and further increase oxygen levels.

Aquaculture in an area can provide for crucial ecological functions for the inhabitants. Shellfish beds or cages can provide habitat structure. This structure can be used as shelter by invertebrates, small fish or crustaceans to potentially increase their abundance and maintain biodiversity. Increased shelter raises stocks of prey fish and small crustaceans by increasing recruitment opportunities in turn providing more prey for higher trophic levels. One study estimated that 10 square meters of oyster reef could enhance an ecosystem's biomass by 2.57 kg Herbivore shellfish will also be preyed on. This moves energy directly from primary producers to higher trophic levels potentially skipping out on multiple energetically costly trophic jumps which would increase biomass in the ecosystem.

Seaweed farming is a carbon negative crop, with a high potential for climate change mitigation. The IPCC Special Report on the Ocean and Cryosphere in a Changing Climate recommends "further research attention" as a mitigation tactic. Regenerative ocean farming is a polyculture farming system that grows a mix of seaweeds and shellfish while sequestering carbon, decreasing nitrogen in the water and increasing oxygen, helping to regenerate and restore local habitat like reef ecosystems.

== Prospects ==
Global wild fisheries are in decline, with valuable habitat such as estuaries in critical condition. The aquaculture or farming of piscivorous fish, like salmon, does not help the problem because they need to eat products from other fish, such as fish meal and fish oil. Studies have shown that salmon farming has major negative impacts on wild salmon, as well as the forage fish that need to be caught to feed them. Fish that are higher on the food chain are less efficient sources of food energy.

Apart from fish and shrimp, some aquaculture undertakings, such as seaweed and filter-feeding bivalve molluscs like oysters, clams, mussels and scallops, are relatively benign and even environmentally restorative. Filter-feeders filter pollutants as well as nutrients from the water, improving water quality. Seaweeds extract nutrients such as inorganic nitrogen and phosphorus directly from the water, and filter-feeding mollusks can extract nutrients as they feed on particulates, such as phytoplankton and detritus.

Some profitable aquaculture cooperatives promote sustainable practices. New methods lessen the risk of biological and chemical pollution through minimizing fish stress, fallowing netpens, and applying integrated pest management. Vaccines are being used more and more to reduce antibiotic use for disease control.

Onshore recirculating aquaculture systems, facilities using polyculture techniques, and properly sited facilities (for example, offshore areas with strong currents) are examples of ways to manage negative environmental effects.

Recirculating aquaculture systems (RAS) recycle water by circulating it through filters to remove fish waste and food, and then recirculating it back into the tanks. This saves water, and the waste gathered can be used in compost or, in some cases, could even be treated and used on land. While RAS was developed with freshwater fish in mind, scientists associated with the Agricultural Research Service have found a way to rear saltwater fish using RAS in low-salinity waters. Although saltwater fish are raised in offshore cages or caught with nets in water that typically has a salinity of 35 parts per thousand (ppt), scientists were able to produce healthy pompano, a saltwater fish, in tanks with a salinity of only 5 ppt. Commercializing low-salinity RAS is predicted to have positive environmental and economic effects. Unwanted nutrients from the fish food would not be added to the ocean, and the risk of transmitting diseases between wild and farm-raised fish would be greatly reduced. The price of expensive saltwater fish, such as the pompano and cobia used in the experiments, would be reduced. However, before any of this can be done researchers must study every aspect of the fish's lifecycle, including the amount of ammonia and nitrate the fish will tolerate in the water, what to feed the fish during each stage of its lifecycle, the stocking rate that will produce the healthiest fish, etc.

Some 16 countries now use geothermal energy for aquaculture, including China, Israel, and the United States. In California, for example, 15 fish farms produce tilapia, bass, and catfish with warm water from underground. This warmer water enables fish to grow all year round and mature more quickly. Collectively, these California farms produce 4.5 million kilograms of fish annually.

=== Global goals ===
The UN Sustainable Development Goal 14 ("life below water"), Target 14.7 includes aquaculture: "By 2030, increase the economic benefits to small island developing states and least developed countries from the sustainable use of marine resources, including through sustainable management of fisheries, aquaculture and tourism". Aquaculture's contribution to GDP is not included in SDG Target 14.7, but methods for quantifying this have been explored by FAO.

== National laws, regulations, and management ==
Laws governing aquaculture practices vary greatly by country and are often not closely regulated or easily traceable.

In the United States, land-based and nearshore aquaculture is regulated at the federal and state levels; no national laws govern offshore aquaculture in U.S. exclusive economic zone waters. In June 2011, the Department of Commerce and National Oceanic and Atmospheric Administration released national aquaculture policies to address this issue and "to meet the growing demand for healthy seafood, to create jobs in coastal communities, and restore vital ecosystems." Large aquaculture facilities (i.e. those producing 20,000 pounds (9,100 kg) per year) which discharge wastewater are required to obtain permits pursuant to the Clean Water Act. Facilities that produce at least 100,000 pounds (45,000 kg) of fish, molluscs or crustaceans a year are subject to specific national discharge standards. Other permitted facilities are subject to effluent limitations that are developed on a case-by-case basis.

== By country ==
Aquaculture by Country:

== History ==
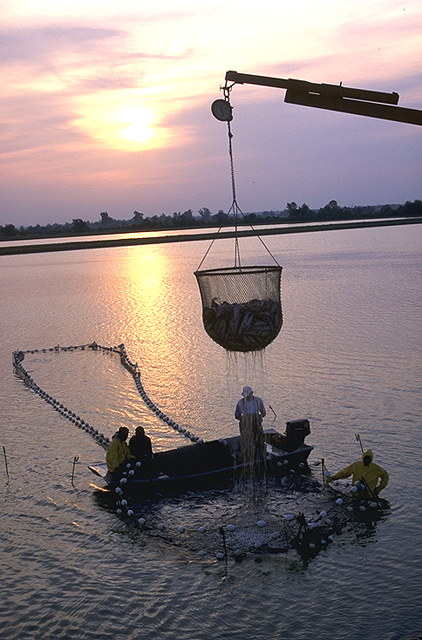
Workers harvest catfish from the Delta Pride Catfish farms in Mississippi

The Gunditjmara, a local Aboriginal Australian people in south-western Victoria, Australia, may have raised short-finned eels as early as about 4,580 BCE. Evidence indicates they developed about 100 km^{2} (39 sq mi) of volcanic floodplains in the vicinity of Lake Condah into a complex of channels and dams, and used woven traps to capture eels, and to preserve them to eat all year round. The local Budj Bim Cultural Landscape, a World Heritage Site, is one of the oldest known aquaculture sites in the world. Anthropologist Peter Sutton has disputed that these eel trapping systems qualify as aquaculture as there is no evidence they involved the breeding, feeding, protecting, or rearing of eels.

Oral tradition in China tells of the culture of the common carp, Cyprinus carpio, as long ago as 2000–2100 BCE (around 4,000 years BP), but the earliest significant evidence lies in the literature, in the earliest monograph on fish culture called The Classic of Fish Culture, by Fan Li, written around 475 BCE (c. 2475 BP). Another ancient Chinese guide to aquaculture, wriiten by Yang Yu Jing around 460 BCE, shows that carp farming was becoming more sophisticated. The Jiahu site in China has circumstantial archeological evidence as possibly the oldest aquaculture locations, dating from 6200BCE (about 8,200 years BP), but this is speculative. When the waters subsided after river floods, some fish, mainly carp, were trapped in lakes. Early aquaculturists fed their brood using nymphs and silkworm faeces, and ate them.

Ancient Egyptians might have farmed fish (especially gilt-head bream) from Lake Bardawil about 1,500 BCE (about 3,500 BP), and they traded them with Canaan.

Gim cultivation is the oldest aquaculture in Korea. Early cultivation methods used bamboo or oak sticks; newer methods utilizing nets replaced them in the 19th century. Floating rafts have been used for mass production since the 1920s.

Japanese people cultivated seaweed by providing bamboo poles and, later, nets and oyster shells to serve as anchoring-surfaces for spores.

Romans bred fish in ponds and farmed oysters in coastal lagoons before 100 CE.

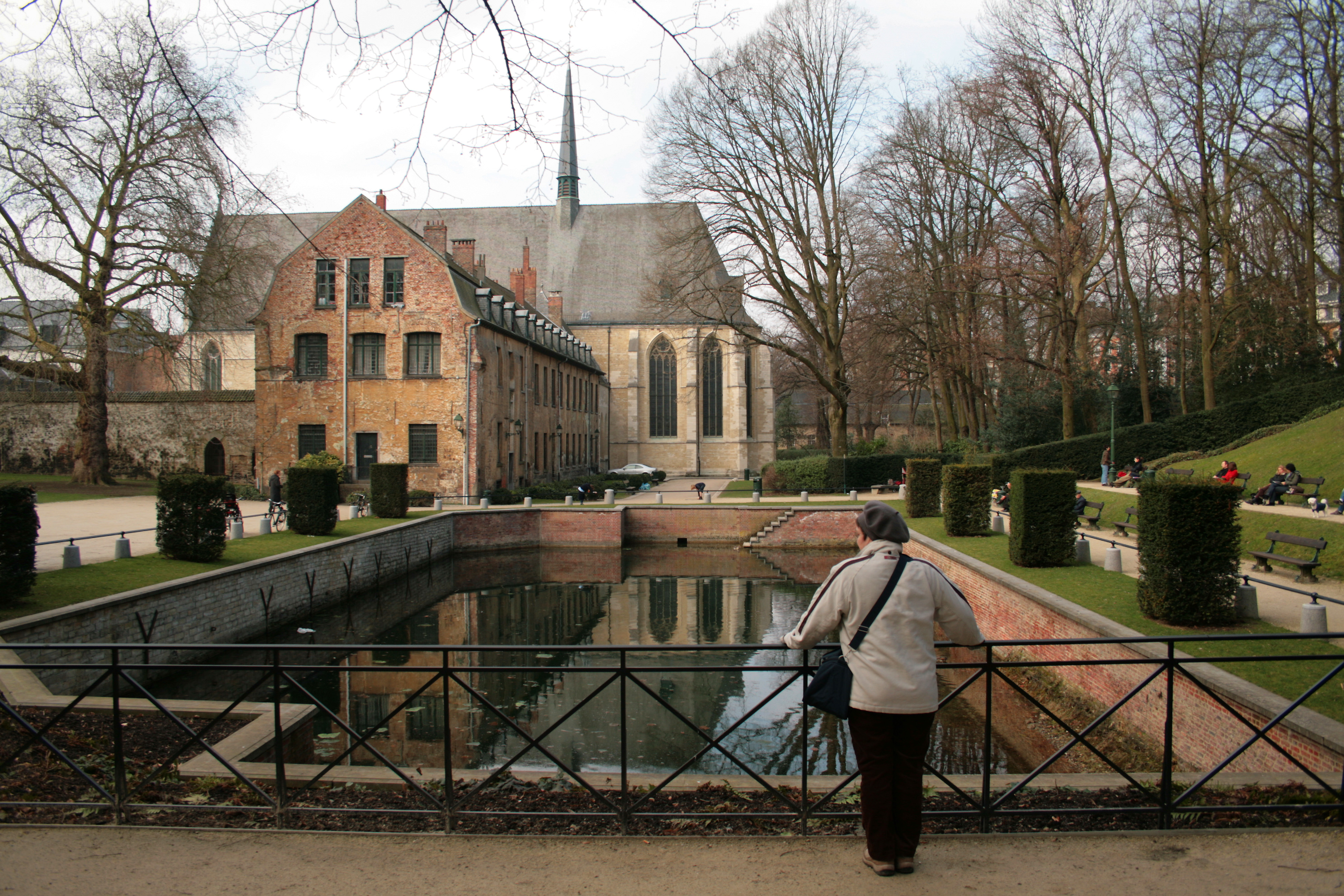
Fish pond of the La Cambre Abbey in Brussels, Belgium

In medieval Europe, early Christian monasteries adopted Roman aquacultural practices. Aquaculture spread because people away from coasts and big rivers were otherwise dependent on fish which required salting in order to be preserved. Fish was an important food source in medieval Europe, when in average 150 days per year were days of fasting and abstinence, and meat was prohibited. Improvements in transportation during the 19th century made fresh fish easily available and inexpensive, even in inland areas, rendering aquaculture less popular. The 15th-century fishponds of the Trebon Basin in the present-day Czech Republic are maintained as a tentative UNESCO World Heritage Site.

Samoans practised "a traditional form of giant clam ranching".

Hawaiians constructed oceanic fish ponds. A remarkable example is the "Menehune" fishpond dating from at least 1,000 years ago, at Alekoko. Legend records its construction by the mythical Menehune dwarf-people.

In the first half of the 18th century, German Stephan Ludwig Jacobi experimented with external fertilization of brown trout and salmon. He wrote an article "Von der künstlichen Erzeugung der Forellen und Lachse" (On the Artificial Production of Trout and Salmon) summarizing his findings, and earning him a reputation as the founder of artificial fish-rearing. By the latter decades of the 18th century, oyster-farming had begun in estuaries along the Atlantic Coast of North America.

The word "aquaculture" appeared in an 1855 newspaper article in reference to the harvesting of ice. It also appeared in descriptions of the terrestrial agricultural practise of sub-irrigation in the late-19th century before becoming associated primarily with the cultivation of aquatic plant- and animal-species. (The Oxford English Dictionary records the common modern usage of "aquaculture" from 1887; and that of "aquiculture" from 1867.)

In 1859, Stephen Ainsworth of West Bloomfield, New York, began experiments with brook trout. By 1864, Seth Green had established a commercial fish-hatching operation at Caledonia Springs, near Rochester, New York. By 1866, with the involvement of W. W. Fletcher of Concord, Massachusetts, artificial fish-hatcheries operated both in both Canada and in the United States. When the Dildo Island fish hatchery opened in Newfoundland in 1889, it was the largest and most advanced in the world. The word "aquaculture" was used in descriptions of the hatcheries experiments with cod and lobster in 1890.

By the 1920s, the American Fish Culture Company of Carolina, Rhode Island, founded in the 1870s, was one of the leading producers of trout. During the 1940s, they perfected the method of manipulating the day- and night-cycle of fish so that they could be artificially spawned year-round.

Californians harvested wild kelp and attempted to manage supply around 1900, later labeling it a wartime resource.

== See also ==
- Agroecology
- Alligator farm
- Certification for Aquaculture Professionals
- Fisheries science
- Fishery
- Industrial aquaculture
- List of commercially important fish species
- Maggots used as food for fish
- Oyster farming
- Recirculating aquaculture system
- Resource decoupling

== Sources ==
This article incorporates text from a free content work. Licensed under CC BY 4.0 (license statement/permission). Text taken from The State of World Fisheries and Aquaculture 2026, Food and Agriculture Organization of the United Nations.

This article incorporates text from a free content work. Licensed under CC BY 4.0. Text taken from The State of World Fisheries and Aquaculture 2024, p.10, FAO.
