= Recirculating aquaculture system =

Fish farming method

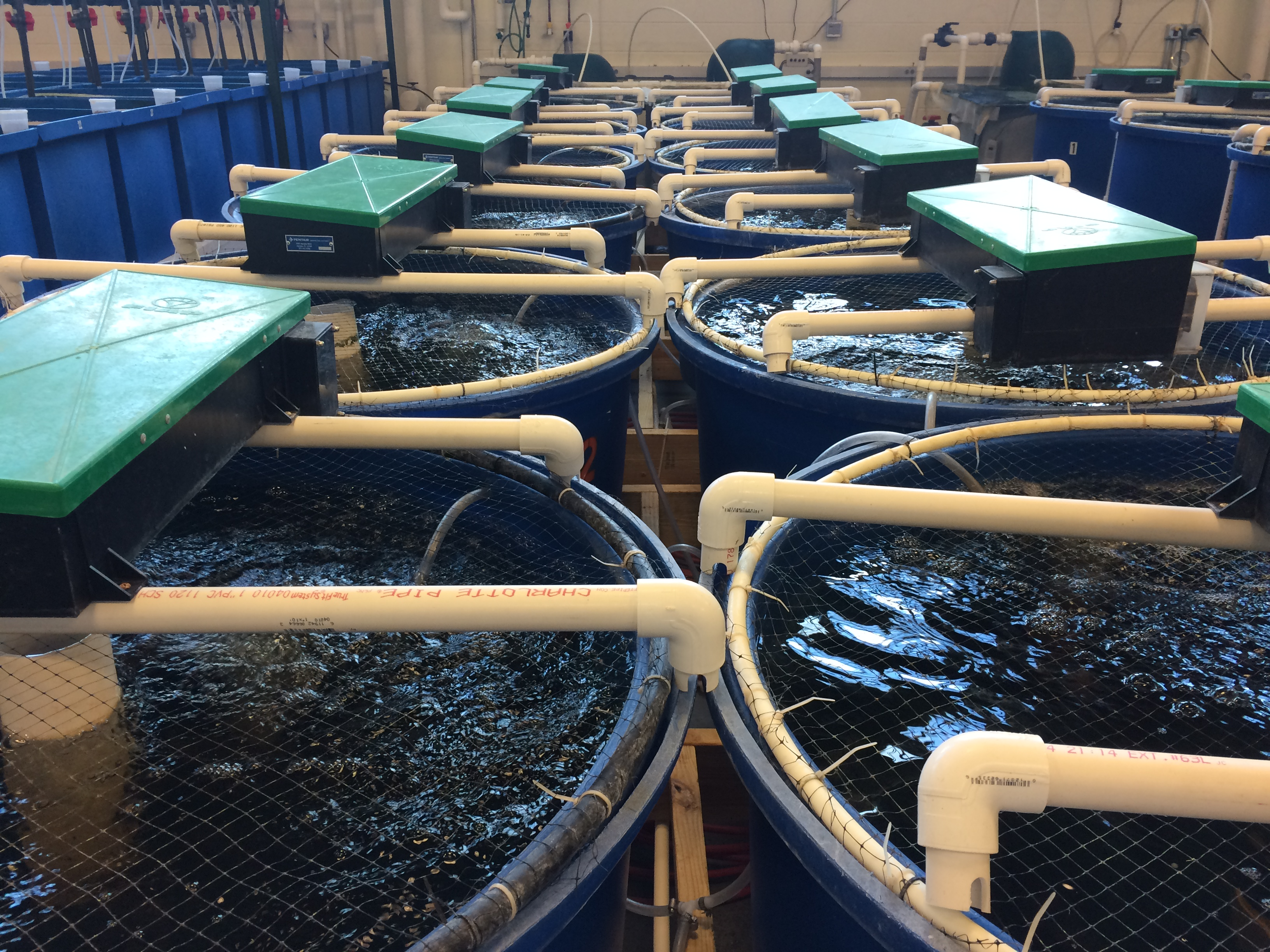
Recirculating aquaculture systems at the Virginia Tech Department of Food Science and Technology

Recirculating aquaculture systems (RAS) are used in home aquaria and for fish production where water exchange is limited and the use of biofiltration is required to reduce ammonia toxicity. Other types of filtration and environmental control are often also necessary to maintain clean water and provide a suitable habitat for fish. The main benefit of RAS is the ability to reduce the need for fresh, clean water while still maintaining a healthy environment for fish. To be operated economically commercial RAS must have high fish stocking densities, and many researchers are currently conducting studies to determine if RAS is a viable form of intensive aquaculture.

== RAS water treatment processes ==
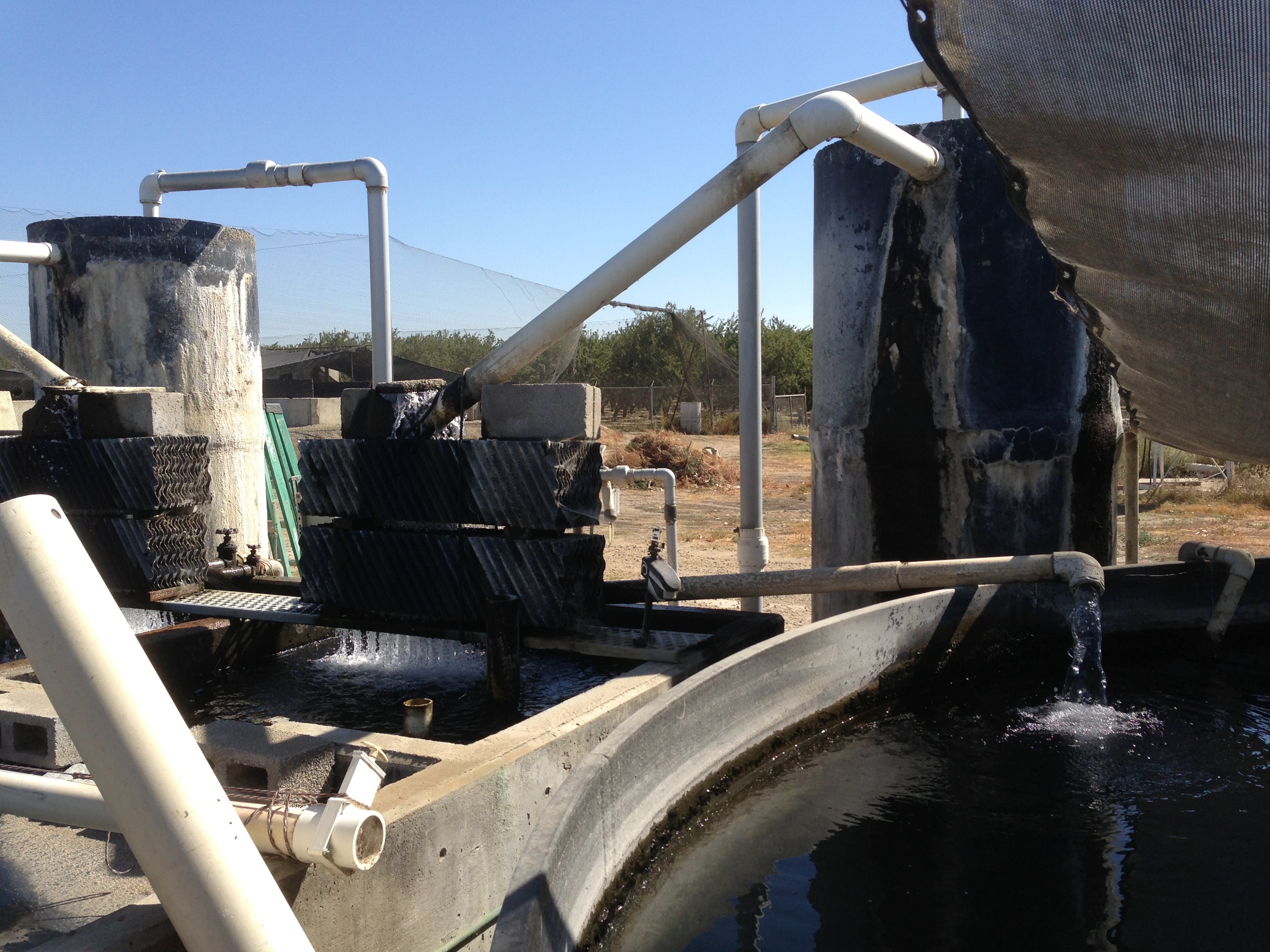
A biofilter and CO_{2} degasser on an outdoor recirculating aquaculture system used to grow largemouth bass

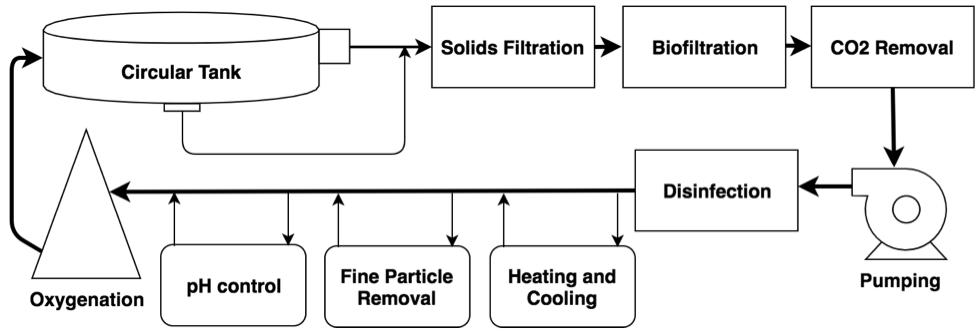
Water treatment processes needed in a recirculating aquaculture system

A series of treatment processes is utilized to maintain water quality in intensive fish farming operations. These steps are often done in order or sometimes in tandem. After leaving the vessel holding fish the water is first treated for solids before entering a biofilter to convert ammonia, next degassing and oxygenation occur, often followed by heating/cooling and sterilization. Each of these processes can be completed by using a variety of different methods and equipment, but regardless all must take place to ensure a healthy environment that maximizes fish growth and health.

=== Biofiltration ===
All RAS relies on biofiltration to convert ammonia (NH_{4}^{+} and NH_{3}) excreted by the fish into nitrate. Ammonia is a waste product of fish metabolism and high concentrations (>.02 mg/L) are toxic to most finfish. Nitrifying bacteria are chemoautotrophs that convert ammonia into nitrite (NO_{2}^{−}) then nitrate (NO_{3}^{−}). These include bacteria of the genera Nitrobacter, Nitrococcus, Nitrospira, and Nitrospina. Although nitrite is usually converted to nitrate as quickly as it is produced, lack of biological oxidation of the nitrite will result in elevated nitrite levels that can be toxic to the fish. High levels of nitrite are also indicative of biofilter impending failure. Nitrate is the end-product of nitrification, and is the least toxic of the nitrogen compounds, with 96-hour exposure LC_{50} values in freshwater in excess of 1,000 mg/L.

A biofilter provides a substrate for the bacterial community, which results in thick biofilm growing within the filter. Water is pumped through the filter, and ammonia is utilized by the bacteria for energy. In recirculating systems, daily water exchanges are commonly used to control nitrogen levels. Stable environmental conditions and regular maintenance are required to ensure the biofilter is operating efficiently.

=== Solids removal ===
In addition to treating the liquid waste excreted by fish the solid waste must also be treated, this is done by concentrating and flushing the solids out of the system. Removing solids reduces bacteria growth, oxygen demand, and the proliferation of disease. The simplest method for removing solids is the creation of settling basin where the relative velocity of the water is slow and particles can settle at the bottom of the tank where they are either flushed out or vacuumed out manually using a siphon. However, this method is not viable for RAS operations where a small footprint is desired. Typical RAS solids removal involves a sand filter or particle filter where solids become lodged and can be periodically backflushed out of the filter. Another common method is the use of a mechanical drum filter where water is run over a rotating drum screen that is periodically cleaned by pressurized spray nozzles, and the resulting slurry is treated or sent down the drain. In order to remove extremely fine particles or colloidal solids a protein fractionator may be used with or without the addition of ozone (O_{3}).

=== Oxygenation ===
Reoxygenating the system water is a crucial part to obtaining high production densities. Fish require oxygen to metabolize food and grow, as do bacteria communities in the biofilter. Dissolved oxygen levels can be increased through two methods, aeration and oxygenation. In aeration air is pumped through an air stone or similar device that creates small bubbles in the water column, this results in a high surface area where oxygen can dissolve into the water. In general due to slow gas dissolution rates and the high air pressure needed to create small bubbles this method is considered inefficient and the water is instead oxygenated by pumping in pure oxygen. Various methods are used to ensure that during oxygenation all of the oxygen dissolves into the water column. Careful calculation and consideration must be given to the oxygen demand of a given system, and that demand must be met with either oxygenation or aeration equipment.

=== pH control ===
In all RAS pH must be carefully monitored and controlled. The first step of nitrification in the biofilter consumes alkalinity and lowers the pH of the system. Keeping the pH in a suitable range (5.0-9.0 for freshwater systems) is crucial to maintain the health of both the fish and biofilter. pH is typically controlled by the addition of alkalinity in the form of lime (CaCO_{3}) or sodium hydroxide (NaOH). A low pH will lead to high levels of dissolved carbon dioxide (CO_{2}), which can prove toxic to fish. pH can also be controlled by degassing CO_{2} in a packed column or with an aerator, this is necessary in intensive systems especially where oxygenation instead of aeration is used in tanks to maintain O_{2} levels.

=== Temperature control ===
All fish species have a preferred temperature above and below which that fish will experience negative health effects and eventually death. Warm water species such as tilapia and barramundi prefer 24 °C water or warmer, where as cold water species such as trout and salmon prefer water temperature below 16 °C. Temperature also plays an important role in dissolved oxygen (DO) concentrations, with higher water temperatures having lower values for DO saturation. Temperature is controlled through the use of submerged heaters, heat pumps, chillers, and heat exchangers. All four may be used to keep a system operating at the optimal temperature for maximizing fish production.

=== Biosecurity ===
Disease outbreaks occur more readily when dealing with the high fish stocking densities typically employed in intensive RAS. Outbreaks can be reduced by operating multiple independent systems with the same building and isolating water to water contact between systems by cleaning equipment and personnel that move between systems. Also the use of an Ultraviolet (UV) or ozone water treatment system reduces the number of free floating virus and bacteria in the system water. These treatment systems reduce the disease loading that occurs on stressed fish and thus reduce the chance of an outbreak.

== Advantages ==
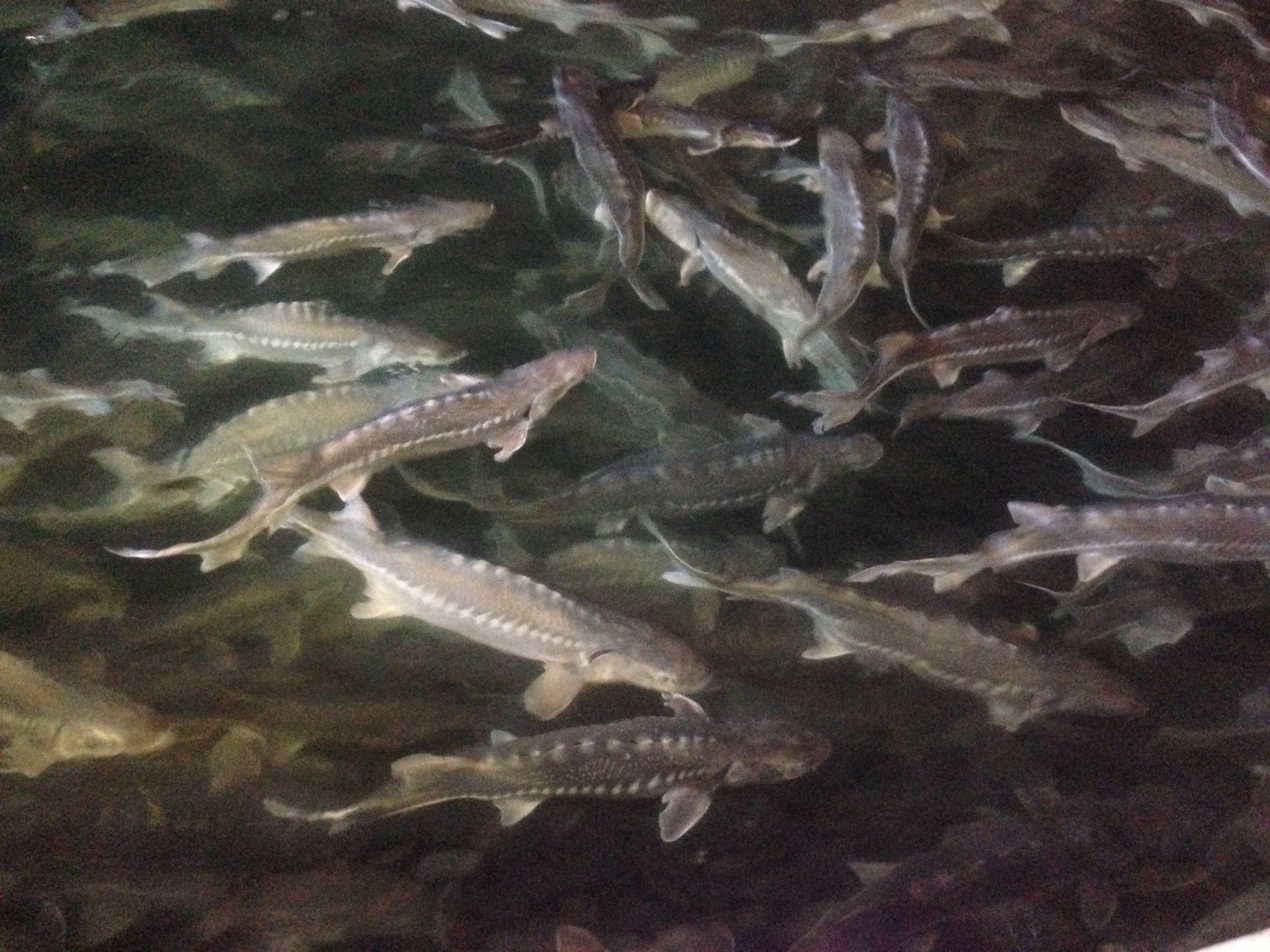
Sturgeon grown at high density in a partial recirculating aquaculture system

- Reduced water requirements as compared to raceway or pond aquaculture systems.
- Reduced land needs due to the high stocking density
- Site selection flexibility and independence from a large, clean water source.
- Reduction in wastewater effluent volume.
- Increased biosecurity and ease in treating disease outbreaks.
- Ability to closely monitor and control environmental conditions to maximize production efficiency. Similarly, independence from weather and variable environmental conditions.

== Disadvantages ==
Mean greenhouse gas emissions for different food types
Food Types	Greenhouse Gas Emissions (g CO2-Ceq per g protein)
Ruminant Meat	62
Recirculating Aquaculture	30
Trawling Fishery	26
Non-recirculating Aquaculture	12
Pork	10
Poultry	10
Dairy	9.1
Non-trawling Fishery	8.6
Eggs	6.8
Starchy Roots	1.7
Wheat	1.2
Maize	1.2
Legumes	0.25

- High upfront investment in materials and infrastructure.
- High operating costs mostly due to electricity, and system maintenance.
- A need for highly trained staff to monitor and operate the system.
- Higher greenhouse gas emissions than non-recirculating aquaculture.

== Special types of RAS ==
=== Aquaponics ===
Combining plants and fish in a RAS is referred to as aquaponics. In this type of system ammonia produced by the fish is not only converted to nitrate but is also removed by the plants from the water. In an aquaponics system fish effectively fertilize the plants, this creates a closed looped system where very little waste is generated and inputs are minimized. Aquaponics provides the advantage of being able to harvest and sell multiple crops. Contradictory views exist on the suitability and safety of RAS effluents to sustain plant growth under aquaponics condition. Future conversions, rather ‘upgrades’, of operational RAS farms to semi-commercial Aquaponic ventures should not be deterred by nutrient insufficiency or nutrient safety arguments. Incentivizing RAS farm wastes through semi-commercial aquaponics is encouraged. Nutrients locked in RAS wastewater and sludge have sufficient and safe nutrients to sustain plant growth under aquaponics condition.

=== Aquariums ===
Home aquaria and inland commercial aquariums are a form of RAS where the water quality is very carefully controlled and the stocking density of fish is relatively low. In these systems the goal is to display the fish rather than producing food. However, biofilters and other forms of water treatment are still used to reduce the need to exchange water and to maintain water clarity. Just like in traditional RAS water must be removed periodically to prevent nitrate and other toxic chemicals from building up in the system. Coastal aquariums often have high rates of water exchange and are typically not operated as a RAS due to their proximity to a large body of clean water.

== See also ==
- Controlled-environment agriculture
