= Michael Lai =

Michael Lai may refer to:

- Michael M. C. Lai (born 1942), Taiwanese virologist
- Michael Lai (composer) (1946–2019), Hong Kong composer
- Michael Lai (tennis), completed for Hong Kong in Tennis at the 2010 Asian Games – Men's doubles
