= Sophiline Cheam Shapiro =

Cambodian dancer and choreographer

Sophiline Cheam-Shapiro
- ឝភីរោ ជាម សុភិលីន
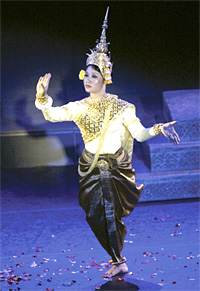
- Shapiro performing in 2009
- Born: 1967 (age 57–58); Kingdom of Cambodia
- Education: School of Fine Arts, Phnom Penh
- Occupation(s): Dancer; Educator
- Years active: c. 1975–present
- Spouse: John Shapiro (m. 1991–present)
- Awards: Nikkei Asia Prize: Culture and Community (2006); National Heritage Fellowship (2009)

Sophiline Cheam Shapiro (Khmer: ឝភីរោ ជាម សុភិលីន; born 1967) is a Cambodian dancer, choreographer, and educator.

== Early life ==
At the age of eight, Shapiro was forced to live in the countryside of Cambodia after her family was evacuated from the city by the Khmer Rouge. When the Cambodian Civil War had ended, the national School of Fine Arts was reopened, where Shapiro was one of the first students to learn from the masters of dance who had survived both the end of the court and the later violence of Pol Pot, who specially targeted artists. Being among the first generation of classically trained Cambodian dancers to graduate from the School of Fine Arts in Phnom Penh, she devoted herself to master the complex and intricate gestures and movements of classical Cambodian dance. In 2002, along with her husband, she launched the Khmer Arts Academy to teach a new generation of Cambodian-Americans the traditional art and culture of Cambodia.

== Career ==
Shapiro's choreography has been credited with infusing the classical form with new ideas. In 1990, Shapiro did a classical Cambodian dance adaptation of Othello called Samrithechak (2000) (Khmer: សំរឹទ្ធិចក្រ), using symbolism and metaphors to allude to the guilt of the Khmer Rouge, and their denial of the crimes they committed on Cambodia. Her choreography includes The Glass Box (2002) and Seasons of Migration (2005), which she has set on Cambodia's finest performing artists and toured to three continents. Notable venues include Cal Performances, the Hong Kong Arts Festival, New York's Joyce Theater and the Venice Biennale. Pamina Devi had its world premiere at the Schönbrunn Palace Theater as part of Vienna's New Crowned Hope Festival (2006). Her collaboration with composer Chinary Ung for the Los Angeles Master Chorale debuted in November 2008 at the Walt Disney Concert Hall. In 2013, Khmer Arts Ensemble premiered "A Bend in the River," a collaboration with sculptor Sopheap Pich and composer Him Sophy.

Shapiro has received a number of honors, including Asia 21, Creative Capital, Durfee, Guggenheim and Irvine Dance Fellowships, as well as the Nikkei Asia Prize for Culture. She was a member of the first generation to train at and graduate from Phnom Penh's School of Fine Arts after the fall of Pol Pot, and she has studied dance ethnology at undergraduate and graduate levels at UCLA's Department of World Arts & Cultures. She is a recipient of a 2009 National Heritage Fellowship awarded by the National Endowment for the Arts, which is the United States government's highest honor in the folk and traditional arts. She was also named a 2009 Fellow by United States Artists.

== Personal life ==
In 1991, she married John Shapiro, and the couple settled in Los Angeles.

== Achievements ==
- 2006: Winner of Nikkei Asia Prize: Culture Prize
