= Liao I-chiu =

Taiwanese scientist

- 廖一久
- Born: November 4, 1936 (age 89); Tokyo
- Citizenship: Republic of China (Taiwan)

Academic background
- Education: University of Tokyo (PhD)

Academic work
- Discipline: Biologist
- Sub-discipline: Aquaculture and invertebrate breeding

Liao I-chiu (Chinese: 廖一久; pinyin: Liào Yījiǔ) (b. Nov. 4, 1936) is a Taiwanese academic who specializes in commercial aquatic animal breeding and aquaculture. He is known as the "Father of Shrimp Farming".

== Early life and education ==
Liao was born in Tokyo to Taiwanese parents on 4 November 1936, and moved to Taiwan at the age of four. He grew up in Fengyuan, Taichung. In 1962 he went back to Japan to study at the University of Tokyo. He returned to Taiwan in 1968 after earning his Ph.D. in agriculture.

== Career ==
In the late 1960s Liao played an important role in developing methods to farm tiger shrimp. In 1968 he was named a fellow of the Rockefeller Foundation.

Liao is a fellow at Academia Sinica and The World Academy of Sciences and a distinguished professor at National Taiwan Ocean University.

== Awards and recognitions ==
In 2012, he was given a Lifetime Achievement Award by the Global Aquaculture Alliance.

In 2014, Liao was awarded the Order of the Rising Sun, Gold Rays with Rosette by the Japanese Government.

In 2019, he was awarded the Nikkei Asia Prize in Science and Technology for his work on shrimp breeding.

In 2020, he became a laureate of the Asian Scientist 100 by the Asian Scientist.

== See also ==
- Maritime industries of Taiwan
- Aquaculture in Taiwan
