= Nikkei Asia Prize =

The Nikkei Asia Prize (Japanese: 日経アジア賞) is an award which recognizes the achievements of people and organizations that have improved the lives of people throughout Asia. The awards were created and presented by Nikkei Inc, one of the largest media corporations in Japan.

Launched in 1996, the program honors people in Asia who have made significant contributions in one of the three areas: regional growth; science, technology and innovation; and culture.

The category for regional growth (Economic and Business Innovation) is designed to recognize business and economic initiatives that improve living standards and stability in their regions. This could be entrepreneurs who have successfully developed industries and businesses due to innovation.

The category for science, technology and environment was established to recognize scientific researches and technological innovations in various fields.

The category for Culture is designed to recognize people who have made a difference in their countries and Asia through cultural, artistic or educational activities.

== Winners ==
=== Economic and Business Innovation (formerly Regional Growth) ===
- 1996: Dr. Widjojo Nitisastro
- 1997: Dr. Manmohan Singh
- 1998: Mr. Ni Runfeng
- 1999: Mr. Shi Wen-long
- 2000: Dr. Supachai Panitchpakdi
- 2001: Mr. N. R. Narayana Murthy
- 2002: Dr. Võ Tòng Xuân
- 2003: Mr. Lee Hun-jai
- 2004: Dr. Muhammad Yunus
- 2005: Dr. Morris Chang
- 2006: Ms. Olivia Lum
- 2007: Mr. Mechai Viravaidya
- 2008: Center of Legal Assistance to Pollution Victims in China at China University of Political Science and Law
- 2009: Ms. Kiran Mazumdar-Shaw
- 2010: Mr. Tony Fernandes
- 2011: Mr. Antonio Meloto
- 2012: Mr. Yang Yong
- 2013: Mr. Truong Gia Binh
- 2014: Dr. Devi Prasad Shetty
- 2015: Ms. Mai Kieu Lien
- 2016: Akshaya Patra Foundation
- 2017: Mr. Nandan Nilekani
- 2018: Mr. Ma Jun
- 2019: Mr. Nadiem Makarim

=== Science, Technology and Environment ===
- 1996: Prof. Yuan Longping
- 1997: Dr. Hyung Sup Choi
- 1998: Rubber Research Institute of Malaysia (RRIM)
- 1999: Prof. Zhao Qiguo
- 2000: Institute of Molecular and Cell Biology (Singapore)
- 2001: Dr. Ho Wang Lee
- 2002: Department of Medical Microbiology, Faculty of Medicine, University of Malaya
- 2003: Dr. Yang Huanming
- 2004: Dr. Yongyuth Yuthavong
- 2005: Prof. Ko Myoung Sam
- 2006: Mr. Philip Yeo
- 2007: Mr. Chang Chun-yen
- 2008: Dr. C. N. R. Rao
- 2009: Forest Research Institute Malaysia (FRIM)
- 2010: Dr. Ding-Shinn Chen
- 2011: Dr. Maw-Kuen Wu
- 2012: Dr. Chi-Huey Wong
- 2013: Prof. Tejraj M. Aminabhavi
- 2014: Dr. George F. Gao
- 2015: Dr. Wang Yifang
- 2016: Dr. Jiang Lei
- 2017: Dr. Michael M. C. Lai
- 2018: Prof. Nguyen Thanh Liem
- 2019: Dr. Liao I-chiu
- 2020: Prof. Thalappil Pradeep

=== Culture and Community ===
- 1996: Dara Kanlaya
- 1997: José Maceda
- 1998: Kim Jeong Ok
- 1999: Dang Nhat Minh
- 2000: Dr. Pinyo Suwankiri
- 2001: The Nepal Bhasa Dictionary Committee
- 2002: Christine Hakim
- 2003: Urvashi Butalia
- 2004: Albert Wendt
- 2005: Guo Dalie
- 2006: Sophiline Cheam Shapiro
- 2007: G. Venu
- 2008: Ahn Sung-ki
- 2009: Dr. Laretna T. Adishakti
- 2010: Manteb Soedharsono
- 2011: Bảo Ninh
- 2012: Sybil Wettasinghe
- 2013: Vann Molyvann
- 2014: Mae Fah Luang Foundation
- 2015: Asian Youth Orchestra
- 2016: Dogmid Sosorbaram
- 2017: Edhi Foundation
- 2018: Dr. Bindeshwar Pathak
- 2019: Cinemalaya Foundation Inc.

== See also ==
- List of awards for contributions to culture
- List of awards for contributions to society

== External links and sources ==
- Nikkei Asia Prize Winners
