= Aquaculture in Taiwan =

Industry in Taiwan

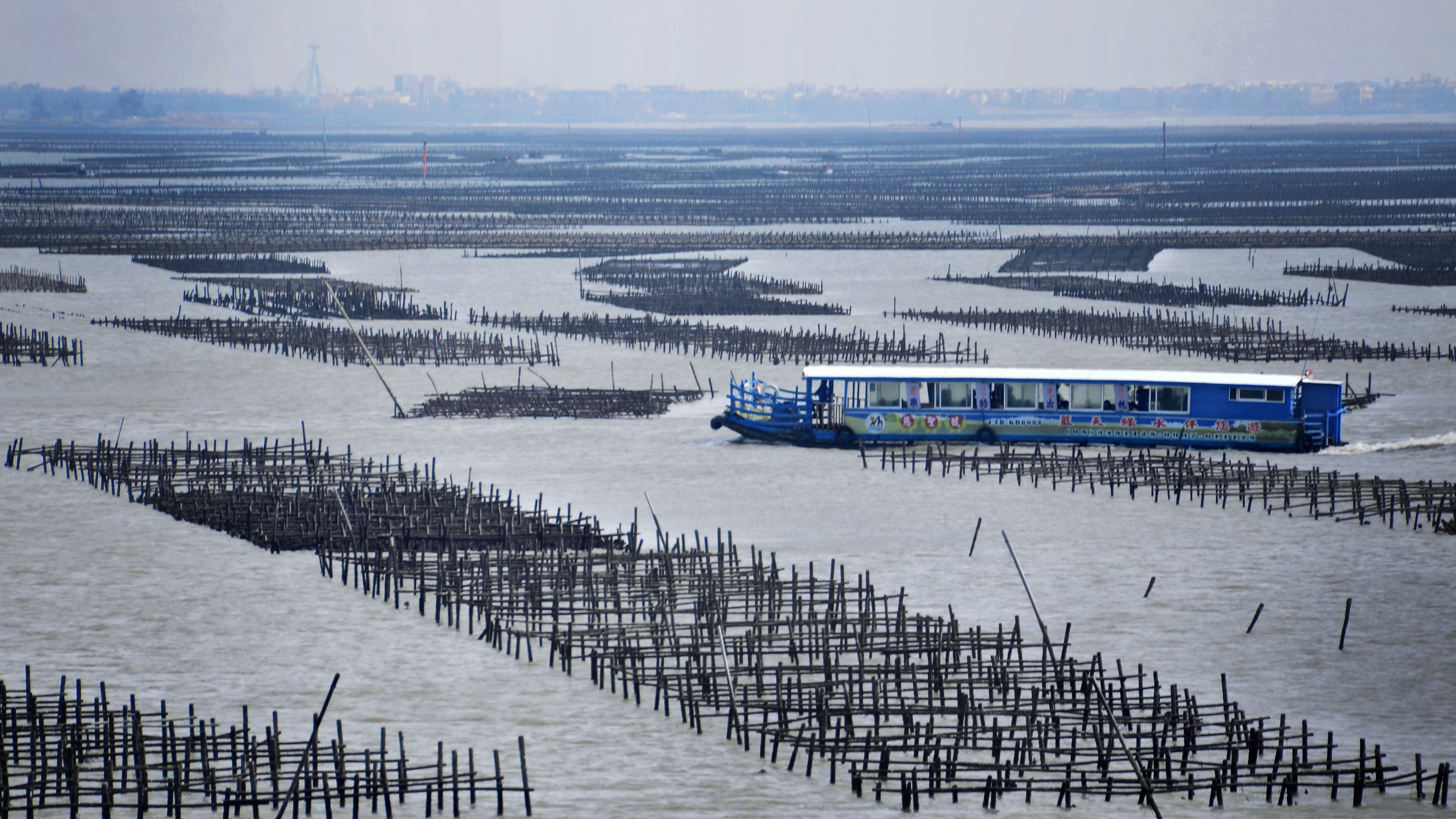
Oyster Trellis at Dongshi fishing harbour, Chiayi County

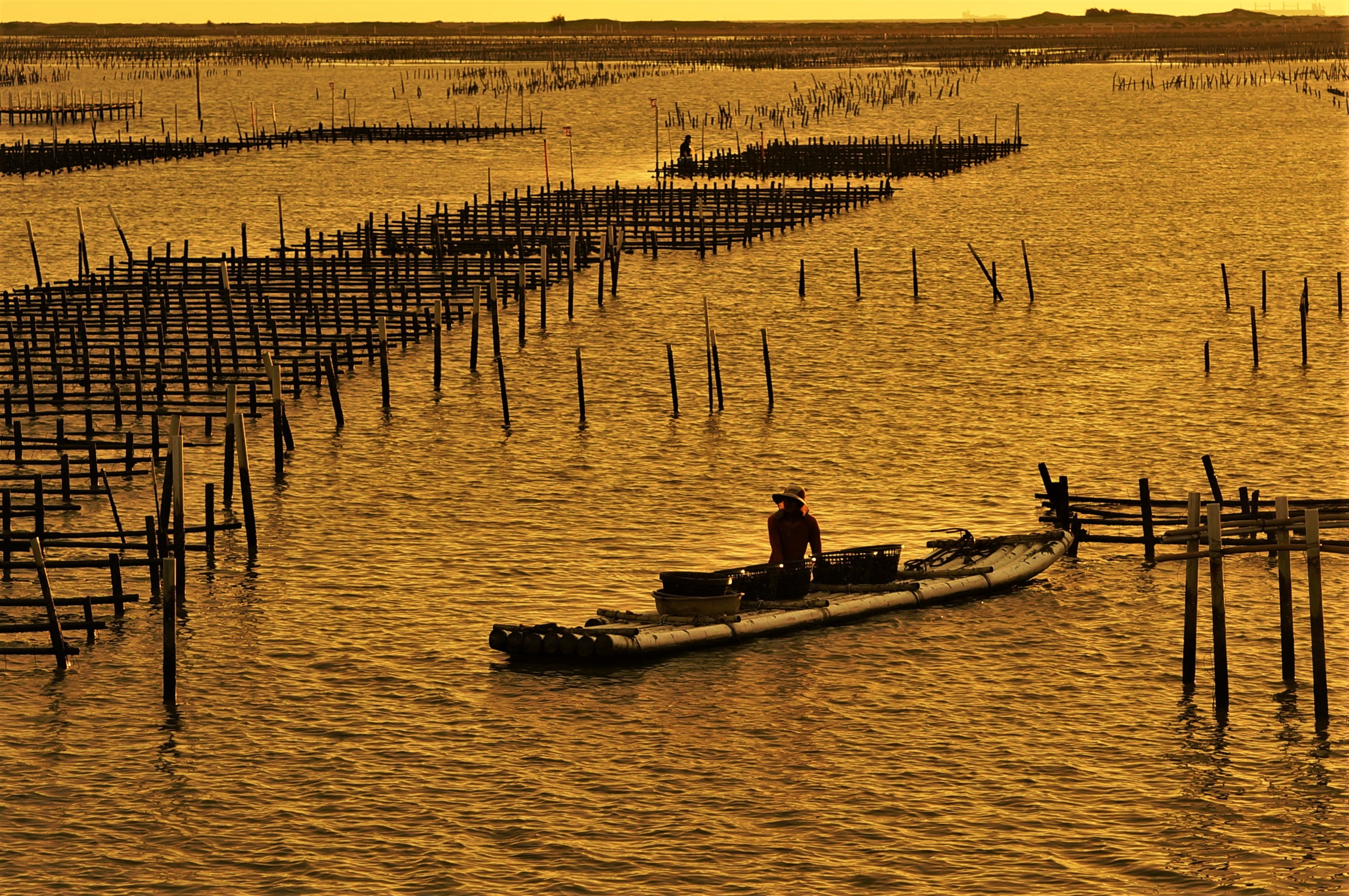
Oyster trellises in Tainan

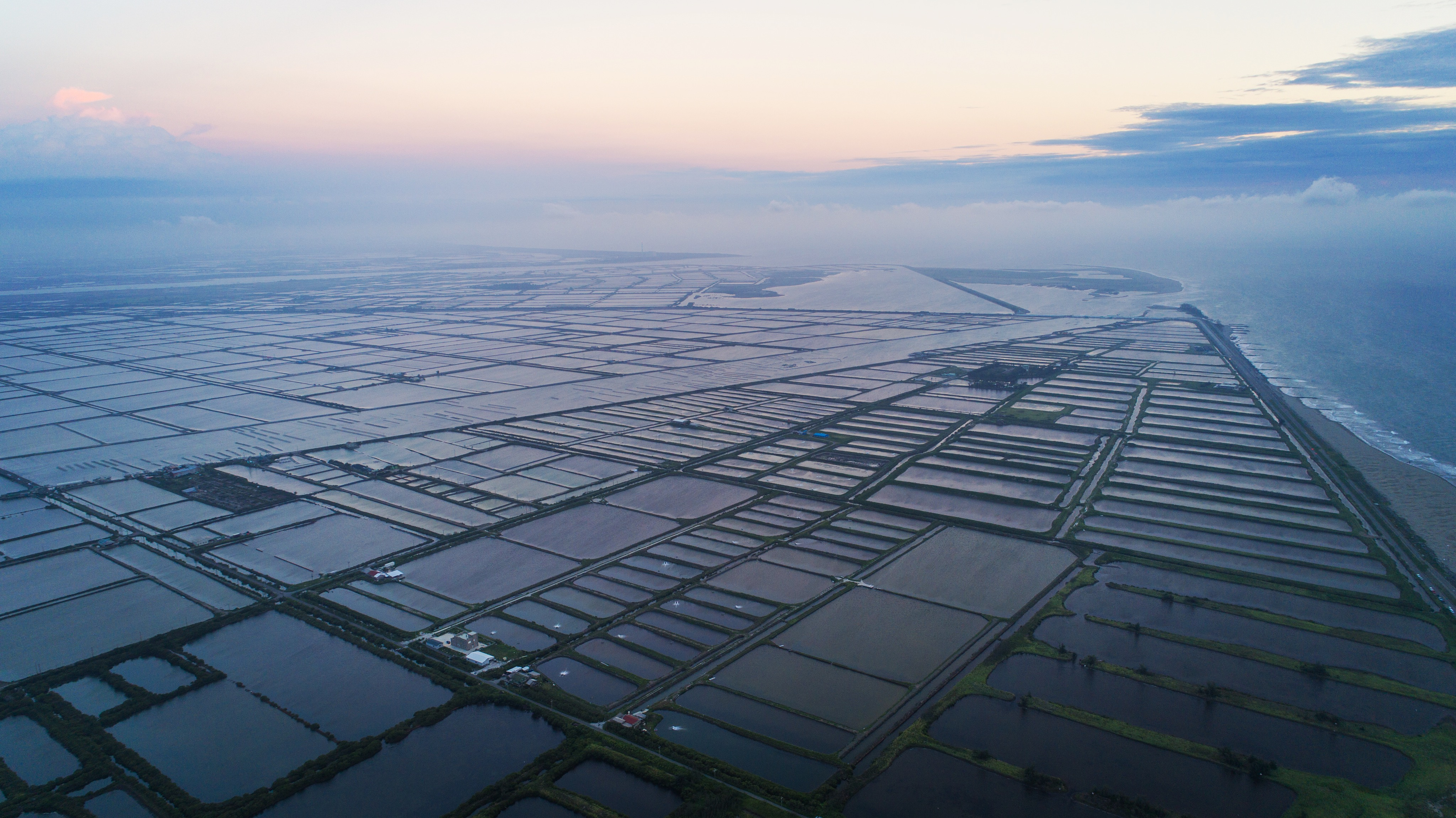
Fish farms in Cigu District, Tainan

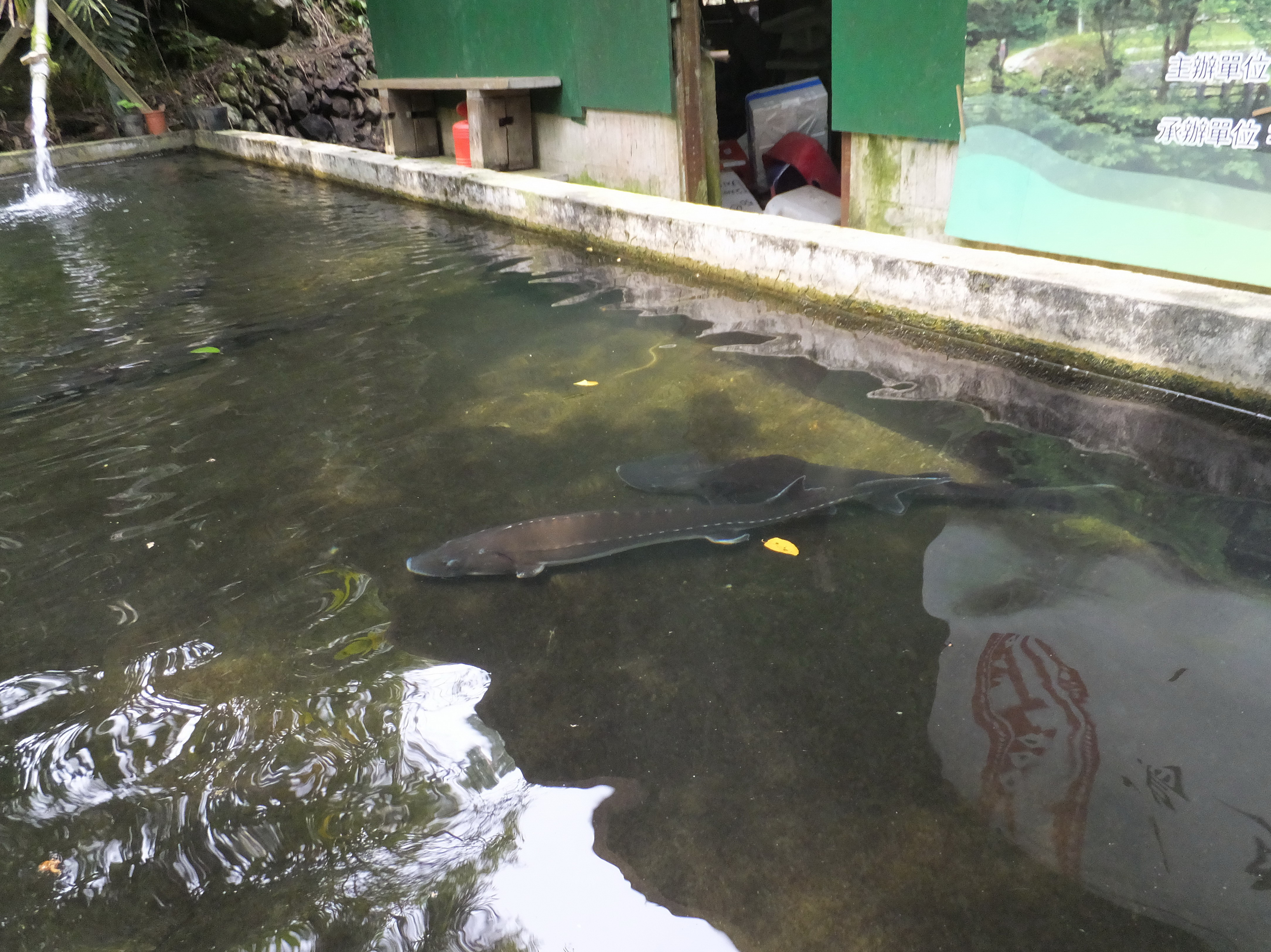
Aquaculture of sturgeon

Aquaculture has a long history in Taiwan and is an important component of the Maritime industries of Taiwan.

== History ==
By 2006 the production of Taiwanese coastal aquaculture was valued at NT$11,817 million.

In the 21st century high technology is playing a greater part in Taiwan's aquaculture industry as the industry struggles to cope with labor shortages and fierce foreign competition. The Taiwanese government operates six fisheries and aquaculture research centers.

=== Shrimp and prawns ===
The Taiwanese scientist Liao I-chiu is known as the "Father of Shrimp Farming,” having pioneered many of the techniques and overcome many of the technical hurdles which allowed the creation of the modern global shrimp farming industry.

In 2020 Taiwanese shrimp researcher Luo Chu-fang received the annual award for outstanding contributions to the control of animal disease and/or veterinary public health from the World Organisation for Animal Health (OIE). Luo Chu-fang is a retired academic chair at National Cheng Kung University. She was the first Taiwanese to win a World Organisation for Animal Health award.

The giant river prawn is widely cultivated in Taiwan. In 2012 Taiwan produced 3% of world production.

=== Grouper ===
In 1975 Taiwan began ocean ranching of grouper. Ocean ranching of grouper involves growing wild caught individuals to market size.

In 1995 Long Diann Bio Technology Co. Ltd. with the help of the Eastern Marine Biology Research Center successfully developed hatchery techniques for giant grouper (Epinephelus lanceolatus). Other species cultured are the Malabar grouper, the orange-spotted grouper, the brown-marbled grouper, the potato grouper, and the leopard coral grouper. In the 2000s Taiwan emerged as a global leader in grouper farming. In 2007 the 89 grouper farmers on Taiwan utilized 1,554.31 hectares of land and produced 17,234 tons of grouper valued at NT$3.88 billion (US$117.68 million). Grouper are shipped live on specially built vessels to Hong Kong and mainland China.

=== Milkfish ===
Milkfish is one of Taiwan's most commercially important fish, yearly production is 50,000 tons of milkfish valued at $4.1 billion New Taiwan Dollars. Consumption and ranching of milkfish in Taiwan dates back hundreds of years. Milkfish is primarily consumed with congee, pan-fried, as fish ball soup, or braised. Milkfish soup (Shimu Yu) is a southern Taiwanese speciality. Tainan is the center of milkfish production raising half of the country’s total production.

In recent years Taiwanese farms have begun raising organic milkfish. Some milkfish is exported, primarily to the United States and the Middle East.

=== Eel ===
In the 1990s the primary export market for eels was Japan. Taiwanese business also heavily invested in eel production in Southeast Asia. Taiwan's dominance in the eel market ended as production expanded in neighboring countries.

Exports of adult eels to Japan have decreased, the export of baby eels bred in Taiwan has increased in absolute terms but has decreased relative to other nations.

=== Ornamentals ===
The Taiwanese ornamental fish and shrimp industry is significant with more than 250 commercial operations, ~200 of them with operations in Pingtung County. Taiwan was once known as the “cichlid kingdom” for its specialization in cichlids, a fad which culminated in the breeding of the blood parrot cichlid in 1986. The fields of biotechnology and applied ecology are playing an ever increasing role in the Taiwanese aquarium sector.

National Pingtung University of Science and Technology offers one of the world's only graduate programs focussing on aquarium fish.

== Events ==
The Aquaculture Taiwan Expo & Forum is the primary aquaculture trade show in Taiwan, it is held concurrently with the Livestock Taiwan Expo & Forum and the Asia Agri-Tech Expo & Forum.

== See also ==
- Agriculture in Taiwan
- Fishing industry in Taiwan
