= Dogmid Sosorbaram =

Mongolian singer and activist

Dogmid Sosorbaram (born 1958) is a Mongolian singer and democracy activist.

== Biography ==
Sosorbaram was born in 1958 to a nomadic family in southern central Mongolia. He learned to sing as a child. At university he majored in theater and became involved in Mongolia's democracy movement, he rose to prominence within the movement helping to unite Mongolia's various opposition parties. In 1990 he gave the opening address at the Democratic Party's first national convention.

== Recognitions and awards ==
In 2016 he received the Nikkei Asia Prize in Culture and Community, he was the first Mongolian to win the prize in any category.

== See also ==
- Politics of Mongolia
