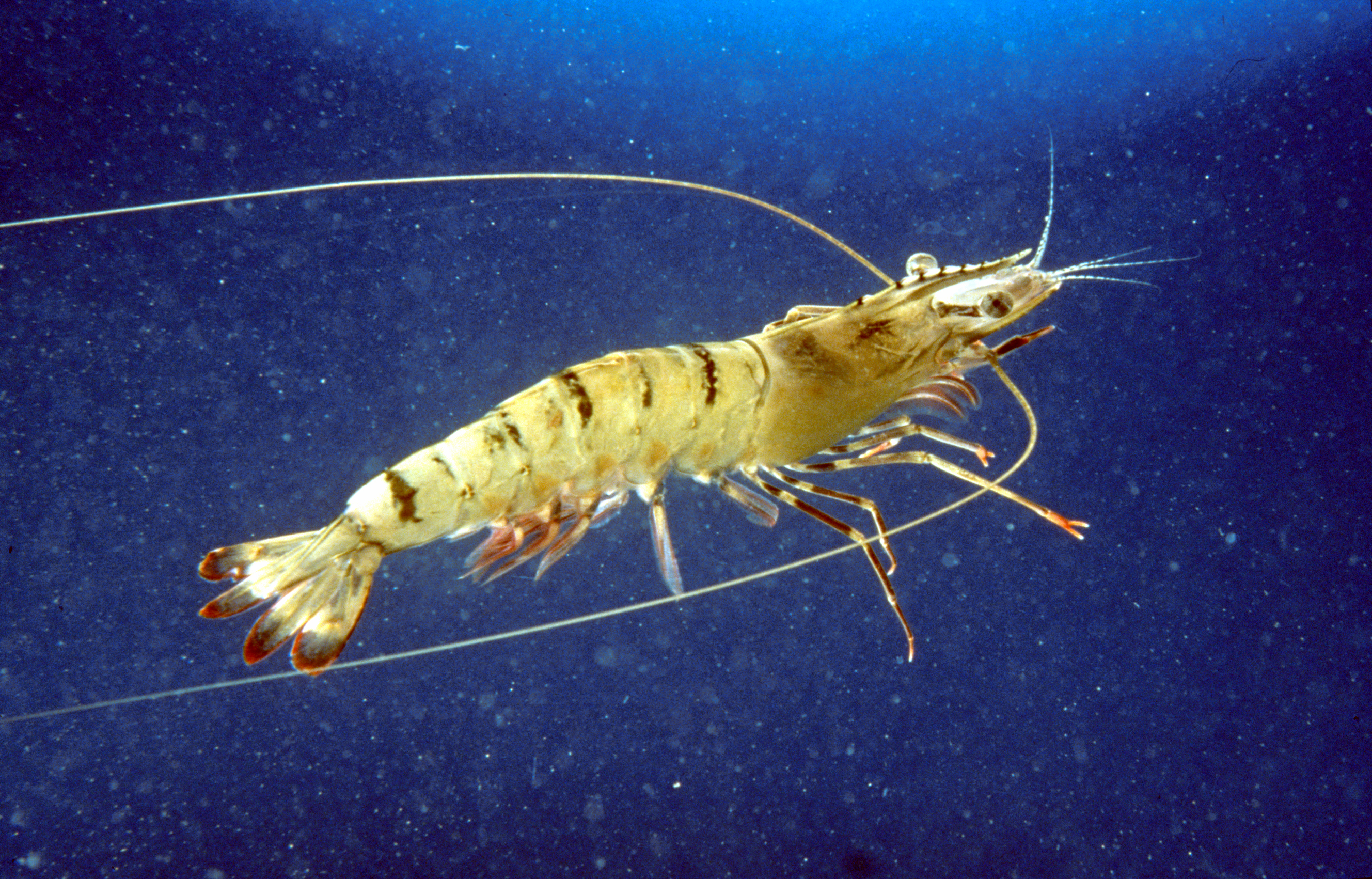

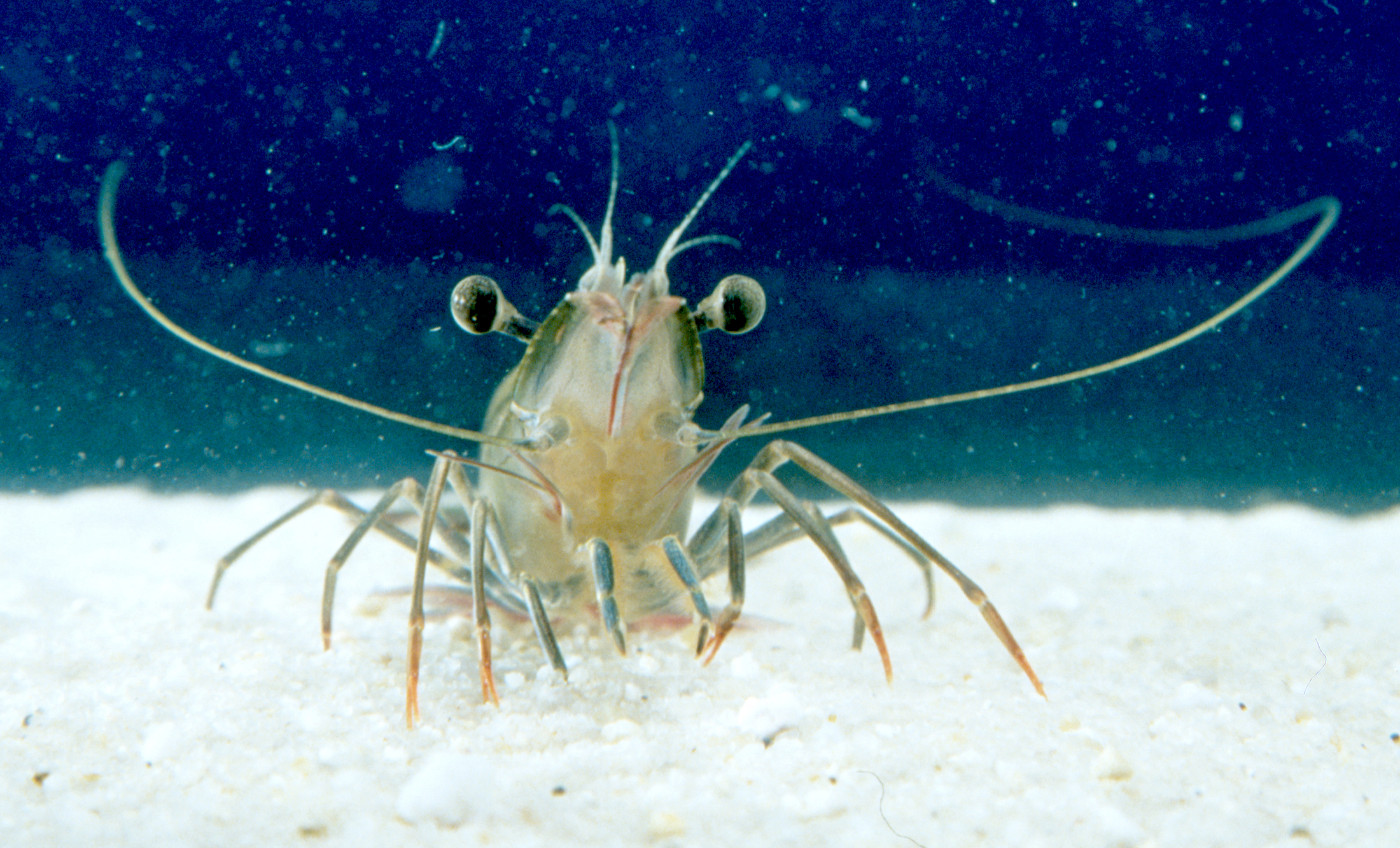

Scientific classification
- Kingdom: Animalia
- Phylum: Arthropoda
- Clade: Pancrustacea
- Class: Malacostraca
- Order: Decapoda
- Suborder: Dendrobranchiata
- Family: Penaeidae
- Genus: Penaeus
- Species: P. monodon

Binomial name
- Penaeus monodon Fabricius, 1798

Synonyms
- Penaeus carinatus Dana, 1852; Penaeus tahitensis Heller, 1862; Penaeus coeruleus Stebbing, 1905; Penaeus bubulus Kubo, 1949

= Penaeus monodon =

Species of crustacean

Penaeus monodon, commonly known as the giant tiger prawn, Asian tiger shrimp, black tiger shrimp, and other names, is a marine crustacean that is widely reared for food.

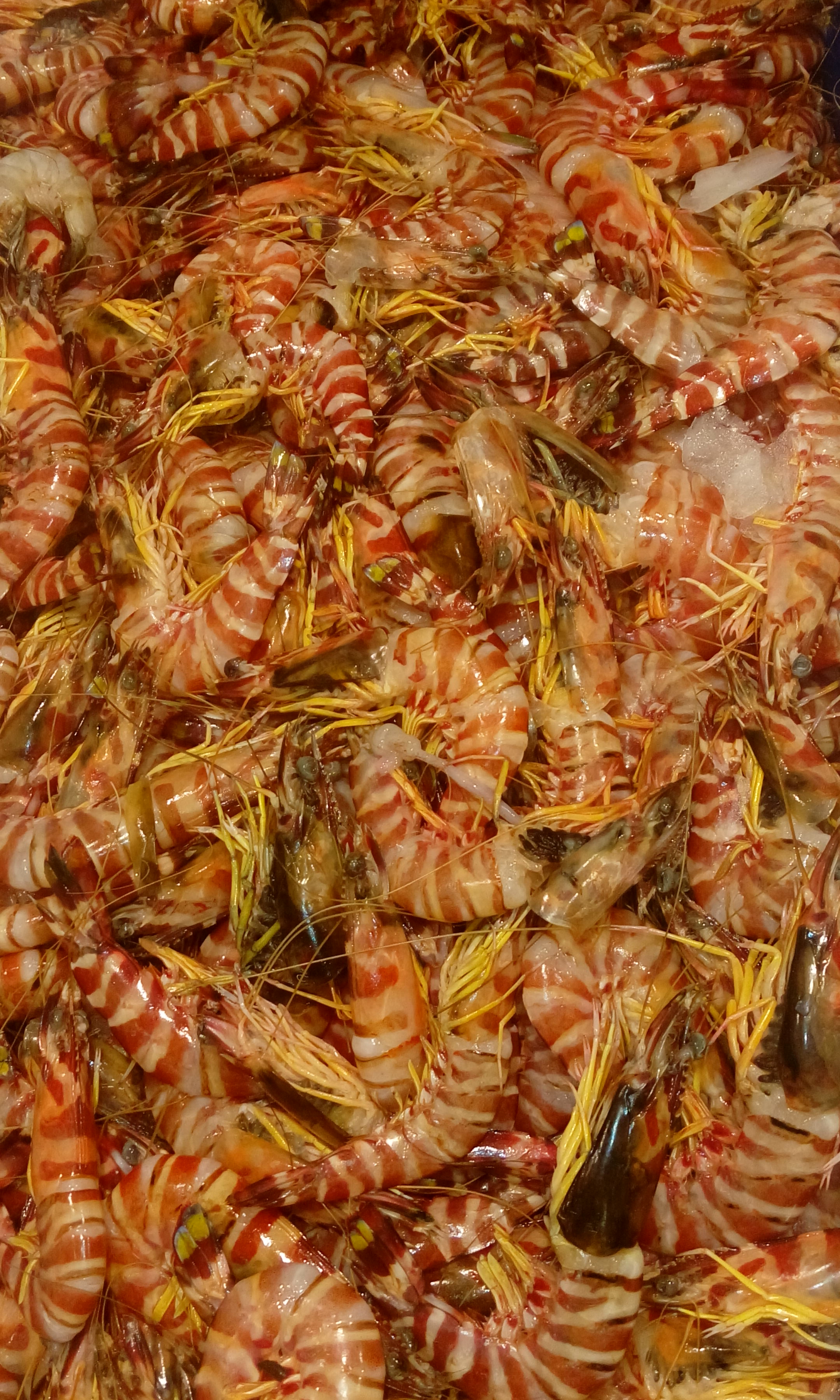
Tiger prawns displayed in a supermarket

== Taxonomy ==
Penaeus monodon was first described by Johan Christian Fabricius in 1798. That name was overlooked until 1949, when Lipke Holthuis clarified to which species it referred. Holthuis also showed that P. monodon had to be the type species of the genus Penaeus.

== Description ==
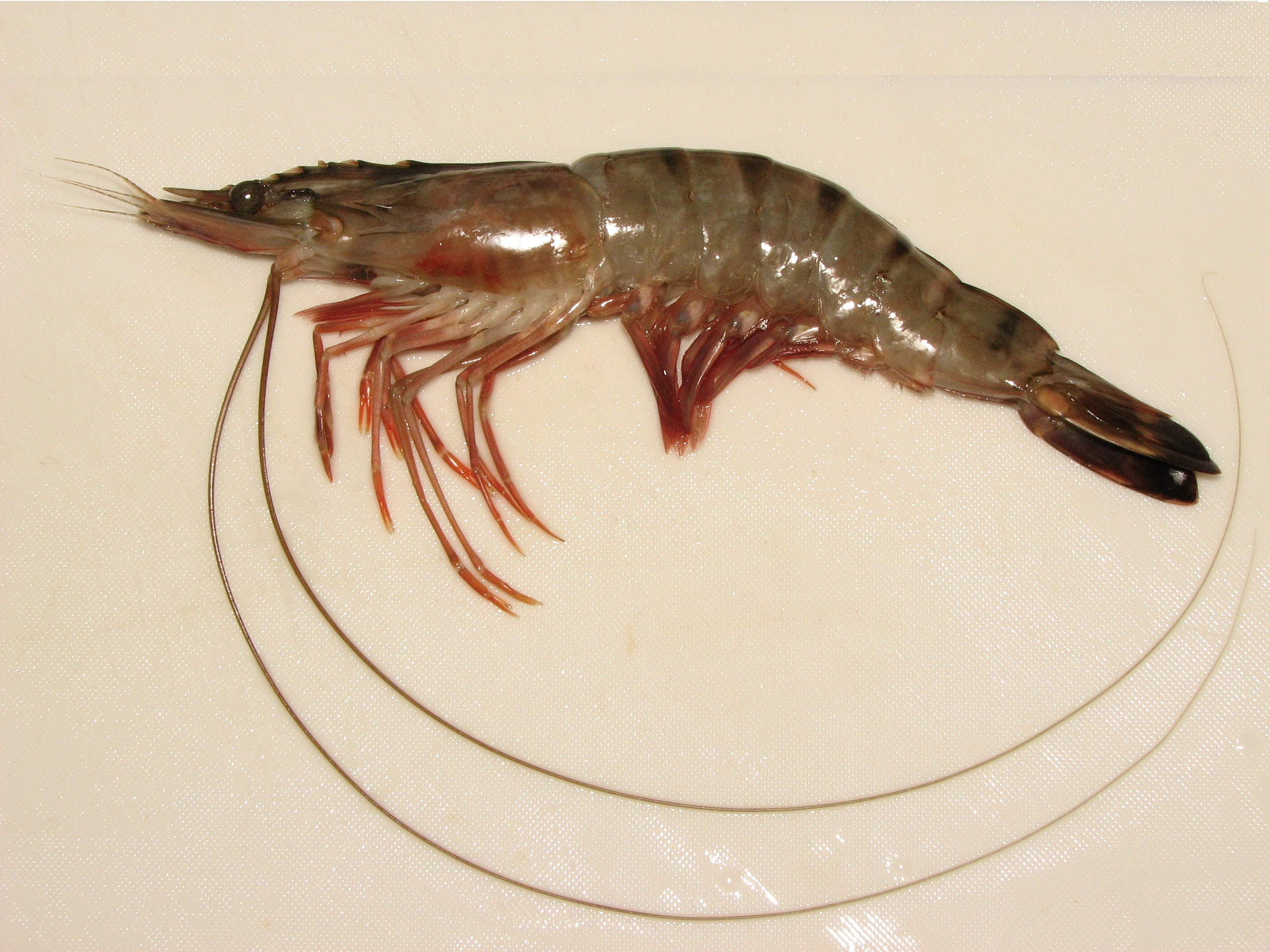

Females can reach about 33 cm (13 in) long, but are typically 25–30 cm (10–12 in) long and weigh 200–320 g (7–11 1/2 oz); males are slightly smaller at 20–25 cm (8–10 in) long and weighing 100–170 g (3 1/2–6 oz). The carapace and abdomen are transversely banded with alternating red and white. The antennae are grayish brown. Brown pereiopods and pleopods are present with fringing setae in red.

== Distribution ==
Its natural distribution is the Indo-Pacific, ranging from the eastern coast of Africa and the Arabian Peninsula, as far as Southeast Asia, the Pacific Ocean, and northern Australia.

It is an invasive species in the northern waters of the Gulf of Mexico and the Atlantic Ocean off the Southern U.S.

=== Invasive species ===
The first occurrence of P. monodon in the U.S. was in November 1988. Close to 300 shrimp were captured off the Southeastern shore after an accidental release from an aquaculture facility. This species can now be caught in waters from Texas to North Carolina. Although P. monodon has been an invasive species for many years, it has yet to grow large, established populations. Escapes in other parts of the world, though, have led to established P. monodon populations, such as off West Africa, Brazil, and the Caribbean.

== Habitat ==
P. monodon is suited to inhabit a multitude of environments. They mainly occur in Southeastern Asia, but are widely found. Juveniles of P. monodon are generally found in sandy estuaries and mangroves, and upon adulthood, they move to deeper waters (0–110 m) and live on muddy or rocky bottoms. The P. monodon has shown to be nocturnal in the wild, burrowing into substrate during the day, and coming out at night to feed. P. monodon typically feed on detritus, polychaete worms, mollusks, and small crustaceans. They feed on algae, as well. Due to their nutrient-rich diet, these shrimp are unable to consume phytoplankton because of their feeding appendages, but they are able to consume senescent phytoplankton. They also commence mating at night, and can produce around 800,000 eggs.

== Aquaculture ==
Capture (blue) and aquaculture (green) production of Giant tiger prawn (Penaeus monodon) in thousand tonnes from 1950 to 2022, as reported by the FAO

In the late 1960s Liao I-chiu played an important role in developing methods to farm tiger shrimp. As a result, he is known as the "Father of Shrimp Farming."

P. monodon is the second-most widely cultured prawn species in the world, after only whiteleg shrimp, Litopenaeus vannamei. In 2009, 770,000 tonnes were produced, with a total value of US$3,650,000,000. P. monodon makes up nearly 50% of cultured shrimp alone.

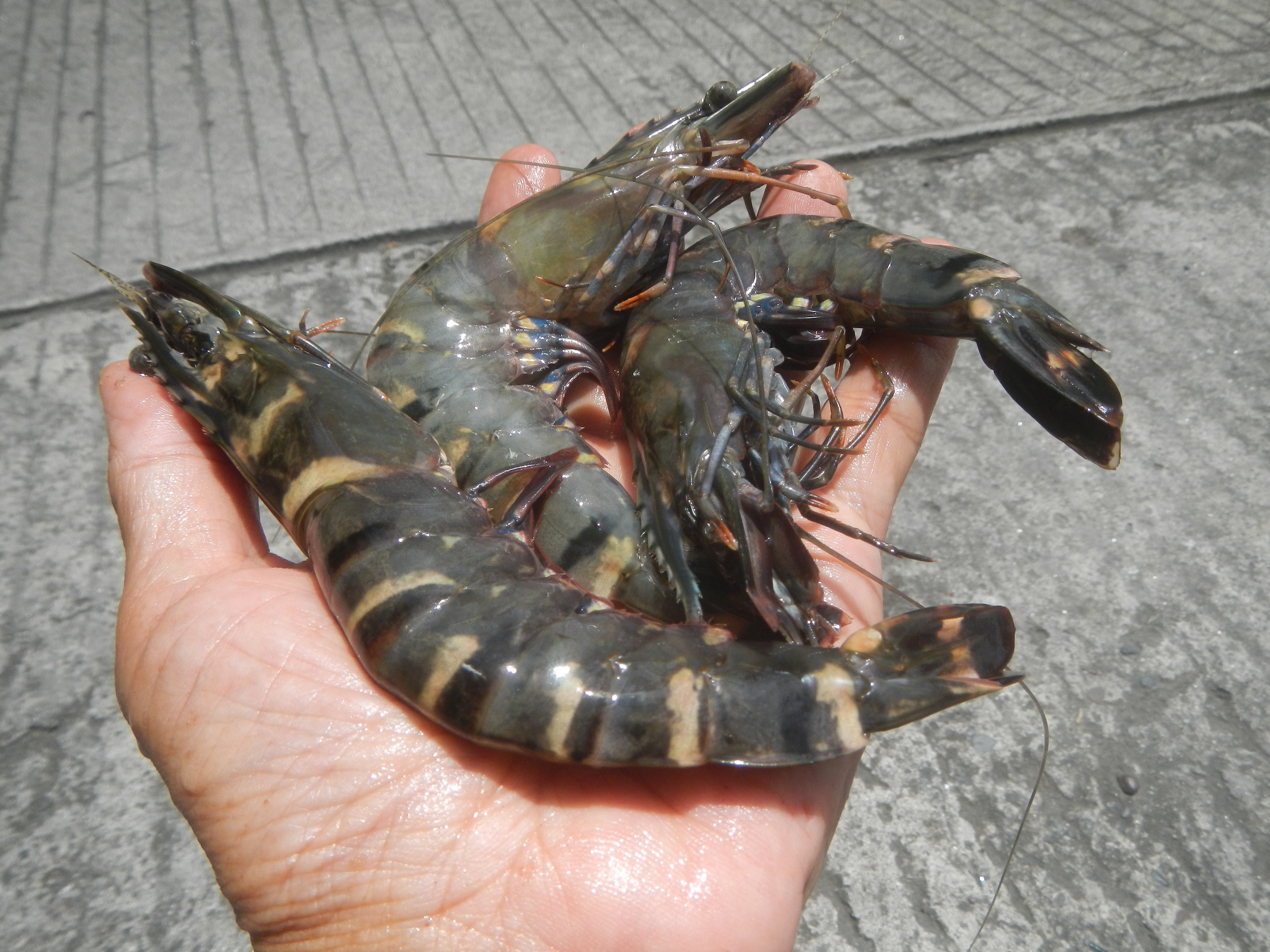

The prawn is popular to culture because of its tolerance to salinity and very quick growth rate, but they are very vulnerable to fungal, viral, and bacterial infections. Diseases such as white spot disease and yellowhead disease have led to a great economic impact in shrimp industries around the globe. They can receive transmitted diseases from other crustaceans such as the Australian red claw crayfish (Cherax quadricarinatus), which is susceptible to yellowhead disease and has shown to transmit it to P. monodon in Thailand.

Black tiger shrimp's susceptibility to many diseases engenders economic constraints towards the black tiger shrimp food industry in Australia, which is farm-raised. To confront such challenges, attempts have been made to selectively breed specific pathogen-resistant lines of the species.

P. monodon has been farmed throughout the world, including West Africa, Hawaii, Tahiti, and England. For optimal growth, P. monodon is raised in waters between 28 and 33 °C. Characteristically for the Penaeus genus, P. monodon has a natural ability to survive and grow in a wide range of salinity, though its optimal salinity is around 15–25 g/L. While in a farm setting, the shrimp are typically fed a compound diet, which is produced in dried pellets. By mixing the diet to have compound feeds and fresh feed, P. monodon was shown to have better reproductive performance.

== Sustainable consumption ==
In 2010, Greenpeace added P. monodon to its seafood red list – "a list of fish that are commonly sold in supermarkets around the world, and which have a very high risk of being sourced from unsustainable fisheries". The reasons given by Greenpeace were "destruction of vast areas of mangroves in several countries, overfishing of juvenile shrimp from the wild to supply farms, and significant human-rights abuses".

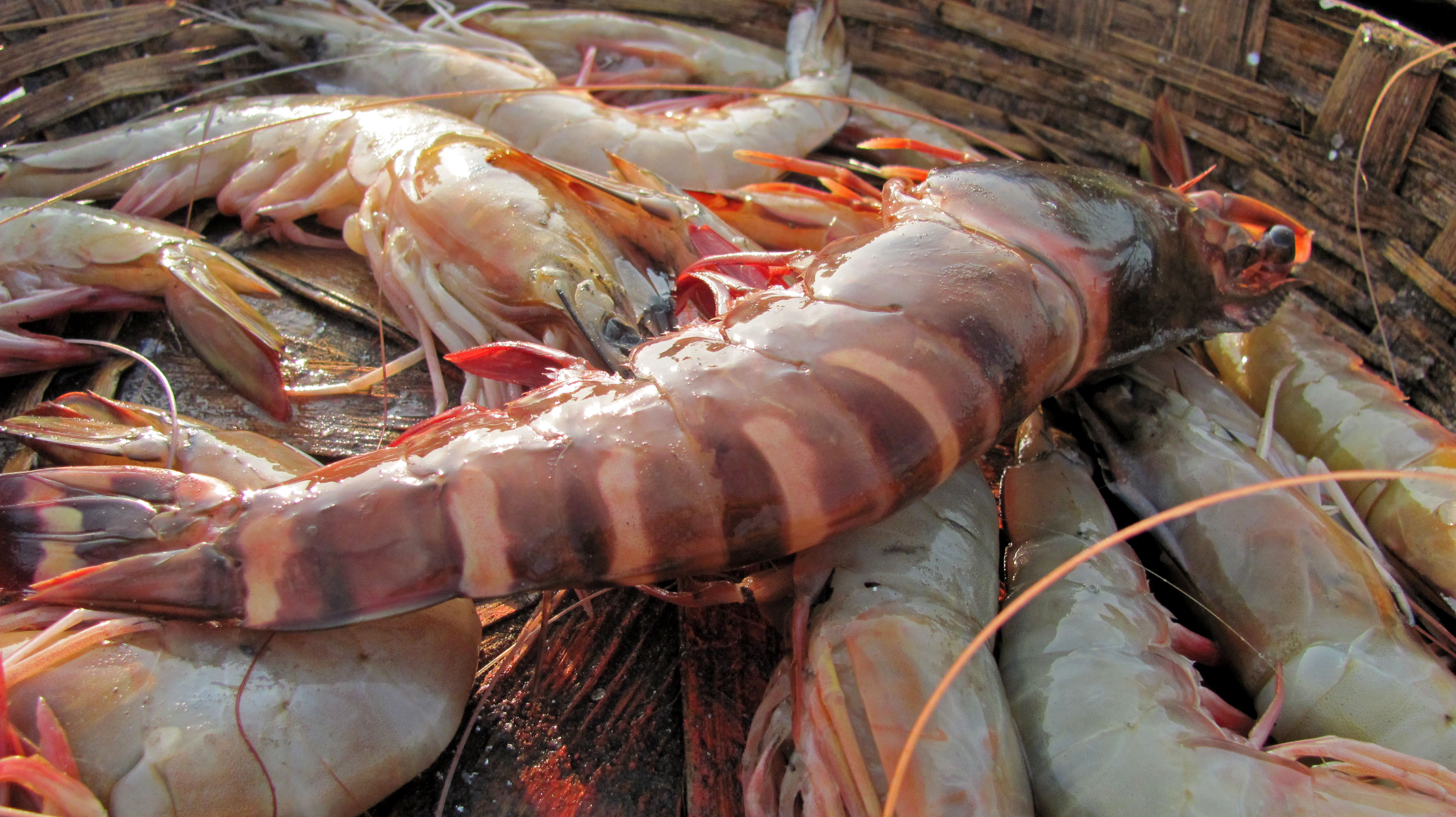

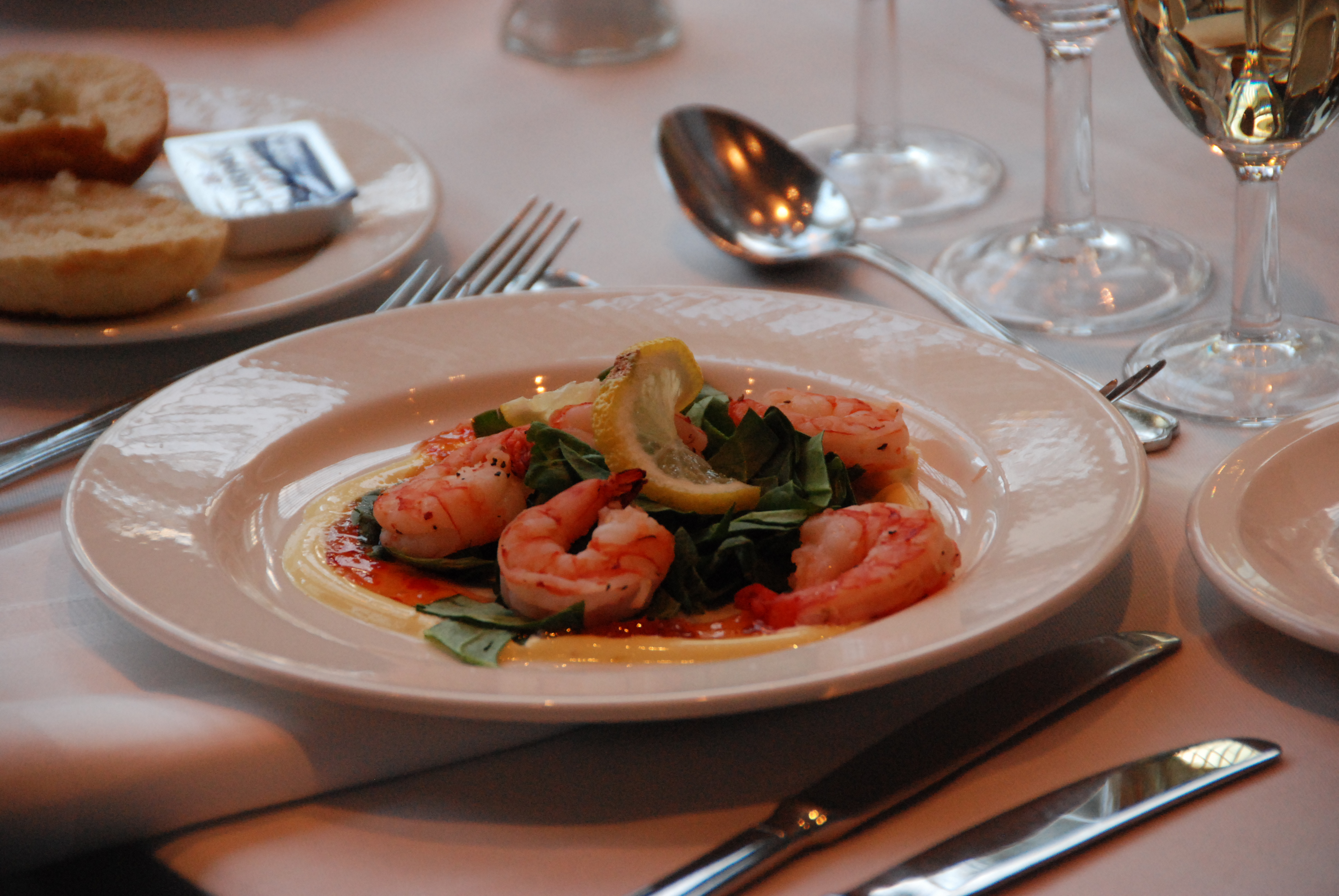
With spinach and saffron cream sauce

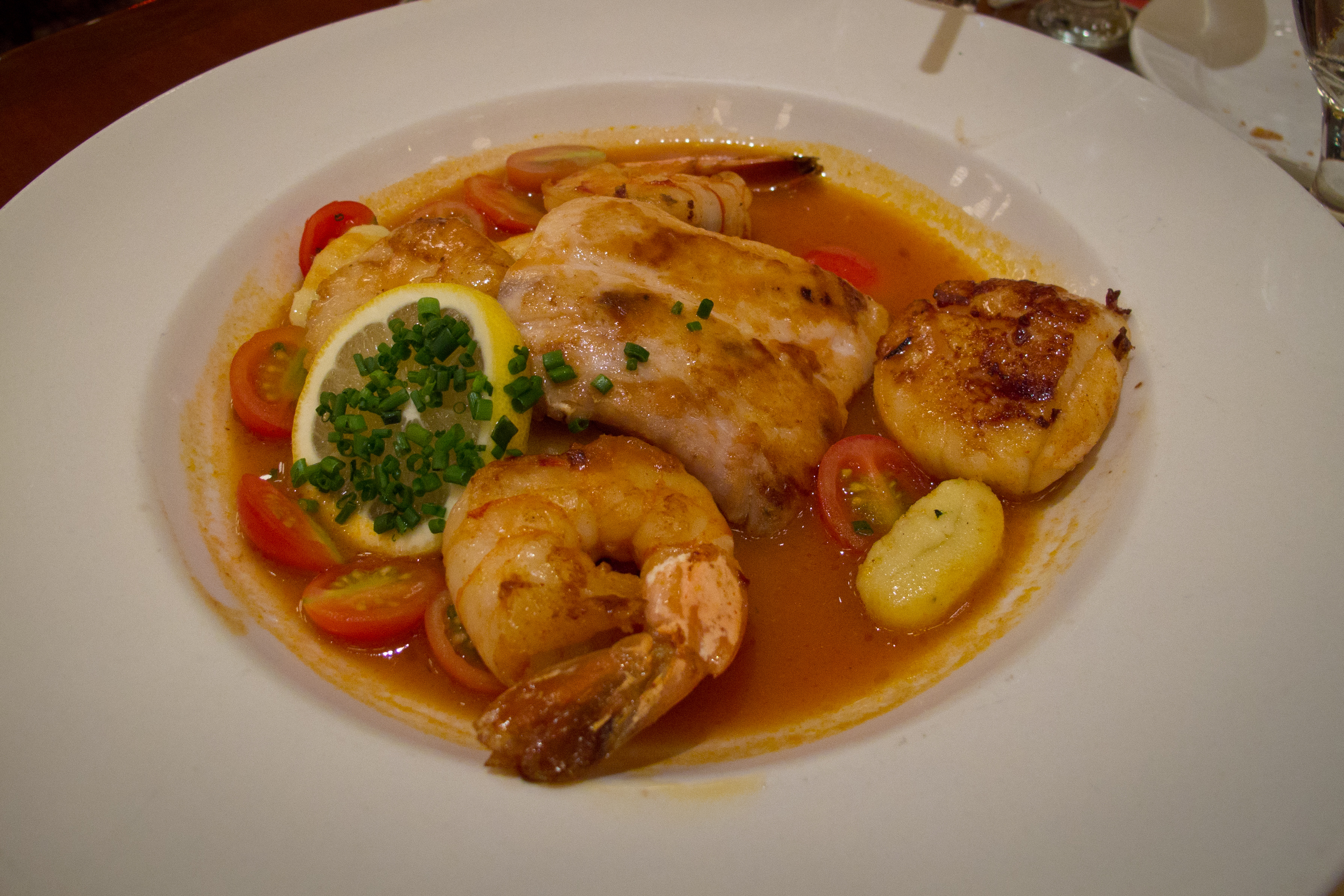
With coulis

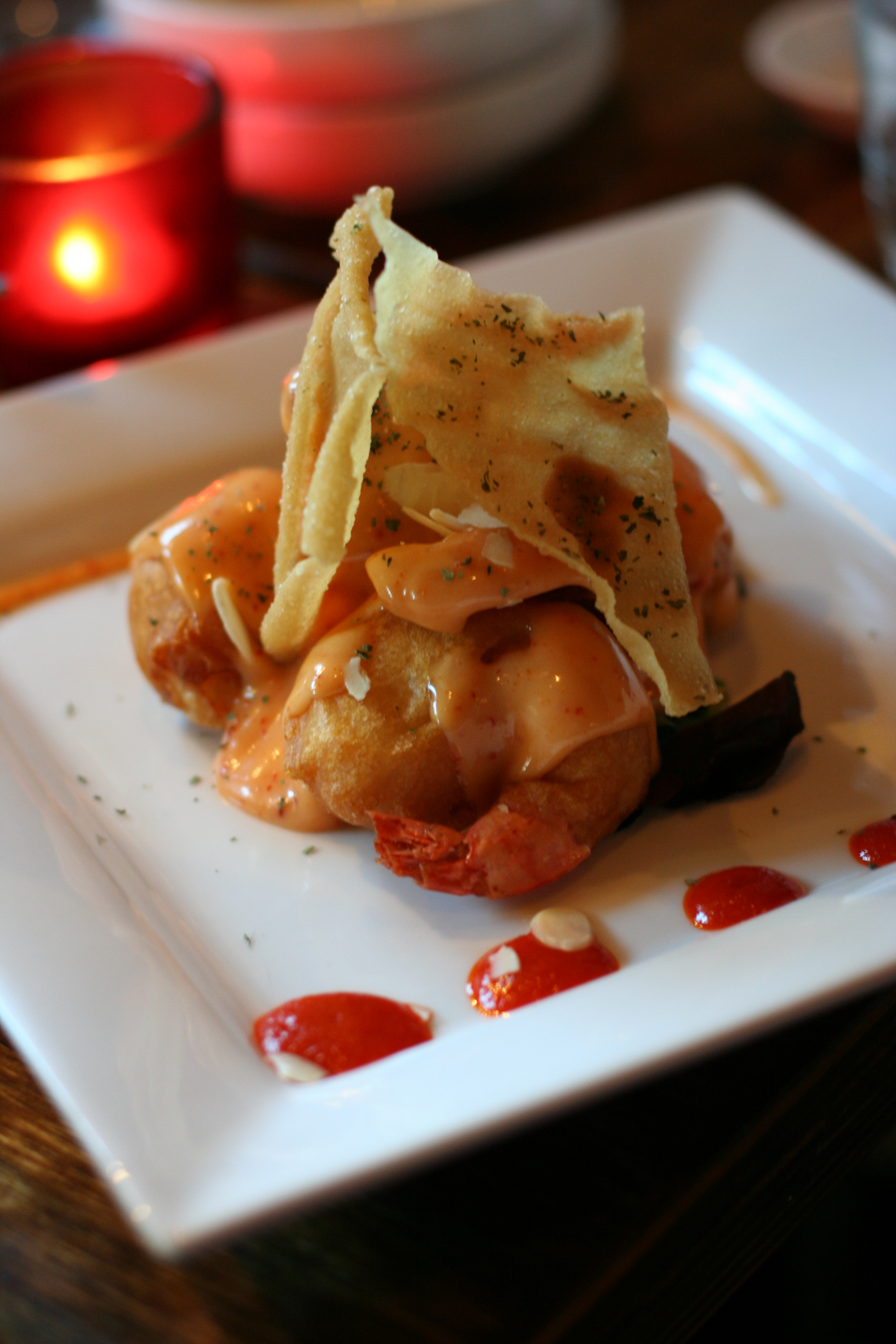
Tempura with wonton chips

== Genetic research ==
In an effort to understand whether DNA repair processes can protect crustaceans against infection, basic research was conducted to elucidate the repair mechanisms used by P. monodon. Repair of DNA double-strand breaks was found to be predominantly carried out by accurate homologous recombinational repair. Another, less accurate process, microhomology-mediated end joining, is also used to repair such breaks.

== See also ==
- Macrobrachium rosenbergii, the giant freshwater prawn
