= Fishing industry in Taiwan =

Overview of fishing in Taiwan

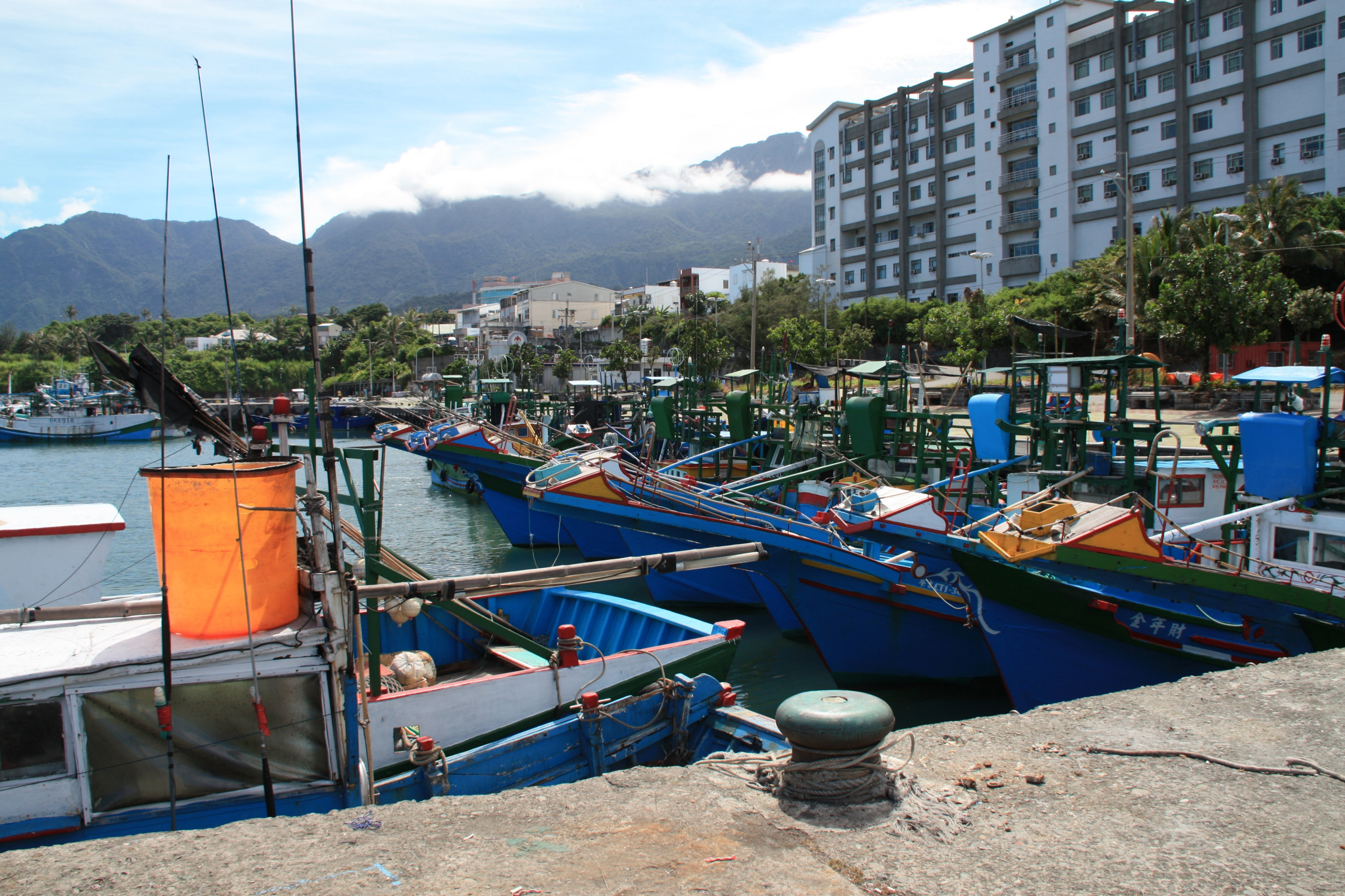
Chenggong Fishing Harbor in 2010

With a coastline of 1566 km, Taiwan is one of the largest fishing nations on earth. Geographically, Taiwan is surrounded by water and lies about 180 kilometres (112 miles) across the Taiwan Strait from the southeastern coast of the Mainland China. The East China Sea is to the north of the island, the Philippine Sea to its east, the Luzon Strait directly to its south, and the South China Sea to its southwest. It also controls a number of smaller islands, including the Penghu archipelago in the Taiwan Strait, Kinmen and Matsu in Fuchien near the Mainland coast, as well as Pratas and Taiping in the South China Sea.

More than one third of the worlds longline tuna fishing vessels are operated by Taiwanese companies with the total strength of the distant waters fishing fleet at more than 2,000 vessels. Taiwanese conglomerate FCF Co, Ltd. is one of the largest tuna traders in the world moving more than half million tons a year, in 2019 they acquired American company Bumble Bee Foods for close to 1 billion dollars. Taiwan's ocean fisheries employs roughly 350,000 people and there are 130,000 fishing households in Taiwan. The Taiwanese fishing industry was estimated to be worth approximately two billion dollars in 2019, and the seafood industry to be worth 1.3 billion dollars a year in 2020.

== Types of fisheries ==
=== Aquaculture ===
Aquaculture has been in use in Taiwan for many years. Aquaculture fisheries were first developed in Taiwan during the late Ming Dynasty (1661–1683), when fishermen along the coast of Taiwan used fishponds to raise saltwater milkfish. Later, other species were introduced, and the sector expanded upon. Taiwanese aquaculture was at its height in the 1980s. However, too many fish farms resulted in environmental damage, and the structure shifted from freshwater to saltwater aquaculture. In 2010, Taiwan’s aquaculture output was approximately 310,000 metric tons and was primarily sourced from land-based fishponds.

=== Coastal and offshore fishing ===
Taiwan is located in the Pacific Ocean and has high marine biodiversity. The waters in Northern Taiwan receive a large amount of nutrients which leads to high biodiversity due to meeting currents. Taiwan’s coastal and offshore fisheries had high production especially in the 1980’s, but they only provided 24% of fish and seafood caught by Taiwan in 2017. Some of the main threats to Taiwanese fishing waters are illegal, unreported and unregulated fishing (IUU) done by China, overfishing, and abandoned fishing nets known as ghost nets.

Bottom trawling is a popular type of coastal and off-shore fishing and brings in 13% of Taiwan’s overall near-shore catch, and in 2023, Taiwan had 1,324 ships that bottom trawl. Taiwan has a multitude of rules regulating the coastal and offshore fishing, including for bottom trawlers. Bottom trawlers with a tonnage under 50 are restricted from trawling within 5km of shore and those over 50 tons are restricted from trawling within 12km of shore.

=== Distant water fishing ===
Taiwan has the world's second largest distant-water fishing fleet with 1,100 vessels flagged in or directly owned by Taiwan. The distant waters fleet brings in most of the fish caught by Taiwan, and the Taiwanese government heavily subsidises the distant waters fishing industry. These vessels employ at least 35,000 migrant sailors primarily from Indonesia and the Philippines.

The main catch is tuna, and more than one third of the world's longline tuna fishing vessels are operated by Taiwanese companies. Besides tuna, saury and squid are also objects of interest for Taiwan’s distant water fishing. In 2021, Taiwan caught 30k metric tonnes of saury in 2021 and 40k metric tonnes in 2022. Boats in the saury and squid fisheries have been transitioning from incandescent and high-intensity discharge (HID) light bulbs to light emitting diodes (LED) which allows them for an environmental impact reduction.

=== Whaling and whale watching ===
Commercial whaling was introduced by Japanese colonialists in 1913 and continued under Japanese control during World War Two. The practice was restarted by Kuomintang authorities in 1955. It was eventually outlawed in 1981 under significant international pressure. The whaling industry historically centred on Hengchun, the southernmost township in Taiwan. After the cessation of whaling, a whale watching industry developed.

=== Export ===
Around 90% of the tuna caught by Taiwan is exported, mainly for canned tuna to the US and Europe and as frozen tuna to Japan.

== Blue Crime ==
=== Overfishing and the environment ===
All Taiwan’s major sources of fishing have a negative environmental impact. Bottom trawling, which is mainly done in coastal and offshore fishing, is controversial due to the environmental damage it causes. It brings in a lot of bycatch, it harms the seabed, and it ruins the habitats for fish and corals.

While aquaculture do not bring the same issues as bottom trawling, too many aquaculture farms have resulted in environmental damage such as water and soil pollution.

Despite the fact that the majority of distant water fishing vessels are properly authorised, many have been found to underreport their catch. This is a serious problem, as it represents both an environmental issue and is a type of IUU fishing. On the environmental side, underreporting the number of fish caught contributes to overfishing and makes monitoring of fish stocks almost impossible. This is often done by Taiwanese fishing companies using flags of convenience to obscure vessel ownership as well as through unreported at sea transfers of fish. While governments worldwide have introduced measures to sustainably manage the fishing industry, many of these have failed, in part due to underreporting the catch. When a vessel underreports its catch, it is often a sign of other issues being present as well, such as the fish having been caught in contested waters or waters belonging to other nations, or there having been labour violations in the fishing process.

=== Labour violations ===
Taiwan's overseas fishing fleet has been criticised for a history of abuse and a lack of protection for its workers, who to a large degree are migrant labourers, often from the Philippines, Indonesia and China. Indonesian fishers make up more than 60% of the workforce on Taiwanese distant water ships. Official Taiwanese sources put the number of foreign workers aboard Taiwanese vessels at 26,000 but NGOs and US government agencies put the figure around 160,000 in 2015. Foreign fishermen frequently report not being paid, long work hours, and verbal and physical abuse at the hands of their captains and officers, who are often Taiwanese.

Labour rights violations are a frequent issue in the fishing industry, as one of the easiest ways for fishers to cut costs is by reducing costs related to labour This problem is biggest in distant-water fleets. As ships can remain at sea for months, labour conditions can be very difficult to monitor, leading to many cases of forced labour. Additionally, because of jurisdictional complexities, it is often unclear which country a crewmember can seek help in.

A 2020 Greenpeace investigation found Taiwanese fishing vessels in the Atlantic Ocean engaged in illegal, unreported and unregulated fishing. They also found significant evidence of the abuse of foreign labourers. Taiwanese tuna conglomerate FCF Co, Ltd. was specifically singled out for criticism for links to illegal fishing and forced labour. In 2022, nine Taiwanese captains were indicted for the abuse of migrant labourers on distant waters fishing vessels.

In recent years, Taiwan has made significant progress on the issue of labour violations, but abuse remains widespread. The distant waters fishing fleet lags far behind the rest of Taiwanese industry. Part of the reason for this is that regulation of distant waters fisheries is challenging, because the large number of jurisdictions involved means that efforts have to be multinational. After receiving international pressure regarding human rights considerations, in April 2022, the minimum wage for labourers aboard Taiwanese distant waters fishing vessels was raised in addition to new requirements being put in place concerning direct payment of wages and provision of health insurance. The wage increase was implemented in July 2022. In August 2024, ten Indonesian migrant fishermen filed a lawsuit based on severe labour rights violations such as months of unpaid wages, verbal abuse and poor living conditions. Most recently, American company Bumble Bee, owned by Taiwanese tuna trader FCF Co., Ltd that has earlier received criticism for forced labour, was sued by Indonesian workers for labour violations in early 2025. Bumble Bee itself has also previously been linked to Taiwanese fish caught with forced labour.

=== International warnings ===
As Taiwan exports large parts of its fish catches, it has gotten into international trouble regarding IUU practices and labour abuses in especially its distant water fishing. This has resulted in several sanctions.

In 2005, Taiwan received serious sanctions by the International Commission for the Conservation of Atlantic Tunas for illegal “fish laundering” activities after IUU fishing activities were discovered. These sanctions were lifted in 2006 after they made reforms to better their fishing systems.

On October 1st, 2015, they received a “yellow card” from the European Commission as they did not comply with the EU Regulation on combatting IUU fishing. This yellow card was followed by sanctions that were lifted in 2019 after the Taiwanese government made improvements by addressing issues such as monitoring and traceability of its distant-waters fishing.

In October 2020, the US Department of Labor added the Taiwanese distant waters fleet's products to its list of goods produced by child or forced labour. In May 2021, the Taiwanese auditing and ombudsman authority called the Control Yuan, ordered the Ministry of Foreign Affairs, the Ministry of Labor, and the Fisheries Agency to address the issue and heavily criticized their lack of action. In September 2024, Taiwan was on the US list for the third time.

== International cooperation ==
Taiwan’s complicated political status makes it difficult to fully settle disputed maritime boundaries. Generally speaking, Taiwan’s relations are influenced by the fact that while most countries acknowledges the One China principle which regards Taiwan as part of a China led by Beijing, they do still treat Taiwan as somewhat sovereign. This has sparked critique from mainland China. However, Taiwan has fishing agreements with multiple countries in the South China Sea region.

=== China ===
China's relationship with Taiwan is complicated. Because China views Taiwan as being part of China, China treats Taiwan’s fishing industry as its own. However, China does discourage any actions that can be viewed as acknowledging Taiwan as being independent, such as Taiwan entering into an agreement on a state-to-state basis or becoming a member of a regional fisheries management organisation.

In 2009, China and Taiwan signed two fisheries agreements, one which focused on fishing crews and provided rules for accidents and labour disputes on Taiwanese fishing vessels crewed by people from mainland China, and one which addressed maritime crime in the Taiwan strait and mutual judicial assistance in the criminal justice process.

=== Japan ===
Japan and Taiwan have overlapping claims to their surrounding seas. In 2013, Taiwan and Japan entered into an agreement that had been 17 years in the making. The agreement gives Taiwanese fishing vessels access to 4,530 square kilometres (1,750 square miles) of previously contested fishing grounds. The response to this agreement was mixed, with China being concerned about this intruding on its sovereignty claims on Taiwan, but the international community greeted it positively as a constructive model to peacefully manage resources in disputed waters. Both Japan and Taiwan has since institutionalised the agreement in domestic regulations and have met regularly to amend rules.

=== The Philippines ===
Overlapping claims to the water around Taiwan and the Philippines have led to tensions. In 2013, the Philippine Coast Guard opened fire on a Taiwanese fishing vessel fishing in disputed waters between the two countries in what has been known as the Guang Da Xing No. 28 incident, killing one of the Taiwanese fishers. Following this event, a fishing agreement between the two countries was negotiated and agreed on in 2015 to avoid further conflicts. This agreement focuses on avoiding the use of violence or unnecessary force, establishing an emergency notification system so the other party is notified one hour before action is taken against a ship believed to operate illegally. Likewise, a mechanism for the prompt release of detained crew and vessels within three days was established.

=== The UN ===
Despite being a founding member of the UN, Taiwan has not been a part of the UN since 1971, when UN Resolution 2758 was agreed on with the goal to expel the representatives of Taiwanese leader Chiang Kai-shek from "the place which they unlawfully occupy at the United Nations and in all the organisations related to it”. Taiwan's seat was then given to the People’s Republic of China. This was the result of many years of lobbying from the People’s Republic of China. Despite many attempts to get included again, Taiwan has remained out of the UN since due to the one China argument.

This exclusion of the UN also includes exclusion of UN bodies and agreements, including the 1995 United Nations Fish Stocks Agreement. Although the international community does not treat Taiwan as a sovereign state that can be a member of international governmental organisations that require statehood for membership, this exclusion is to some degree circumvented. The inclusion of Taiwan in fishing-related issues in the region is seen as necessary, and Taiwan has therefore been included in creative ways that skirt the issue of Taiwan’s political status, e.g. by welcoming “invited experts” from Taiwan to participate in their personal capacities. Similarly, in international treaties, Taiwan is often mentioned as a ‘fishing entity’, which allows it to participate to some degree.

=== Combatting blue crime ===
Due to the geographical placement of Taiwan, its fishing vessels operate in many areas that are disputed waters that more than one country claims ownership of. This leads to a lack of coordinated and sustainable management of the fisheries, making it easier for fishers to violate the laws. This has also led to clashes at sea between fishing vessels and maritime law enforcements. Taiwan does cooperate with the United States to specifically reduce illegal, unreported and unregulated fishing.

== See also ==
- Aquaculture in Taiwan
- Maritime industries of Taiwan
- Coast Guard Administration (Taiwan)
- Taiwanese cuisine
- Hunting in Taiwan
