= Ding-Shinn Chen =

Taiwanese physician and hepatologist (1943–2020)

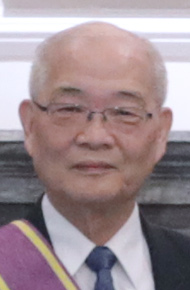

Ding-Shinn Chen (Chinese: 陳定信; pinyin: Chén Dìngxìn; 6 July 1943 – 24 June 2020) was a Taiwanese hepatologist.

== Life and career ==
He was born on 6 July 1943, in what became Yingge District, New Taipei City. Chen's mother became sick when he was a child, and needed surgical intervention. As such, Chen was around medical professionals at a young age, which sparked his interest in the field. Upon high school graduation, Chen was accepted into the National Taiwan University College of Medicine. During his fourth year of medical school, Chen's father died of liver cancer, inspiring him to study hepatology. He completed medical studies in 1968. Chen became a resident at National Taiwan University Hospital and later joined the NTU medical faculty, working closely with Sung Juei-low. Chen and Sung advocated for widespread preventative measures against hepatitis B, resulting in the establishment of a mass vaccination program in 1984. Chen specialized in liver disease research, namely hepatitis. His research earned Chen the nickname Liver King (肝帝; gāndì), which, pronounced in Mandarin, is homophonous to Gandhi.

In 1991, Chen was elected a member of Academia Sinica. In 2001 he was appointed dean of NTU's College of Medicine. That same year, he became a fellow of The World Academy of Sciences. In 2002, Chen traveled to Malawi to deliver medical textbooks. During the 2003 SARS outbreak, Chen worked closely with Michael M. C. Lai on research into vaccinations against the disease. In 2005, Chen was elected a foreign associate of the United States National Academy of Sciences. Chen stepped down as dean in 2007. He was the 2009 recipient of the International Recognition Award presented by the European Association for the Study of the Liver. Chen won the 2010 Nikkei Asia Prize in science and technology. In 2012, Chen spoke in support of decriminalizing medical malpractice. He favored granting Chen Shui-bian medical parole in 2014. In 2018, Chen was awarded Order of Brilliant Star with Grand Cordon. That same year, Chen received the Baruch S. Blumberg Prize from the Hepatitis B Foundation.

Chen died at the National Taiwan University Hospital on 24 June 2020 from pancreatic cancer, aged 76.
