= Michael M. C. Lai =

Taiwanese virologist (born 1942)

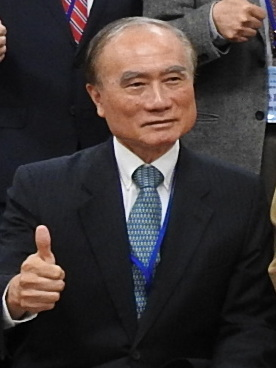
Image of Michael M. C. Lai

Michael Ming-Chiao Lai (Chinese: 賴明詔; pinyin: Lài Míngzhào; born 8 September 1942) is a Taiwanese virologist.

== Background and education ==
A native of Tainan born on 8 September 1942, Lai graduated from National Tainan First Senior High School and studied medicine at National Taiwan University.

== Career ==
After completing his doctorate at the University of California, Berkeley in 1973, Lai joined the University of Southern California faculty, where he remained until 2003. While teaching at USC, Lai was elected a member of Academia Sinica in 1992 and a fellow of the American College of Microbiology in 2002. From 1990, Lai was a Howard Hughes Medical Investigator. Upon his return to Taiwan in 2003, Lai was named a distinguished fellow of Academia Sinica. He became a fellow of The World Academy of Sciences in 2006. In 2009, Lai received a Lifetime Achievement Award from the Society of Chinese Bioscientists in America. The government of Taiwan awarded Lai Presidential Science Prize in 2013. He won the Nikkei Asia Prize in science and technology in 2017.

Lai specialized in coronavirus, the species of virus that causes severe acute respiratory syndrome. His work has led to acknowledgement of Lai as "father of coronavirus research." He returned to Taiwan in the midst of the 2003 SARS outbreak, and began researching vaccinations against the disease with the help of Ding-Shinn Chen. Lai succeeded Sunney Chan as vice president of Academia Sinica in July 2003. He stepped down from Academia Sinica in 2006, and began his tenure as president of National Cheng Kung University the next year. During his tenure, the institution began partnering with IBM Taiwan on nanotechnology research. Thirteen of the university's departments were placed on a watchlist compiled by the Higher Education Evaluation and Accreditation Council of Taiwan in 2009. Later that year, researchers at NCKU piloted the first unmanned aerial vehicle flight across the Taiwan Strait. Lai was supportive of government proposals to permit Chinese students to study at Taiwanese universities and backed efforts to retain top academics. In 2010, NCKU established an English-language medical program. Later that year, The Small Medicine and Advanced Research Translation team at Institute of Oral Medicine, affiliated with NCKU announced new developments in gene manipulation techniques using Artificial Targeting Light Activated Nano Scissors. After yielding the NCKU presidency to Hwung Hwung-hweng in 2011, Lai was named distinguished professor in 2013. Lai researched the H7N9 virus soon after cases were reported in China in 2013. In 2018, he became a laureate of the Asian Scientist 100 by the Asian Scientist.
