= Fremantle Octopus =

Australian seafood company

- Industry: Fishing
- Founder: Craig Cammilleri, Ross Cammilleri
- Headquarters: Fremantle, Western Australia
- Products: Octopus
- Website: https://www.fremantleoctopus.cm.au/

Fremantle Octopus is an Australian octopus fishery business based in Fremantle, Western Australia. It was founded by former rock lobster fishermen Ros and Craig Cammilleri.

The company catches and processes Octopus djinda. (Note: Sources from 2018 state that the species caught is named Octopus tetricus. Octopus from southwest Australia was once regarded as being conspecific to tetricus; however in 2021 it was reclassified as a separate species; Octopus djinda) The species of octopus is regarded as having a relatively high grade based on size, texture, and taste; thought in part to be a result of its natural diet in the local environment. Products made by the fishery include frozen raw tentacles, steamed tentacles, and marinated octopus.

The business processes octopus catch from various independently owned boats, and has a processing plant in the suburb of O'Connor. The business' founder Craig Cammilleri has been credited as the inventor of the 'octopus trigger trap', a method for catching octopus that uses a plastic grab with an in-built LED light to lure octopus. Baby octopus and fish are not strong enough to trigger the trap.

The business operates in a fishery with Marine Stewardship Council certification, one of only two octopus fisheries in the world where that is the case. The total catch of Octopus djinda in WA is around 300 tonnes per year, of which Fremantle Octopus processes around 70%. Estimates have placed the sustainable catch rate for the fishery at around 1-2 thousand tonnes per year. Prior to being a valuable commodity, octopus were an annoyance for rock lobster fisherman as a predator of their catch.

Around 80% of the fishery's catch is sold domestically in Australia, with 20% exported to foreign markets including the US, Singapore, Hong Kong and Dubai. In 2019 the business expanded its exports to the Chinese market.

In 2017 the company explored a float on the ASX.
