= Two-spot octopus =

Two-spot octopus may refer to:

- Octopus bimaculatus, also known as Verill's two-spot octopus
- Octopus bimaculoides, also known as the California two-spot octopus
