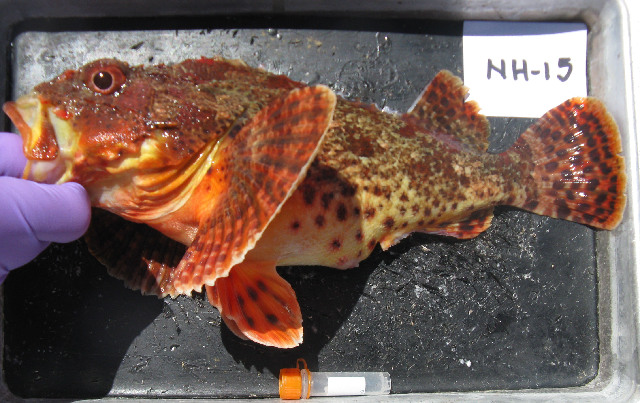

Conservation status
- Data Deficient (IUCN 3.1)

Scientific classification
- Kingdom: Animalia
- Phylum: Chordata
- Class: Actinopterygii
- Division: Teleostei
- Order: Perciformes
- Family: Scorpaenidae
- Genus: Scorpaena
- Species: S. guttata

Binomial name
- Scorpaena guttata Girard, 1854

Synonyms
- Scorpaena guadalupae Fowler, 1944; Scorpaena microlepis Gunter, 1948

= Scorpaena guttata =

Species of fish

Scorpaena guttata is a species of fish in the scorpionfish family known by the common name California scorpionfish. It is native to the eastern Pacific Ocean, where it can be found along the coast of California and Baja California. Its distribution extends from around Santa Cruz, California, to Punta Abreojos in Baja California Sur, and out to Guadalupe Island. It is also found in the Gulf of California. Another common name is spotted scorpionfish.

== Taxonomy ==
Scorpaena guttata was first formally described in 1854 by the French biologist Charles Frédéric Girard with the type locality given as Monterey, California. The specific name guttata means "spotted", an allusion to the many small black spots on the head and body and the larger black spots on the fins.

== Description ==
This fish reaches up to 43 to 47 cm (17 to 19 in) in length. It is reddish brown in color with many brown and black spots, especially on the fins. The head is spiny. It does not have a swim bladder; it spends most of its time on the ocean floor.

== Distribution and habitat ==
Scorpaena guttata is found in the eastern Pacific Ocean where it occurs from Santa Cruz in central California south along the coast of Baja California to Todos Santos, Baja California Sur with a small isolated population reportedly resident in the northern Sea of Cortez.

This is a demersal marine fish which may venture to ocean depths up to 183 metres (600 ft), but it is usually in shallower waters, up to about 30 metres (98 ft). It is found along rocky bottoms just offshore or in bays. It inhabits underwater caves. It does not necessarily stay in one territory; mark and recapture experiments observed individuals traveling up to 200 kilometres (120 mi), with one moving from near Santa Cruz Island in the Channel Islands to Long Beach over the course of about 14 months. Another fish traveled at a speed of about 2.2 kilometres (1.4 mi) per day.

== Biology ==
Its maximum recorded life span is 21 years.

The diet of this carnivorous fish includes other fish, crustaceans, octopuses, and squid. Juvenile crabs are strongly favored, especially during fall and winter, when they make up the bulk of the diet. The juvenile yellow rock crab (Metacarcinus anthonyi) is a very common prey. Another common crustacean prey item is the ridgeback prawn (Sicyonia ingentis). Fish species consumed include Californian anchovy (Engraulis mordax) and spotted cusk-eel (Chilara taylori).

The fish may return to the same spawning grounds each breeding season. When it spawns it produces an elastic, gelatinous, balloon-like mass about 25 centimeters long. The eggs are encased in one internal layer of the mass. The mass floats on the ocean surface. Initially colorless and transparent, the mass eventually turns cloudy white as it floats. Each egg is just over a millimeter long. Spawning likely takes place around dawn; the fish has been observed congregating daily at this time at the surface of the water during the breeding season. Mating is polygamous.

== Toxicity ==
Like many other scorpionfish, this species has venom in its spines. Once called "one of the most noxious marine animals in California waters," this fish has been responsible for many human injuries. Fishermen are often affected when trying to remove the fish from the hook; when pulled from the water, the fish flares the spines on its fins and gill covers, making it difficult to handle. The spines themselves are sharp enough to inflict wounds, but the venom can cause a number of additional symptoms. The effects of the sting are said to feel much like those of a rattlesnake bite. A spine prick to the finger was reported to cause a severe, throbbing pain and cyanosis of the digit, which became swollen and hard, then hot and red, then numb. Pain traveled up the arm to the axilla, which developed painful masses. Systemic symptoms included nausea and a feeling of faintness, and the skin was cool, clammy, and pale. In two weeks the victim had recovered. Another victim developed pericarditis from an envenomation.

Each spine has two longitudinal grooves which are filled with epithelial tissue that contains venom-secreting glands. The spine is sheathed in a thin membrane. As the spine enters the victim, the membrane sheath is pushed back, helping to inject the venom into the victim.

The venom is cardiotoxic, in laboratory studies producing fluctuations in blood pressure and EKG changes such as ventricular tachycardia and bundle branch block.

== Ecology ==
This fish species is host to a number of parasites, such as the copepods Bomolochus spinulus, Lepeophtheirus rotundipes, Naobranchia scorpaenae, Pseudodiocus scorpaenus, Hamaticolax spinulus, and Chondracanthus gracilis.

Predators of the fish include the California two-spot octopus (Octopus bimaculatus), which is apparently rarely injured by the spines because its flesh is so pliable. On the other hand, the fish will eat small individuals of this octopus, as well.

== Conservation ==
Sport fishing puts some pressure on this species, as it is considered to be a very good food fish once the spines have been avoided. There is a small commercial fishery, as well. The catch is sold to fish processors and to the public; it is sought after in some Asian communities in Southern California. The fish is caught by angling, gillnetting, and otter trawling. The extent of the impact of fishing on populations is unknown.

There are no major threats. The populations off of Southern California apparently undergo short-term fluctuations in size, and it is considered to be a rare species overall along the California coast.
