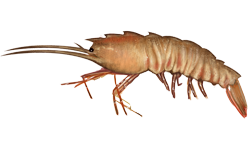

Scientific classification
- Kingdom: Animalia
- Phylum: Arthropoda
- Clade: Pancrustacea
- Class: Malacostraca
- Order: Decapoda
- Suborder: Dendrobranchiata
- Family: Sicyoniidae
- Genus: Sicyonia
- Species: S. brevirostris

Binomial name
- Sicyonia brevirostris Stimpson, 1871

Synonyms
- Eusicyonia brevirostris Burkenroad, 1934

= Sicyonia brevirostris =

Species of crustacean

Sicyonia brevirostris, the brown rock shrimp, is a species of prawn. It is found along the coasts of the western Atlantic Ocean and Gulf of Mexico from Norfolk, Virginia to Yucatán, including Cuba and the Bahamas. It is used in cooking and has a taste and texture similar to lobster.

== Appearance ==
It appears off-white to pinkish in color with the back surface darker and blotched or barred with lighter shades. Their legs are red to reddish-purple and barred with white. The abdomen has deep transverse grooves and numerous nodules. Short hairs cover their bodies and appendages. Their eyes are large and deeply pigmented.

== Biology ==
Brown rock shrimp's growth and development depends on factors such as water temperature and salinity. They can grow up to 6 inches (15 cm) in length, but most brown rock shrimp found in shallow waters are less than 2 in (5.1 cm) long. They are highly productive and have a short life span, between 20 and 22 months.

Females are able to reproduce when they reach at least 1/2 to 1 in (1.3 to 2.5 cm) in length. Males mature when they reach about 1/2 in (1.3 cm) long. Brown rock shrimp spawn year-round in offshore waters, with peaks between November and January. Individual females can spawn three or more times in one season. Males and females mate, and the eggs are fertilized when the female simultaneously releases egg and sperm. Eggs hatch within 24 hours.

Juvenile and adult brown rock shrimp feed on the ocean floor, mainly eating small bivalve mollusks and crustaceans.

Sheepshead, minnows, water boatmen, and insect larvae eat post-larval brown rock shrimp. A wide variety of species prey on juvenile and adult brown rock shrimp.

== Habitat ==
Brown rock shrimp are found from Norfolk, Virginia, south through the Gulf of Mexico to Mexico's Yucatan Peninsula.

== Management ==
NOAA Fisheries and the South Atlantic Fishery Management Council manage the brown rock shrimp fishery. Brown rock shrimp are occasionally caught in the Gulf of Mexico but not in quantities large enough to warrant specific management measures.

== Status ==
According to the 2018 stock assessment, the brown rock shrimp is not subject to overfishing. There is currently not enough information to determine the population size, so it is unknown.

Brown rock shrimp are highly productive. Their population size varies naturally from year to year based on environmental conditions.

== Other references ==
- Rock shrimp NOAA FishWatch. Retrieved 4 November 2012.
