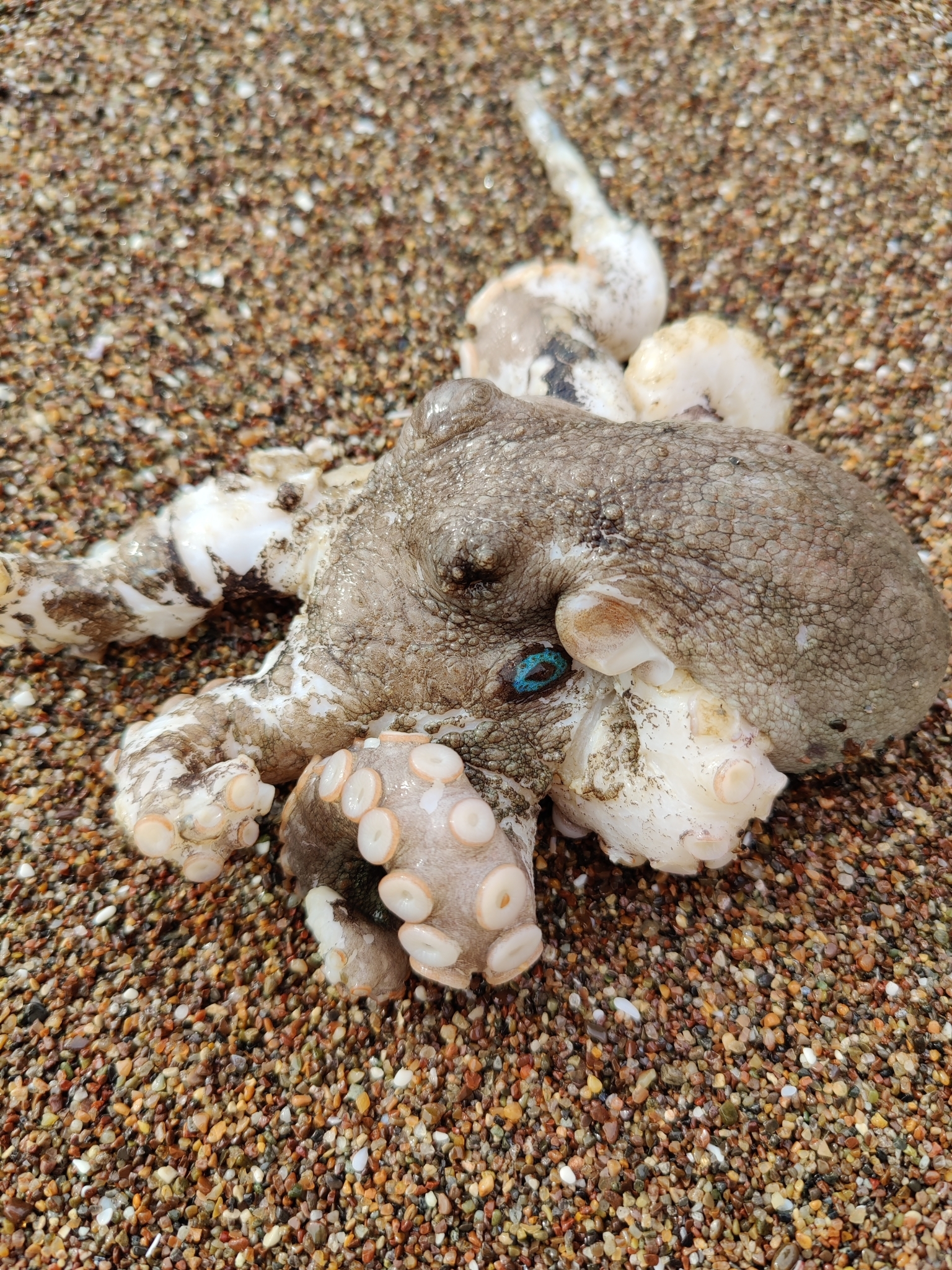
- Cayucos, California, 2021

Conservation status
- Least Concern (IUCN 3.1)

Scientific classification
- Kingdom: Animalia
- Phylum: Mollusca
- Class: Cephalopoda
- Order: Octopoda
- Family: Octopodidae
- Genus: Octopus
- Species: O. bimaculatus

Binomial name
- Octopus bimaculatus Verrill, 1883

= Octopus bimaculatus =

Verrill's two-spot octopus

Species of octopus

Octopus bimaculatus, commonly referred to as Verrill's two-spot octopus, is a similar species to the California two-spot octopus (Octopus bimaculoides), which it is often mistaken for. The two can be distinguished by the difference in the blue and black chain-like pattern of the ocelli. O. bimaculatus hunt and feed on a diverse number of benthic organisms that also reside off the coast of Southern California. Once the octopus reaches sexual maturity, it shortly dies after mating, which is approximately 12–18 months after hatching. Embryonic development tends to be rapid due to this short lifespan of these organisms.

== Description ==
Octopus bimaculatus is typically light brown and spotted in color with a distinctive blue and black false eye, or ocellus, under each eye. The mantle, including the beak and mouth, is located at the center of eight arms. Each of the arms is lined with suckers that are used to help with grasping prey, rocks, and forming shelters.

Similar to other octopus species, O. bimaculatus has skin covered in chromatophores. During the post-larval stage, there are only a few chromatophores and they are called the "founder chromatophores". However, as the octopus matures, more chromatophores form and cover the skin. These chromatophores are pigments that the octopus can expand to create large disc of color that can blend in with the surrounding environment. This is an important behavior that can be used in both defense against predators or to remain hidden from prey before an ambush attack.

Fully mature octopus grow to be about 47 centimeters (18 inches) long.

=== Distinctive features ===
O. bimaculatus gets its name "two-spotted octopus" from the blue and black ocelli under each eye. One potential function of these bright blue ocelli is to allow the octopus to appear as a different animal with large eyes as it swims swiftly through the water.

O. bimaculatus is often confused with the California two-spot octopus (Octopus bimaculoides) as both species have two distinctive black and blue ocelli beneath the eyes and above the arms. There are a few key features for telling the two species apart. The blue ring of the ocelli for O. bimaculatus does not have the same distinctive chain-like pattern that O. bimaculoides has. For O. bimaculatus the pattern is still chain-like but more irregular, asymmetrical, and disproportionate, while for O. bimaculoides, the chain-like pattern is more symmetrical and orderly.

The two species also lay eggs of sizes. O. bimaculatus eggs are much smaller and hatch into planktonic larvae, while O. bimaculoides lays larger eggs that produce benthic young. Additionally, O. bimaculatus is generally the larger of the two species.

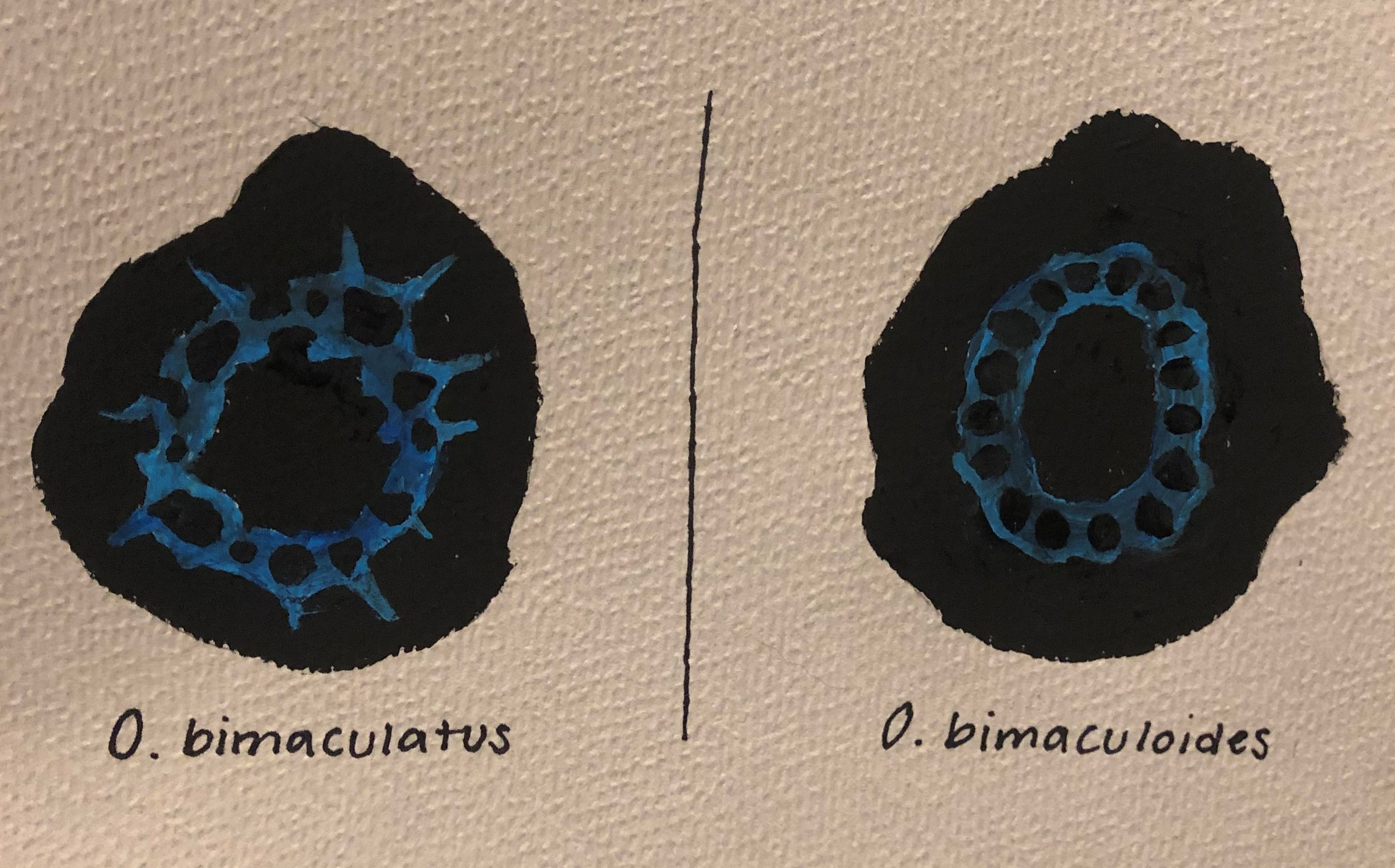
Difference in chain-like pattern of ocelli between O. bimaculatus and O. bimaculoides

== Feeding ==
=== Diet ===
O. bimaculatus is known to prey on crustaceans, snails, chitons, limpets, and bivalves. Studies have observed the predator-prey interactions between the O. bimaculatus and the Californian scorpionfish (Scorpaena guttata) in aquariums. Findings suggest that the Californian scorpionfish is included in the diet of O. bimaculatus in their natural habitat, specifically juvenile scorpionfish. As juveniles, the octopus tend to prey on smaller benthic, marine invertebrates which include chitons, bivalves, snails, and crabs. Additionally, diet appears to be strongly influenced by location, season, and sex.

=== Hunting ===
O. bimaculatus hunt regularly by swimming along the seafloor and pouncing at their prey using their web to feel if they successfully captured their prey. After capture, they use their beak and radula to consume their prey. There has been observations of certain species of fish following the octopus into kelp forests looking for scraps from the octopus prey.

== Distribution, habitat, and behavior ==
O. bimaculatus occurs in the northeast Pacific off the coast of Southern California (north to Point Conception) and Baja California (the exact southern limit is unknown) mainly in the intertidal and subtidal regions. These octopus have been observed in kelp forests, bed rock, and rock walls. Typically found on the seafloor, these octopus occupy areas beneath rocks, inside of holes and inside crevices. Juvenile octopus utilize the smaller areas in bedrock, including empty shells found around the bedrock. They frequently use shells for shelter, including the shells of Cypraea spadicea, Astraea undosa, and Hinnites giganteus.

Larger octopus have the ability and power to "blow" sand or move sand to create shelter. They do this through a mechanism called jet propulsion, which allow them to pump water out quickly through a siphon exerting enough force to move sediment. This process allows the octopus to dig deep holes for shelter in a matter of minutes. The arms of O. bimaculatus are also useful in creating shelter. Each arm is covered in suckers that give the octopus the ability to grip and move smooth wet surfaces such as rocks and shells.

Octopus tend to move from shelter to shelter only residing in one shelter for a short 1–3 month time period before moving on to the next. Octopus leave their shelters for a number of reasons, the primary reason being to forage. Other reasons include competition for space with other octopus or fleeing an area with high risk of predation.

Predators known to hunt O. bimaculatus include the California sheephead (Semicossyphus pulcher), the kelp bass (Paralabrax clathratus), and the California moray eel (Gymnothorax mordax).

== Life history ==
=== Lifespan ===
O. bimaculatus lives about 12–18 months. Young are planktonic for one to several months before settling on the ground. However, in captivity, O. bimaculatus has been observed to live up to 2 years.

=== Reproduction ===
Most matings occur in May and June when water temperatures are rising, and females then lay their eggs between April and August, though they can mate throughout the year.

Mating usually takes between 10 and 60 minutes. During this time, the male extends a modified arm called the hectocotylus, which transfers spermatophores to the female. After the eggs are fertilized, the females lay their eggs in a sheltered area protected by rocks.

The amount of eggs laid depends on the size on the female, but typically the number of eggs are very high, with the average being approximately 20,000 eggs, about 100 to 250 per strand. The larger females tend to lay more eggs than the smaller females. After the eggs are laid, the females stay to care for and protect the eggs until they hatch into planktonic larvae. Females tend to die during the process of watching over the eggs due to starvation and exhaustion.

=== Development ===
The stages of development on average range over a period of 50.4 days after fertilization occurs. The eggs take 30 to 90 days to fully develop, depending on water temperature. Studies have found development time is shortest when the water temperature is at 19.7 °C (67.5 °F).

There are two major stages in the development; the rapid initial stage and the second slower stage. Newly hatched eggs are planktonic and on average are 4 mm long from the top of the mantle to the end of the arms. Much of the embryonic development is similar to that of the common octopus (Octopus vulgaris).
