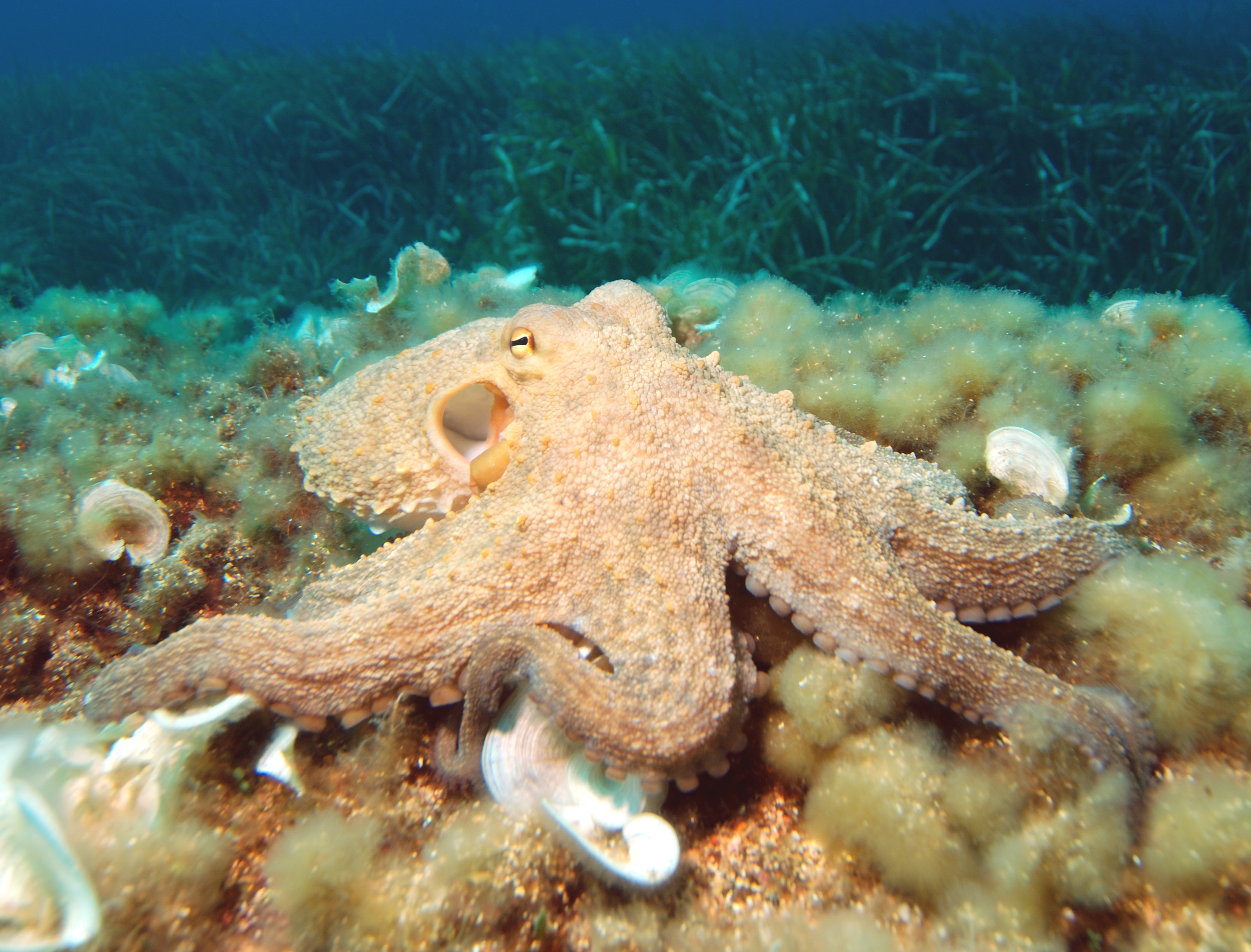
- Moving in Frankfurt

Conservation status
- Least Concern (IUCN 3.1)

Scientific classification
- Kingdom: Animalia
- Phylum: Mollusca
- Class: Cephalopoda
- Order: Octopoda
- Family: Octopodidae
- Genus: Octopus
- Species: O. vulgaris

Binomial name
- Octopus vulgaris Cuvier, 1797
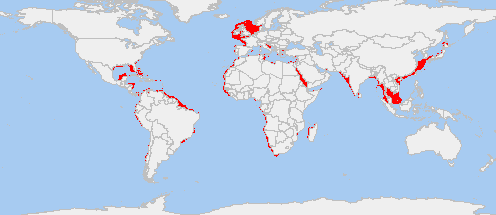
- Common octopus worldwide distribution

Synonyms
- Octopus octopodia Tryon, 1879; Octopus vulgaris Lamarck, 1798; Octopus rugosus Bosc, 1792

= Common octopus =

Common octopus Temporal range: Pleistocene to recent

Species of cephalopod

The common octopus (Octopus vulgaris) is a mollusk belonging to the class Cephalopoda. Octopus vulgaris is one of the most studied of all the octopus species, and also one of the most intelligent. It ranges from the eastern Atlantic, extends from the Mediterranean Sea, Black sea and the southern coast of England, to the southern coast of South Africa. It also occurs off the Azores, Canary Islands, and Cape Verde Islands. The species is also common in the Western Atlantic.

== Characteristics ==
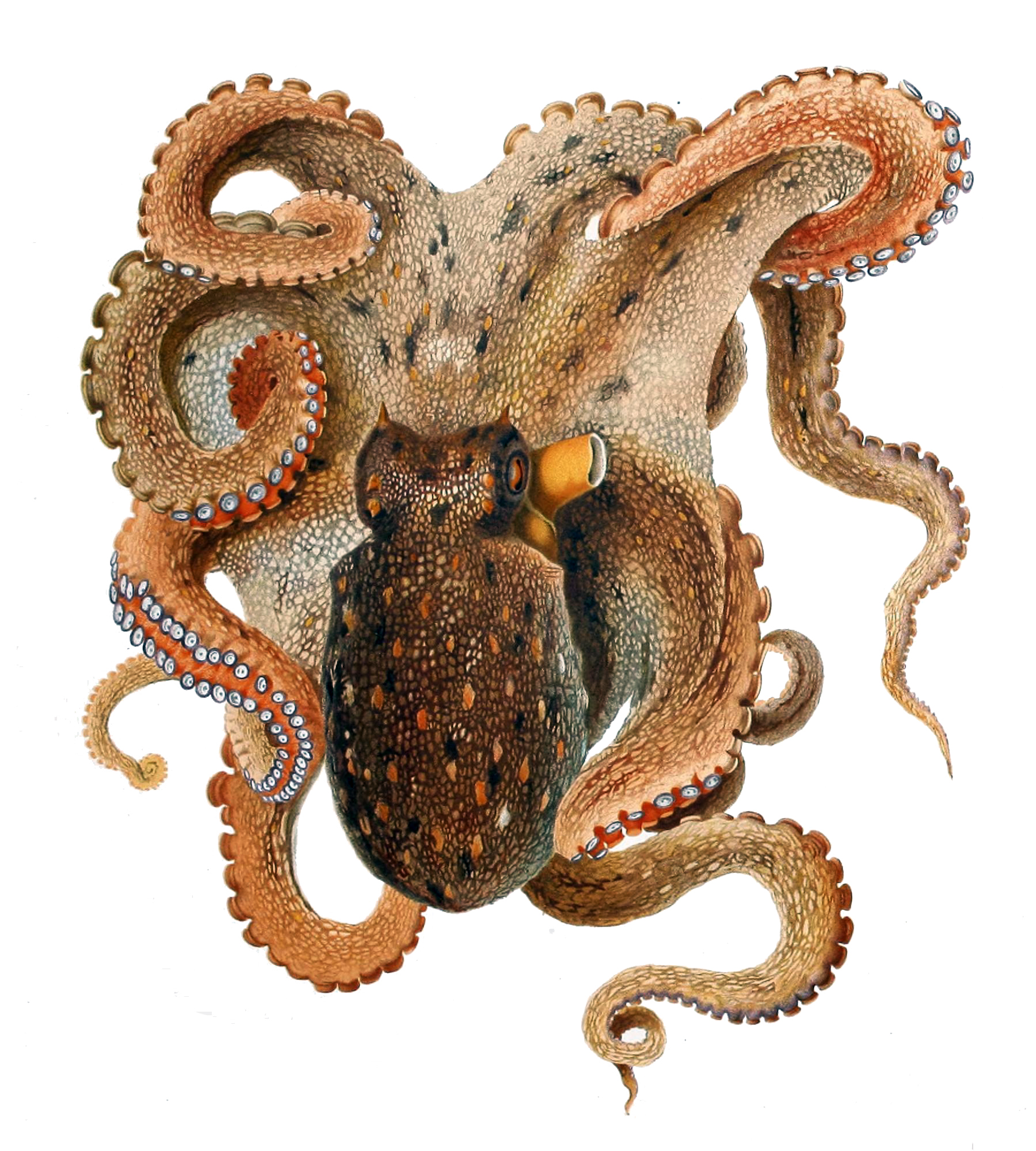

In the Aquarium of Seville, Spain

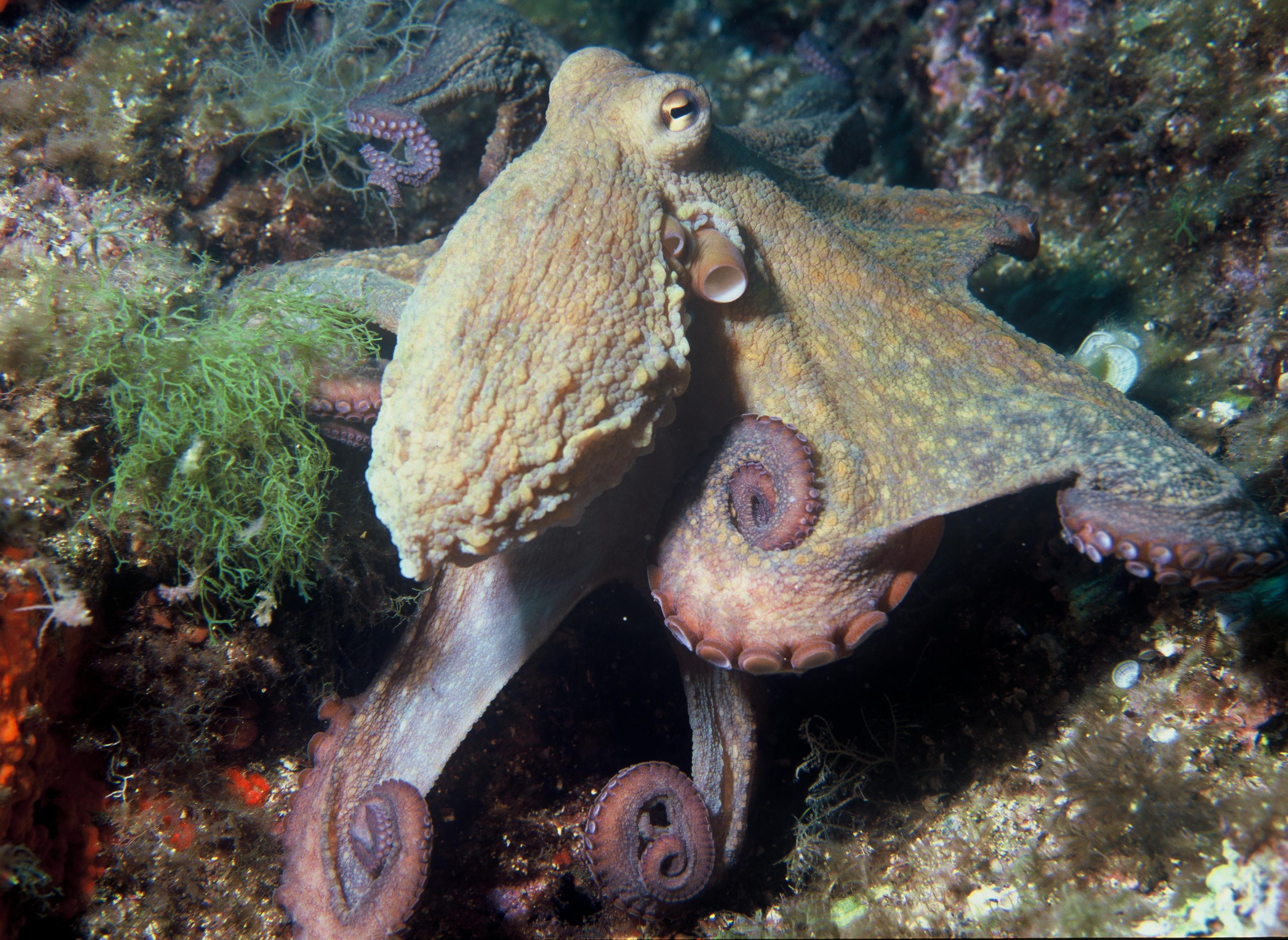
From the Mediterranean Sea

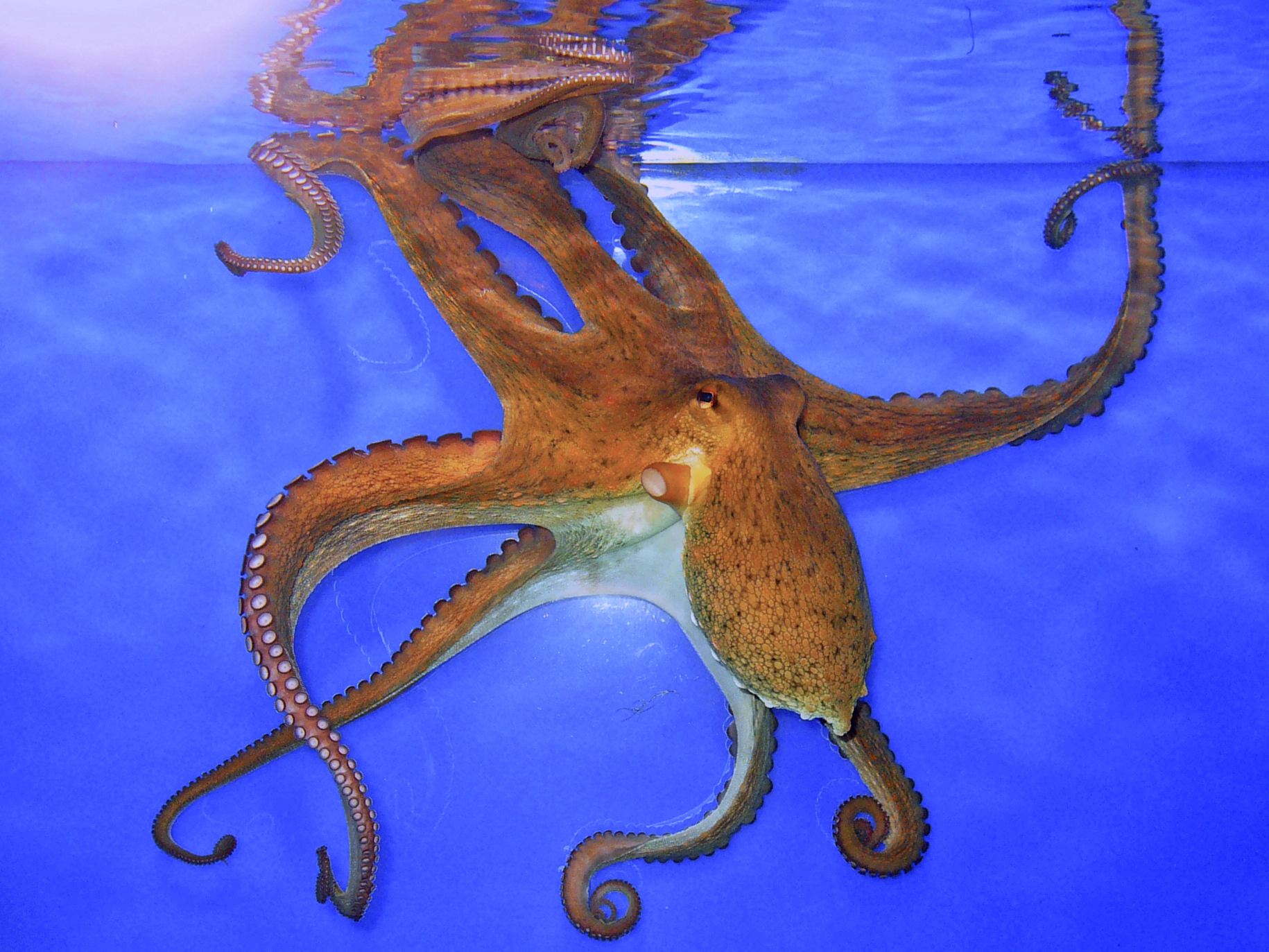
Staatliches Museum für Naturkunde Karlsruhe, Germany

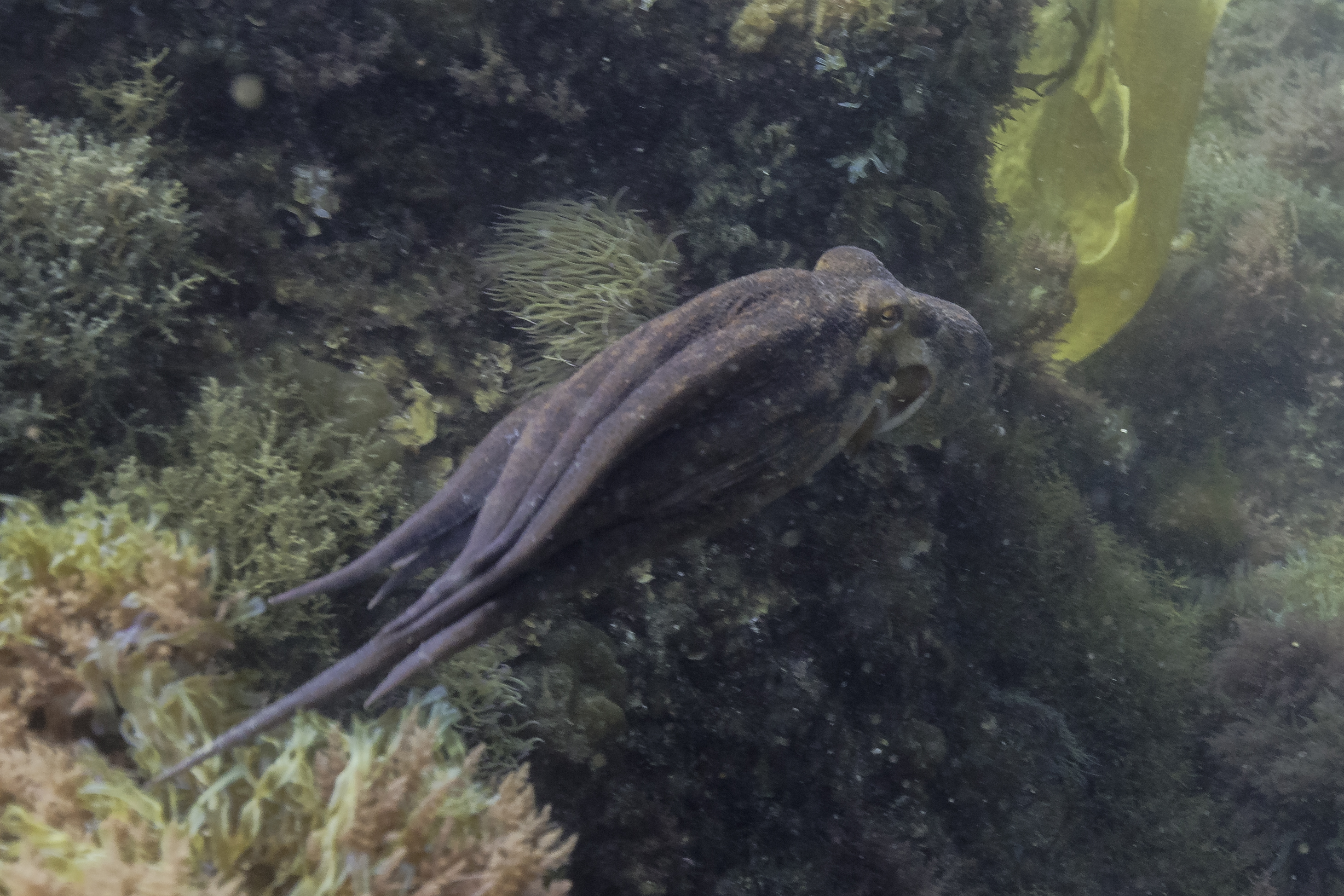
From Portugal

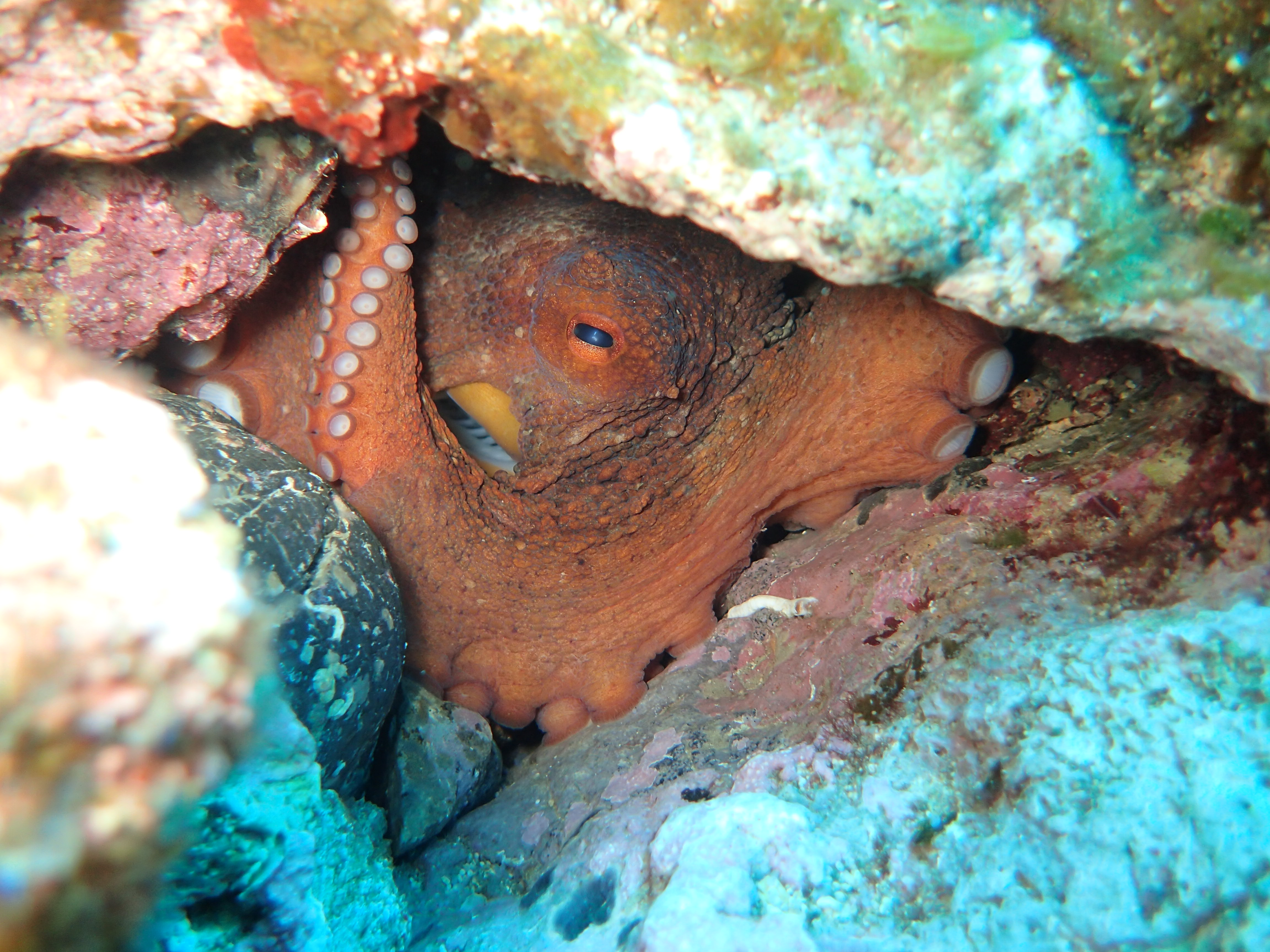
Near Crete

Octopus vulgaris grows to 25 cm (10 inches) in mantle length with arms up to 1 m (3.3 feet) long. It lives for 1–2 years and may weigh up to 9 kg (20 pounds). Mating may become cannibalistic. O. vulgaris is caught by bottom trawls on a huge scale off the northwestern coast of Africa. More than 20,000 tonnes (22,000 short tons) are harvested annually.

The common octopus hunts at dusk. Crabs, lobsters, and bivalve mollusks (such as cockles) are preferred, although the octopus eats almost anything it can catch. It is able to change colour to blend in with its surroundings, and is able to jump upon any unwary prey that wanders across its path. Using its beak, it is able to break into the shells of shelled mollusks. It also possesses venom to subdue its prey.

They have evolved to have large nervous systems and brains. An individual has about 500 million neurons in its body, almost comparable to dogs. They are intelligent enough to distinguish brightness, navigate mazes, recognize individual people, learn how to unscrew a jar or raid lobster traps. They have also been observed keeping "gardens", in which they collect various marine plant life and algae, alongside collections of shells and rocks; this behavior may have inspired the 1969 Beatles title, "Octopus' Garden". O. vulgaris was the first invertebrate animal protected by the Animals (Scientific Procedures) Act 1986 in the UK. Training experiments have shown the common octopus can distinguish the brightness, size, shape, and horizontal or vertical orientation of objects.

A 2026 study found that common octopuses use a three-step sequence to squeeze through openings wider than the distance between their eyes, and add a fourth step when the opening is narrower.

== Species complex ==
While traditionally described as a cosmopolitan species, recent genetic research has identified Octopus vulgaris as a species complex. There are currently six recognized members of the Octopus vulgaris species complex. Each member of the complex is associated with specific geographic regions, often associated with continental coastlines.

- Octopus vulgaris
- Octopus tetricus
- Octopus americanus
- Octopus aff. vulgaris
- Octopus sinensis
- Octopus djinda

== Physiology ==
=== Habitat and demands ===
The common octopus has worldwide distribution in tropical, subtropical and temperate waters throughout the world. They prefer the floor of relatively shallow, rocky, coastal waters, often no deeper than 200 m (660 feet). Although they prefer around 36 grams per liter (0.0013 lb/cu in), salinity throughout their global habitat is found to be between roughly 30 and 45 grams per liter (0.0011 and 0.0016 lb/cu in). They are exposed to a wide variety of temperatures in their environments, but their preferred temperature ranges from about 15 to 16 °C (59 to 61 °F). In especially warm seasons, the octopus can often be found deeper than usual to escape the warmer layers of water. In moving vertically throughout the water, the octopus is subjected to various pressures and temperatures, which affect the concentration of oxygen available in the water. This can be understood through Henry's law, which states that the concentration of a gas in a substance is proportional to pressure and solubility, which is influenced by temperature. These various discrepancies in oxygen availability introduce a requirement for regulation methods.

Primarily, the octopus situates itself in a shelter where a minimal amount of its body is presented to the external water. When it does move, most of the time it is along the ocean or sea floor, in which case the underside of the octopus is still obscured. This crawling increases metabolic demands greatly, requiring they increase their oxygen intake by roughly 2.4 times the amount required for a resting octopus. This increased demand is met by an increase in the stroke volume of the octopus' heart.

The octopus does sometimes swim throughout the water, exposing itself completely. In doing so, it uses a jet mechanism that involves creating a much higher pressure in its mantle cavity that allows it to propel itself through the water. As the common octopus' heart and gills are located within its mantle, this high pressure also constricts and puts constraints on the various vessels that are returning blood to the heart. Ultimately, this creates circulation issues and is not a sustainable form of transportation, as the octopus cannot attain an oxygen intake that can balance the metabolic demands of maximum exertion.

=== Respiration ===
The octopus uses gills as its respiratory surface. The gill is composed of branchial ganglia and a series of folded lamellae. Primary lamellae extend out to form demi branches and are further folded to form the secondary free folded lamellae, which are only attached at their tops and bottoms. The tertiary lamellae are formed by folding the secondary lamellae in a fan-like shape. Water moves slowly in one direction over the gills and lamellae, into the mantle cavity and out of the octopus' funnel.

The structure of the octopus' gills allows for a high amount of oxygen uptake; up to 65% in water at 20 °C (68 °F). The thin skin of the octopus accounted for a large portion of oxygen uptake in an in-vitro study; the estimate suggests around 41% of all oxygen absorption is through the skin when at rest. This number is affected by the activity of the animal – the oxygen uptake increases when the octopus is exercising due to its entire body being constantly exposed to water, but the total amount of oxygen absorption through skin is actually decreased to 33% as a result of the metabolic cost of swimming. When the animal is curled up after eating, its absorption through its skin can drop to 3% of its total oxygen uptake. The octopus' respiratory pigment, hemocyanin, also assists in increasing oxygen uptake. Octopuses can maintain a constant oxygen uptake even when oxygen concentrations in the water decrease to around 3.5 kPa (0.51 psi) or 31.6% saturation (standard deviation 8.3%). If oxygen saturation in sea water drops to about 1–10% it can be fatal for Octopus vulgaris depending on the weight of the animal and the water temperature. Ventilation may increase to pump more water carrying oxygen across the gills but due to receptors found on the gills the energy use and oxygen uptake remains at a stable rate. The high percent of oxygen extraction allows for energy saving and benefits for living in an area of low oxygen concentration.

Water is pumped into the mantle cavity of the octopus, where it comes into contact with the internal gills. The water has a high concentration of oxygen compared to the blood returning from the veins, so oxygen diffuses into the blood. The tissues and muscles of the octopus use oxygen and release carbon dioxide when breaking down glucose in the Krebs cycle. The carbon dioxide then dissolves into the blood or combines with water to form carbonic acid, which decreases blood pH. The Bohr effect explains why oxygen concentrations are lower in venous blood than arterial blood and why oxygen diffuses into the bloodstream. The rate of diffusion is affected by the distance the oxygen has to travel from the water to the bloodstream as indicated by Fick's laws of diffusion. Fick's laws explain why the gills of the octopus contain many small folds that are highly vascularized. They increase surface area, thus also increase the rate of diffusion. The capillaries that line the folds of the gill epithelium have a very thin tissue barrier (10 μm), which allows for fast, easy diffusion of the oxygen into the blood. In situations where the partial pressure of oxygen in the water is low, diffusion of oxygen into the blood is reduced, Henry's law can explain this phenomenon. The law states that at equilibrium, the partial pressure of oxygen in water will be equal to that in air; but the concentrations will differ due to the differing solubility. This law explains why O. vulgaris has to alter the amount of water cycled through its mantle cavity as the oxygen concentration in water changes.

The gills are in direct contact with water – carrying more oxygen than the blood – that has been brought into the mantle cavity of the octopus. Gill capillaries are quite small and abundant, which creates an increased surface area that water can come into contact with, thus resulting in enhanced diffusion of oxygen into the blood. Some evidence indicates that lamellae and vessels within the lamellae on the gills contract to aid in propelling blood through the capillaries.

=== Circulation ===
The octopus has three hearts, one main two-chambered heart charged with sending oxygenated blood to the body and two smaller branchial hearts, one next to each set of gills. The circulatory circuit sends oxygenated blood from the gills to the atrium of the systemic heart, then to its ventricle which pumps this blood to the rest of the body. Deoxygenated blood from the body goes to the branchial hearts which pump the blood across the gills to oxygenate it, and then the blood flows back to the systemic atrium for the process to begin again. Three aortae leave the systemic heart, two minor ones (the abdominal aorta and the gonadal aorta) and one major one, the dorsal aorta which services most of the body. The octopus also has large blood sinuses around its gut and behind its eyes that function as reserves in times of physiologic stress.

The octopus' heart rate does not change significantly with exercise, though temporary cardiac arrest of the systemic heart can be induced by oxygen debt, almost any sudden stimulus, or mantle pressure during jet propulsion. Its only compensation for exertion is through an increase in stroke volume of up to three times by the systemic heart, which means it suffers an oxygen debt with almost any rapid movement. The octopus is, however, able to control how much oxygen it pulls out of the water with each breath using receptors on its gills, allowing it to keep its oxygen uptake constant over a range of oxygen pressures in the surrounding water. The three hearts are also temperature and oxygen dependent and the beat rhythm of the three hearts are generally in phase with the two branchial hearts beating together followed by the systemic heart. The Frank–Starling law also contributes to overall heart function, through contractility and stroke volume, since the total volume of blood vessels must be maintained, and must be kept relatively constant within the system for the heart to function properly.

The blood of the octopus is composed of copper-rich hemocyanin, which is less efficient than the iron-rich hemoglobin of vertebrates, thus does not increase oxygen affinity to the same degree. Oxygenated hemocyanin in the arteries binds to CO_{2}, which is then released when the blood in the veins is deoxygenated. The release of CO_{2} into the blood causes it to acidify by forming carbonic acid. The Bohr effect explains that carbon dioxide concentrations affect the blood pH and the release or intake of oxygen. The Krebs cycle uses the oxygen from the blood to break down glucose in active tissues or muscles and releases carbon dioxide as a waste product, which leads to more oxygen being released. Oxygen released into the tissues or muscles creates deoxygenated blood, which returns to the gills in veins. The two brachial hearts of the octopus pump blood from the veins through the gill capillaries. The newly oxygenated blood drains from the gill capillaries into the systemic heart, where it is then pumped back throughout the body.

Blood volume in the octopus' body is about 3.5% of its body weight but the blood's oxygen-carrying capacity is only about 4 volume percent. This contributes to their susceptibility to the oxygen debt mentioned before. Shadwick and Nilsson concluded that the octopus circulatory system is "fundamentally unsuitable for high physiologic performance". Since the binding agent is found within the plasma and not the blood cells, a limit exists to the oxygen uptake that the octopus can experience. If it were to increase the hemocyanin within its blood stream, the fluid would become too viscous for the myogenic hearts to pump. Poiseuille's law explains the rate of flow of the bulk fluid throughout the entire circulatory system through the differences of blood pressure and vascular resistance.

Video of an octopus at rest and then moving through the water.

Like those of vertebrates, octopus blood vessels are very elastic, with a resilience of 70% at physiologic pressures. They are primarily made of an elastic fiber called octopus arterial elastomer, with stiffer collagen fibers recruited at high pressure to help the vessel maintain its shape without over-stretching. Shadwick and Nilsson theorized that all octopus blood vessels may use smooth-muscle contractions to help move blood through the body, which would make sense in the context of them living under water with the attendant pressure.

The elasticity and contractile nature of the octopus aorta serves to smooth out the pulsing nature of blood flow from the heart as the pulses travel the length of the vessel, while the vena cava serves in an energy-storage capacity. Stroke volume of the systemic heart changes inversely with the difference between the input blood pressure through the vena cava and the output back pressure through the aorta.

=== Osmoregulation ===
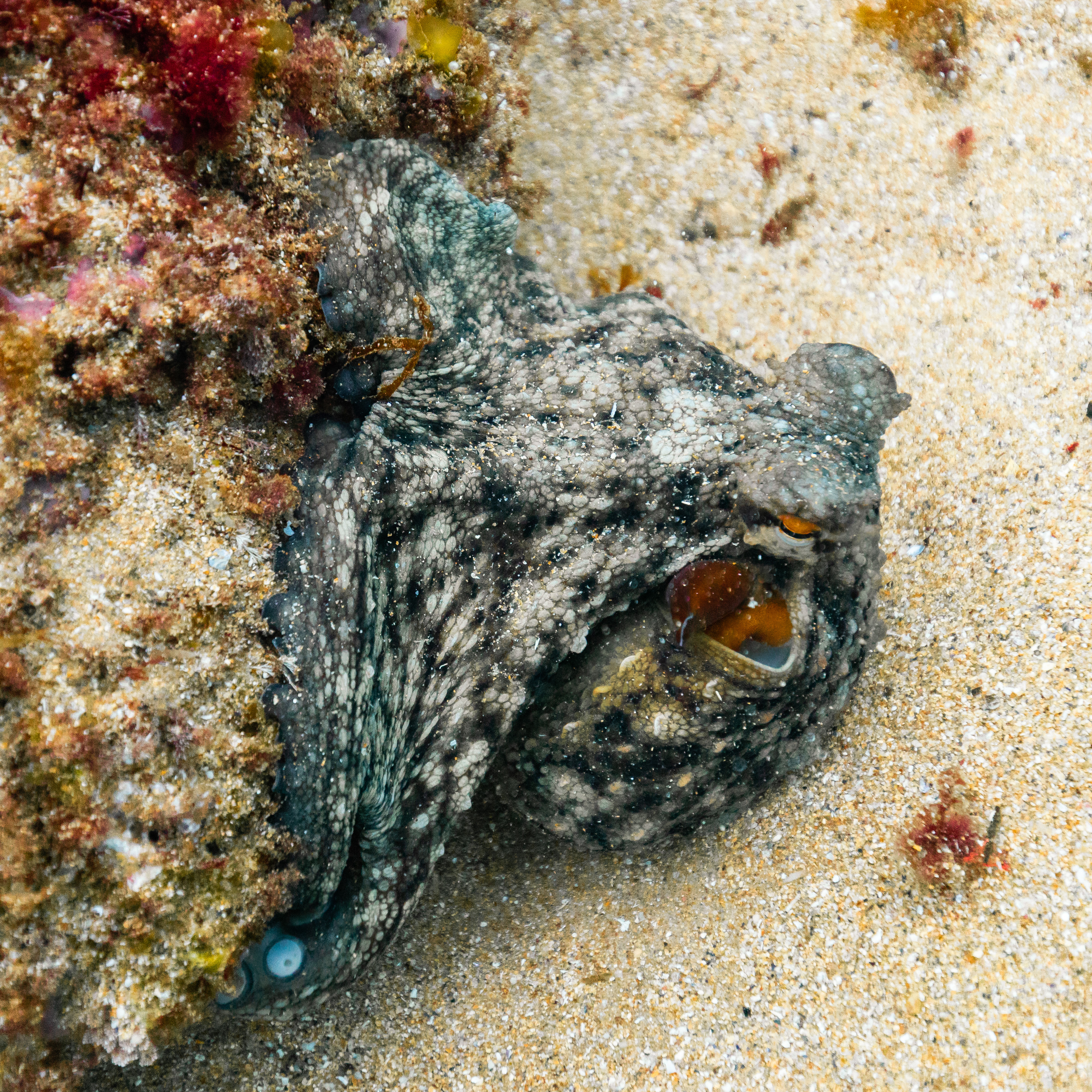
In Santander, Spain.

The hemolymph, pericardial fluid and urine of cephalopods, including the common octopus, are all isosmotic with each other, as well as with the surrounding sea water. It has been suggested that cephalopods do not osmoregulate, which would indicate that they are conformers. This means that they adapt to match the osmotic pressure of their environment, and because there is no osmotic gradient, there is no net movement of water from the organism to the seawater, or from the seawater into the organism. Octopuses have an average minimum salinity requirement of 27 g/L (0.00098 lb/cu in), and that any disturbance introducing significant amounts of fresh water into their environment can prove fatal.

In terms of ions, however, a discrepancy does seem to occur between ionic concentrations found in the seawater and those found within cephalopods. In general, they seem to maintain hypoionic concentrations of sodium, calcium, and chloride in contrast to the salt water. Sulfate and potassium exist in a hypoionic state, as well, with the exception of the excretory systems of cephalopods, where the urine is hyperionic. These ions are free to diffuse, and because they exist in hypoionic concentrations within the organism, they would be moving into the organism from the seawater. The fact that the organism can maintain hypoionic concentrations suggests not only that a form of ionic regulation exists within cephalopods, but also that they also actively excrete certain ions such as potassium and sulfate to maintain homeostasis.

O. vulgaris has a mollusc-style kidney system, which is very different from mammals. The system is built around an appendage of each branchial heart, which is essentially an extension of its pericardium. These long, ciliated ducts filter the blood into a pair of kidney sacs, while actively reabsorbing glucose and amino acids into the bloodstream. The renal sacs actively adjust the ionic concentrations of the urine, and actively add nitrogenous compounds and other metabolic waste products to the urine. Once filtration and reabsorption are complete, the urine is emptied into O. vulgaris' mantle cavity via a pair of renal papillae, one from each renal sac.

Temperature and body size directly affect the oxygen consumption of O. vulgaris, which alters the rate of metabolism. When oxygen consumption decreases, the amount of ammonia excretion also decreases due to the slowed metabolic rate. O. vulgaris has four different fluids found within its body: blood, pericardial fluid, urine, and renal fluid. The urine and renal fluid have high concentrations of potassium and sulphate, but low concentrations of chloride. The urine has low calcium concentrations, which suggests it has been actively removed. The renal fluid has similar calcium concentrations to the blood. Chloride concentrations are high in the blood, while sodium varies. The pericardial fluid has concentrations of sodium, potassium, chlorine and calcium similar to that of the salt water supporting the idea that O. vulgaris does not osmoregulate, but conforms. However, it has lower sulphate concentrations. The pericardial duct contains an ultrafiltrate of the blood known as the pericardial fluid, and the rate of filtration is partly controlled by the muscle- and nerve-rich branchial hearts. The renal appendages move nitrogenous and other waste products from the blood to the renal sacs, but do not add volume. The renal fluid has a higher concentration of ammonia than the urine or the blood, thus the renal sacs are kept acidic to help draw the ammonia from the renal appendages. The ammonia diffuses down its concentration gradient into the urine or into the blood, where it gets pumped through the branchial hearts and diffuses out the gills. The excretion of ammonia by O. vulgaris makes them ammonotelic organisms. Aside from ammonia, a few other nitrogenous waste products have been found to be excreted by O. vulgaris such as urea, uric acid, purines, and some free amino acids, but in smaller amounts.

Within the renal sacs, two recognized and specific cells are responsible for the regulation of ions. The two kinds of cells are the lacuna-forming cells and the epithelial cells that are typical to kidney tubules. The epithelia cells are ciliated, cylindrical, and polarized with three distinct regions. These three regions are apical, middle cytoplasmic, and basal lamina. The middle cytoplasmic region is the most active of the three due to the concentration of multiple organelles within, such as mitochondria and smooth and rough endoplasmic reticulum, among others. The increase of activity is due to the interlocking labyrinth of the basal lamina creating a crosscurrent activity similar to the mitochondrial-rich cells found in teleost marine fish. The lacuna-forming cells are characterized by contact to the basal lamina, but not reaching the apical rim of the associated epithelial cells and are located in the branchial heart epithelium. The shape varies widely and are occasionally more electron-dense than the epithelial cells, seen as a "diffused kidney" regulating ion concentrations.

One adaptation that O. vulgaris has is some direct control over its kidneys. It is able to switch at will between the right or left kidney doing the bulk of the filtration, and can also regulate the filtration rate so that the rate does not increase when the animal's blood pressure goes up due to stress or exercise. Some species of octopuses, including O. vulgaris, also have a duct that runs from the gonadal space into the branchial pericardium. Wells theorized that this duct, which is highly vascularized and innervated, may enable the reabsorption of important metabolites from the ovisac fluid of pregnant females by directing this fluid into the renal appendages.

=== Thermoregulation ===
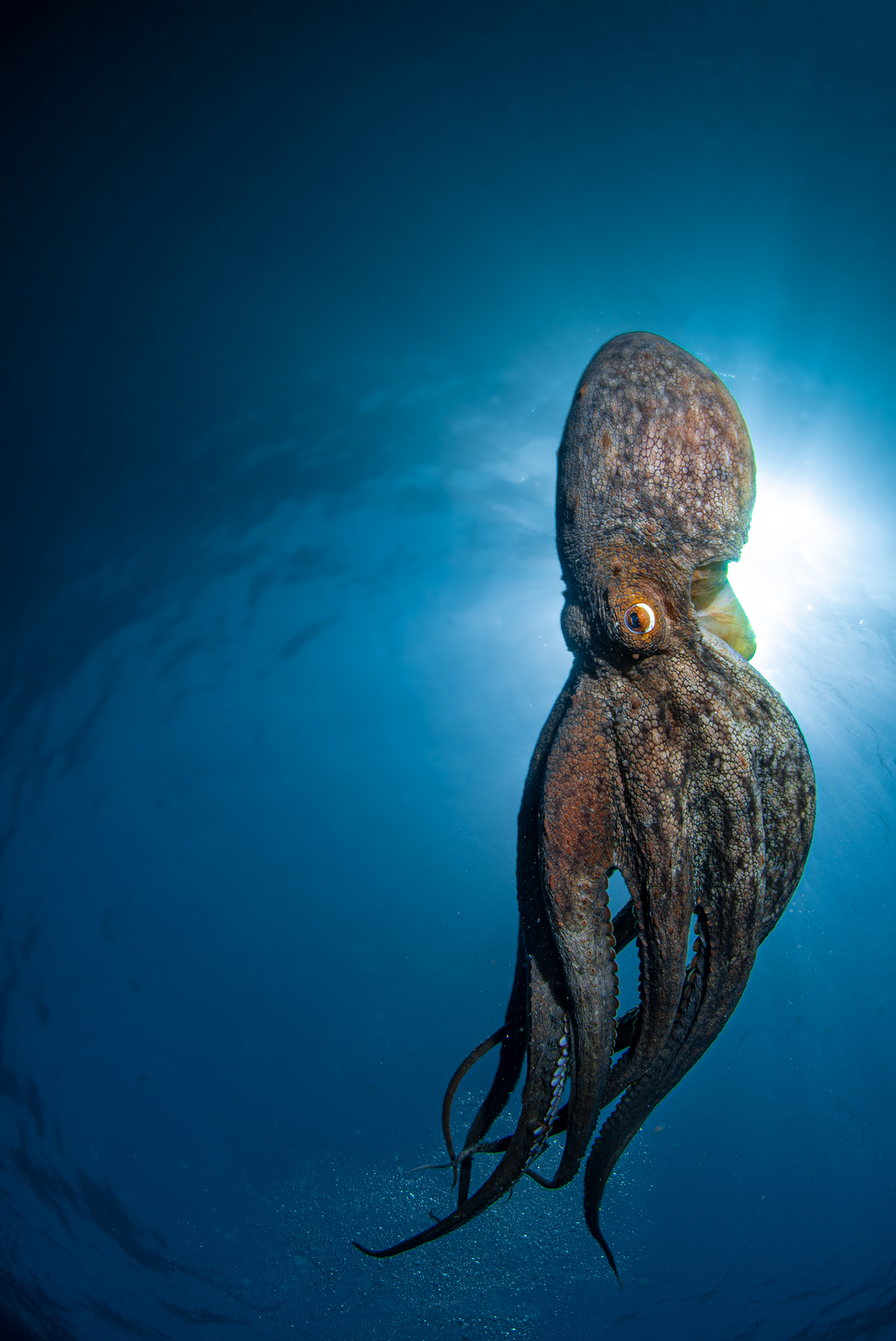
In the Torre Guaceto state nature reserve in Italy.

As an oceanic organism, O. vulgaris experiences a temperature variance due to many factors, such as season, geographical location, and depth. For example, octopuses living around Naples may experience a temperature of 25 °C (77 °F) in the summer and 15 °C (59 °F) in the winter. These changes would occur quite gradually, however, and thus would not require any extreme regulation.

The common octopus is a poikilothermic, eurythermic ectotherm, meaning that it conforms to the ambient temperature. This implies that no real temperature gradient is seen between the organism and its environment, and the two are quickly equalized. If the octopus swims to a warmer locale, it gains heat from the surrounding water, and if it swims to colder surroundings, it loses heat in a similar fashion.

O. vulgaris can apply behavioral changes to manage wide varieties of environmental temperatures. Respiration rate in octopods is temperature-sensitive – respiration increases with temperature. Its oxygen consumption increases when in water temperatures between 16 and 28 °C (61 and 82 °F), reaches a maximum at 28 °C (82 °F), and then begins to drop at 32 °C (90 °F). The optimum temperature for metabolism and oxygen consumption is between 18 and 24 °C (64 and 75 °F). Variations in temperature can also induce a change in hemolymph protein levels along oxygen consumption. As temperature increases, protein concentrations increase in order to accommodate the temperature. Also the cooperativity of hemocyanin increases, but the affinity decreases. Conversely, a decrease in temperature results in a decrease in respiratory pigment cooperativity and increase in affinity. The slight rise in P50 that occurs with temperature change allows oxygen pressure to remain high in the capillaries, allowing for elevated diffusion of oxygen into the mitochondria during periods of high oxygen consumption. The increase in temperature results in higher enzyme activity, yet the decrease in hemocyanin affinity allows enzyme activity to remain constant and maintain homeostasis. The highest hemolymph protein concentrations are seen at 32 °C (90 °F) and then drop at temperatures above this. Oxygen affinity in the blood decreases by 0.20 kPa/°C (0.016 psi/°F) at a pH of 7.4. The octopod's thermal tolerance is limited by its ability to consume oxygen, and when it fails to provide enough oxygen to circulate at extreme temperatures the effects can be fatal. O. vulgaris has a pH-independent venous reserve that represents the amount of oxygen that remains bound to the respiratory pigment at constant pressure of oxygen. This reserve allows the octopus to tolerate a wide range of pH related to temperature.

As a temperature conformer, O. vulgaris does not have any specific organ or structure dedicated to heat production or heat exchange. Like all animals, they produce heat as a result of ordinary metabolic processes such as digestion of food, but take no special means to keep their body temperature within a certain range. Their preferred temperature directly reflects the temperature to which they are acclimated. They have an acceptable ambient temperature range of 13–28 °C (55–82 °F), with their optimum for maximum metabolic efficiency being about 20 °C (68 °F).

As ectothermal animals, common octopuses are highly influenced by changes in temperature. All species have a thermal preference where they can function at their basal metabolic rate. The low metabolic rate allows for rapid growth, thus these cephalopods mate as the water becomes closest to the preferential zone. Increasing temperatures cause an increase in oxygen consumption by O. vulgaris. Increased oxygen consumption can be directly related to the metabolic rate, because the breakdown of molecules such as glucose requires an input of oxygen, as explained by the Krebs cycle. The amount of ammonia excreted conversely decreases with increasing temperature. The decrease in ammonia being excreted is also related to the metabolism of the octopus due to its need to spend more energy as the temperature increases. Octopus vulgaris will reduce the amount of ammonia excreted in order to use the excess solutes that it would have otherwise excreted due to the increased metabolic rate. Octopuses do not regulate their internal temperatures until it reaches a threshold where they must begin to regulate to prevent death. The increase in metabolic rate shown with increasing temperatures is likely due to the octopus swimming to shallower or deeper depths to stay within its preferential temperature zone.

=== Reproduction ===
Spawning of O. vulgaris extends from December to September with a unique peak in spring months.

== See also ==
- My Octopus Teacher (2020 documentary film)
