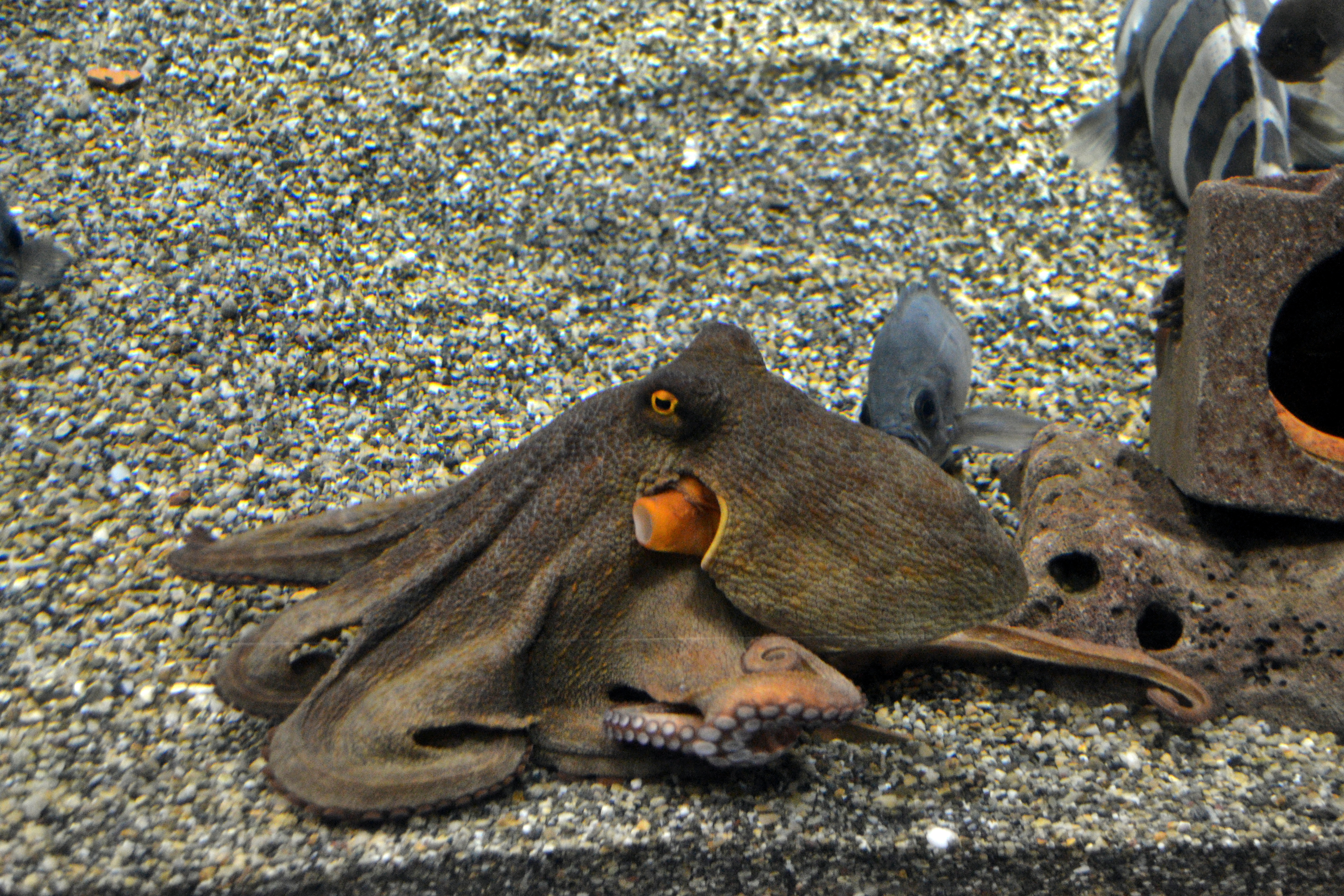

Scientific classification
- Kingdom: Animalia
- Phylum: Mollusca
- Class: Cephalopoda
- Order: Octopoda
- Family: Octopodidae
- Genus: Octopus
- Species: O. sinensis

Binomial name
- Octopus sinensis d'Orbigny 1834
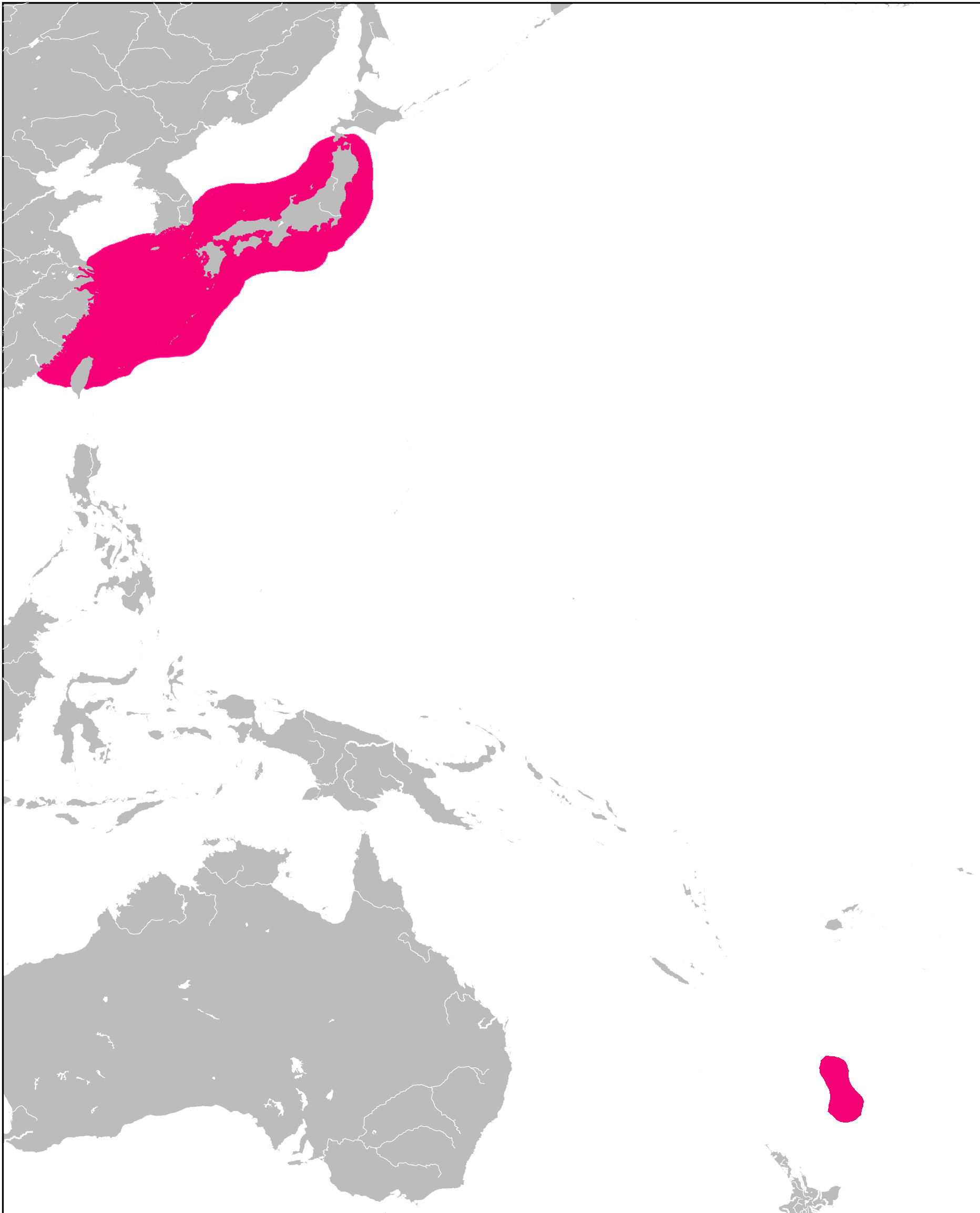
- O. sinensis range

Synonyms
- Octopus jollyorum A.Reid & N.G.Wilson, 2015

= Octopus sinensis =

Species of octopus

Octopus sinensis (commonly known as the East Asian common octopus) is a mollusk belonging to the class Cephalopoda. Octopus sinensis is a shallow-water species found in coastal temperate waters of Japan, South Korea, and China, with the species name, sinensis being Latin for "Chinese". Octopus sinensis is closely related to the Atlantic and Mediterranean common octopus, Octopus vulgaris, another octopus inhabiting the benthic zone; the two are so morphologically similar that O. sinensis was considered a population of Octopus vulgaris until 2017. Octopus sinensis are carnivores that prey upon on many shallow-water animals such as crustaceans and mollusks.

== Description ==
The East Asian common octopus is adapted to a benthic life at the bottom of the sea. Octopus sinensis has long arms with many suckers used for catching prey, a mantle without a rigid skeleton, which allows them to inhabit and hunt in small spaces and crevices in the seabed, horizontal pupils, and versatile skin with ability to change colors and camouflage themselves with the sea floor. Compared to O. vulgaris, O. sinensis have a broader mantle and relatively shorter arms with about 80 fewer suckers. Additionally, the third arm on the right of mature male O. sinensis have far fewer suckers than the same arm on O. vulgaris (120-140 vs. 150–190). This hectocotylized third right arm possesses erectile tissue on its tip and a channel for sperm packets. During copulation, O. sinensis males insert their third right arm into the female's mantle.

== Taxonomy ==
The species was first described by Alcide d'Orbigny in 1834. It was not until 2017 that O. sinensis was proven a separate species from O. vulgaris on the basis of molecular and morphological features, after zoologist Ian G. Gleadall designated a neotype O. sinensis in 2016.

In 2015, taxonomists Amanda Reid and Nerida Wilson in 2015 described a new species, O. jollyorum, based on specimens collected from Raoul Island in the Kermadec Islands in 2011, which were part of the O. vulgaris complex. Reid and Wilson identified morphological similarities between these specimens and O. sinensis, but decided to create a new description due to there being no available type specimen of O. sinensis. O. jollyorum was recognised as a junior synonym of O. sinensis in 2020.

== Development ==
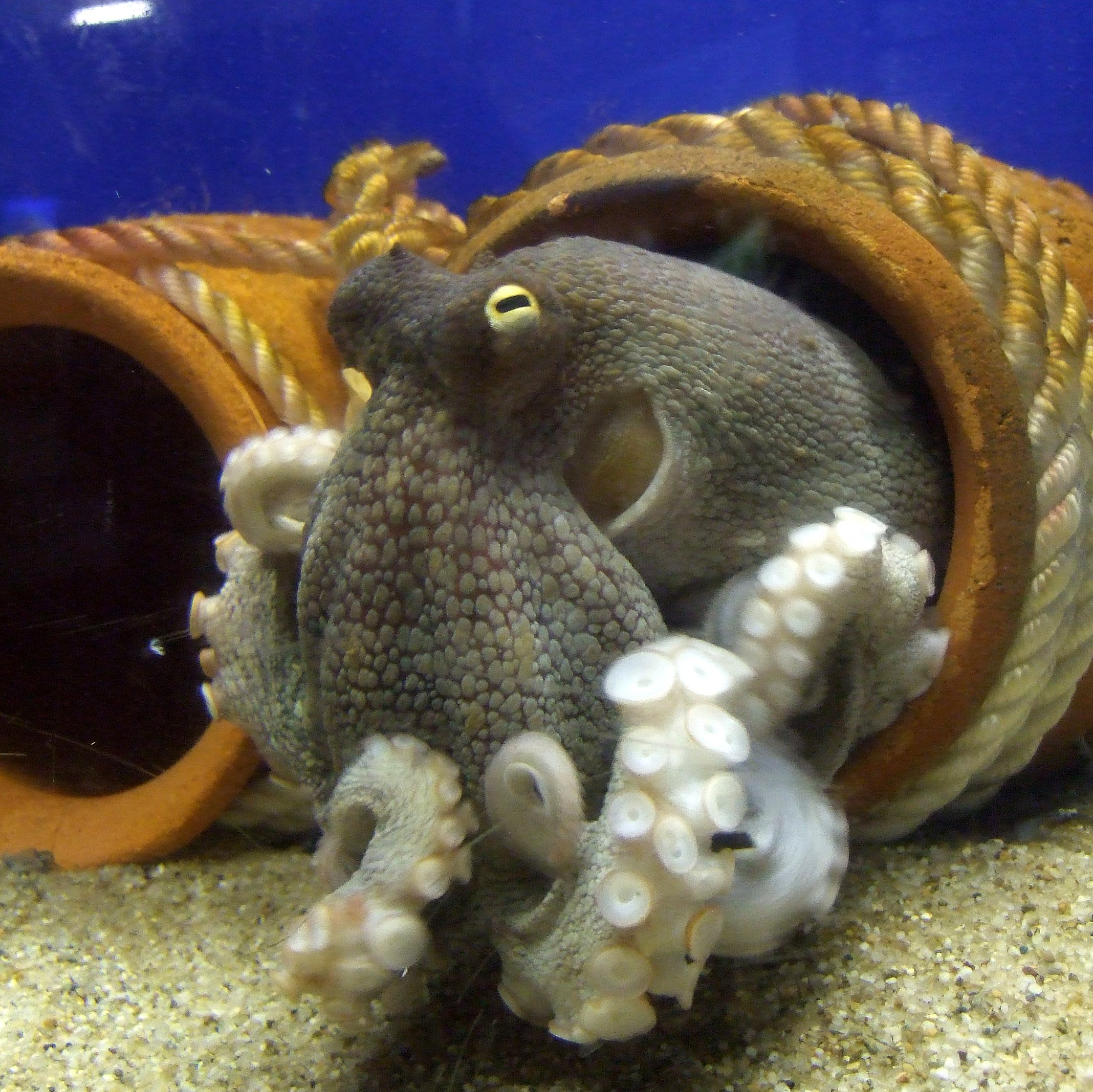
O. sinensis with octopus pots.

The East Asian common octopus goes through a several-week planktonic phase, in which they are floating in the open ocean. This occurs early in their development prior to their permanent benthic habitation, similar to many benthic octopus species. Right after hatching and during their planktonic phase, they experience the paralarva stage, with a morphology similar to those of juveniles and adults of the same species. The paralarvae have certain characteristics that differ from the adult stage, which allow them to thrive in the planktonic phase, such as transparent musculature, circular pupils rather than horizontal ones, a proportionately larger mantle (2.1 mm (0.083 in) in length) and shorter arms with fewer suckers (three to four on each arm), and a finely toothed beak. However, not much is known about the early life stages of the East Asian common octopus in their natural habitat due to their cryptic and allusive behavior. Recent studies suggest that transition from the planktonic stage to the benthic settlement is quite complex in O. sinensis and takes them a significant amount of time.

== Relation to humans ==
Both O. vulgaris and O. sinensis are commercially important food sources in China and both are vulnerable to over fishing. Therefore, it is important to delineate the two species for sustainable and fisheries management. In fact, some researchers claim that the misidentification of O. sinensis as O. vulgaris may be masking the decline of octopuses worldwide. catches of octopus have been steadily declining across the globe. Due to its rapid rate of growth and its high commercial value, O. sinensis is of particular interest in aquacultural cultivation. There have been several studies since the 1960s that have attempted to rear O. sinensis and O. vulgaris aquaculturally with little success. Current studies are focused on developing more accurate gene expression profiles to better understand the metabolic process and nutritional requirements of O. sinensis during its paralarval stage for aquacultural production of O. sinensis.

== Gallery ==
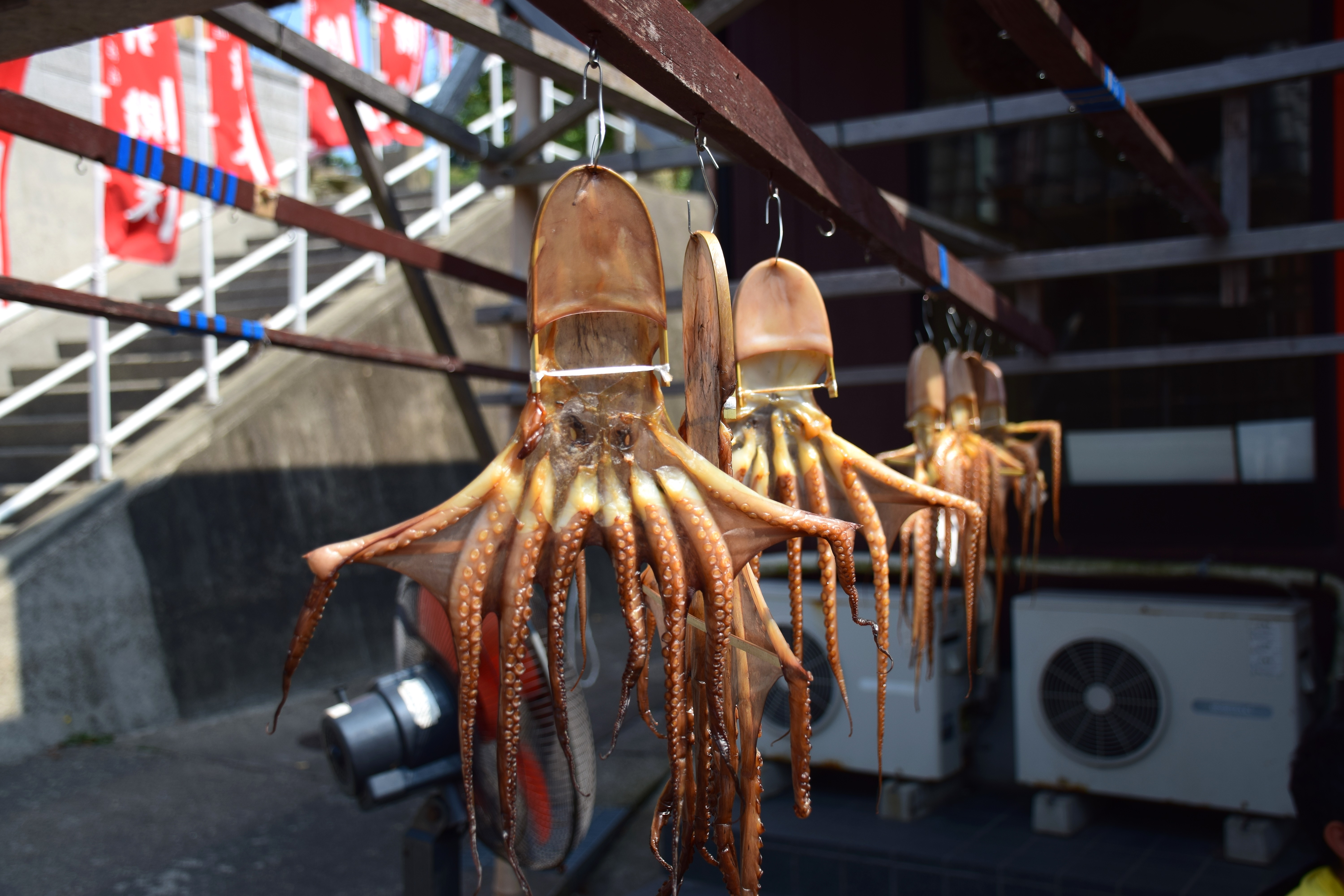
Drying on Himakajima Island, Japan

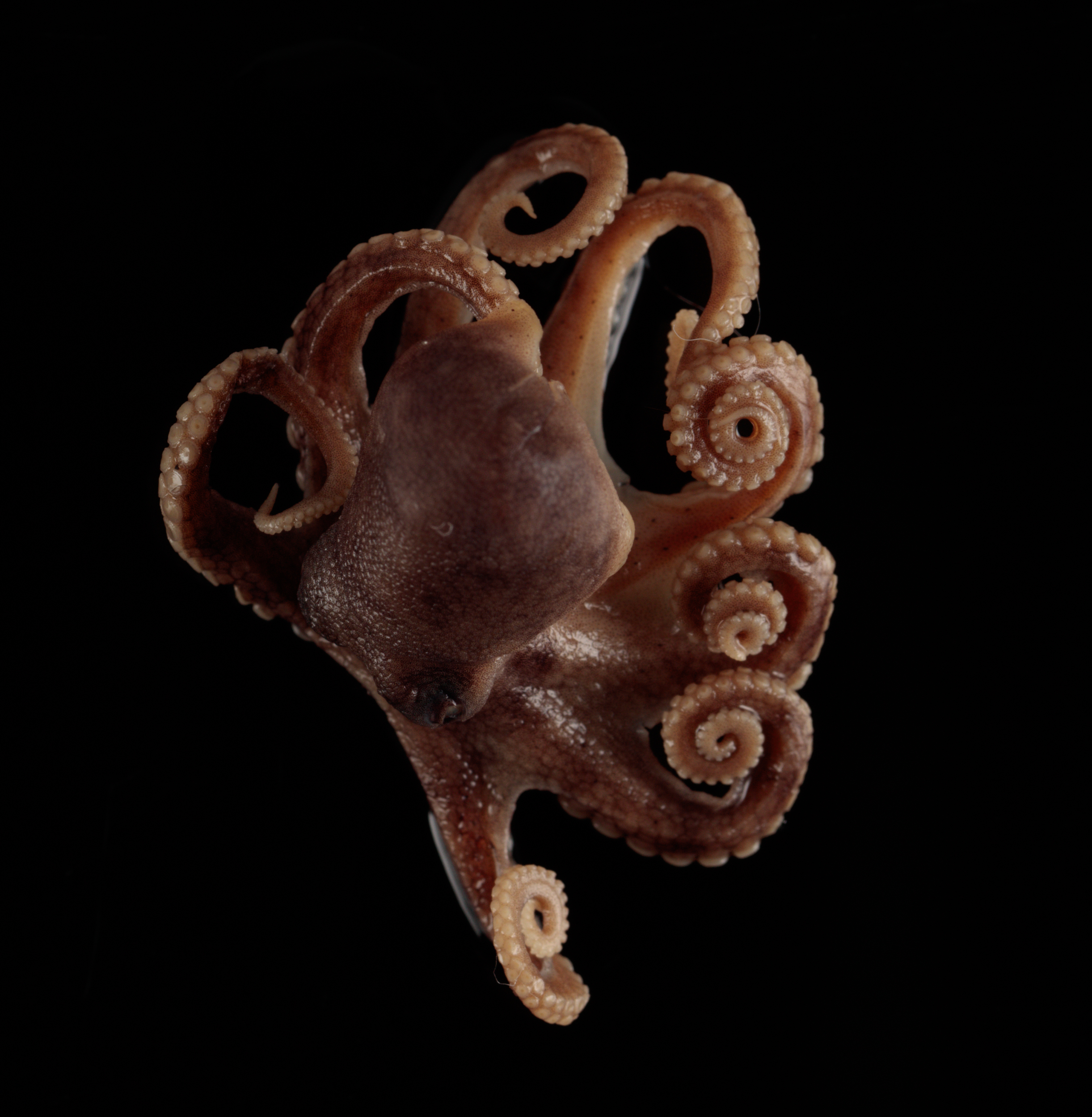
Type specimen of O. sinensis (then O. jollyorum)

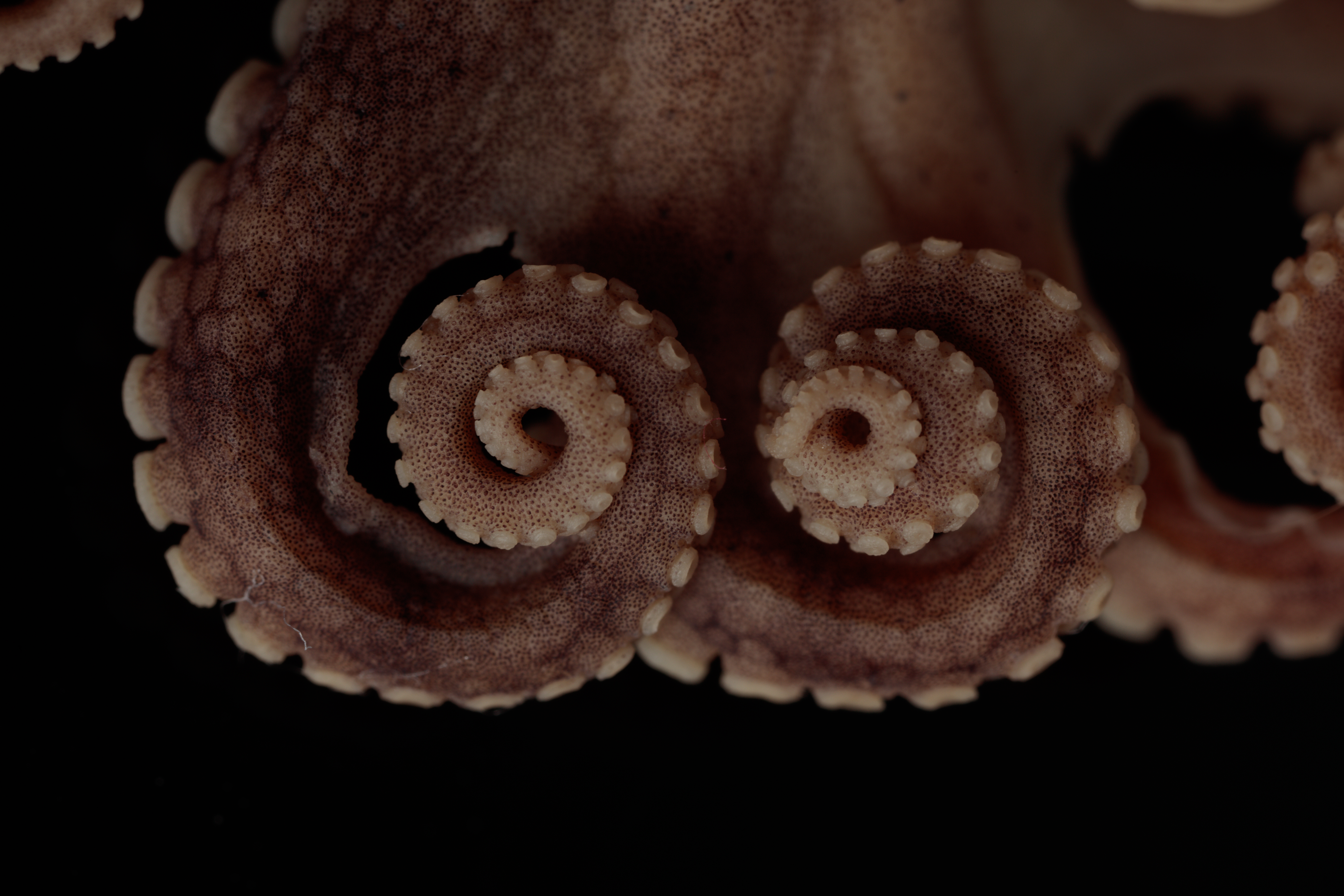
Tentacles of species

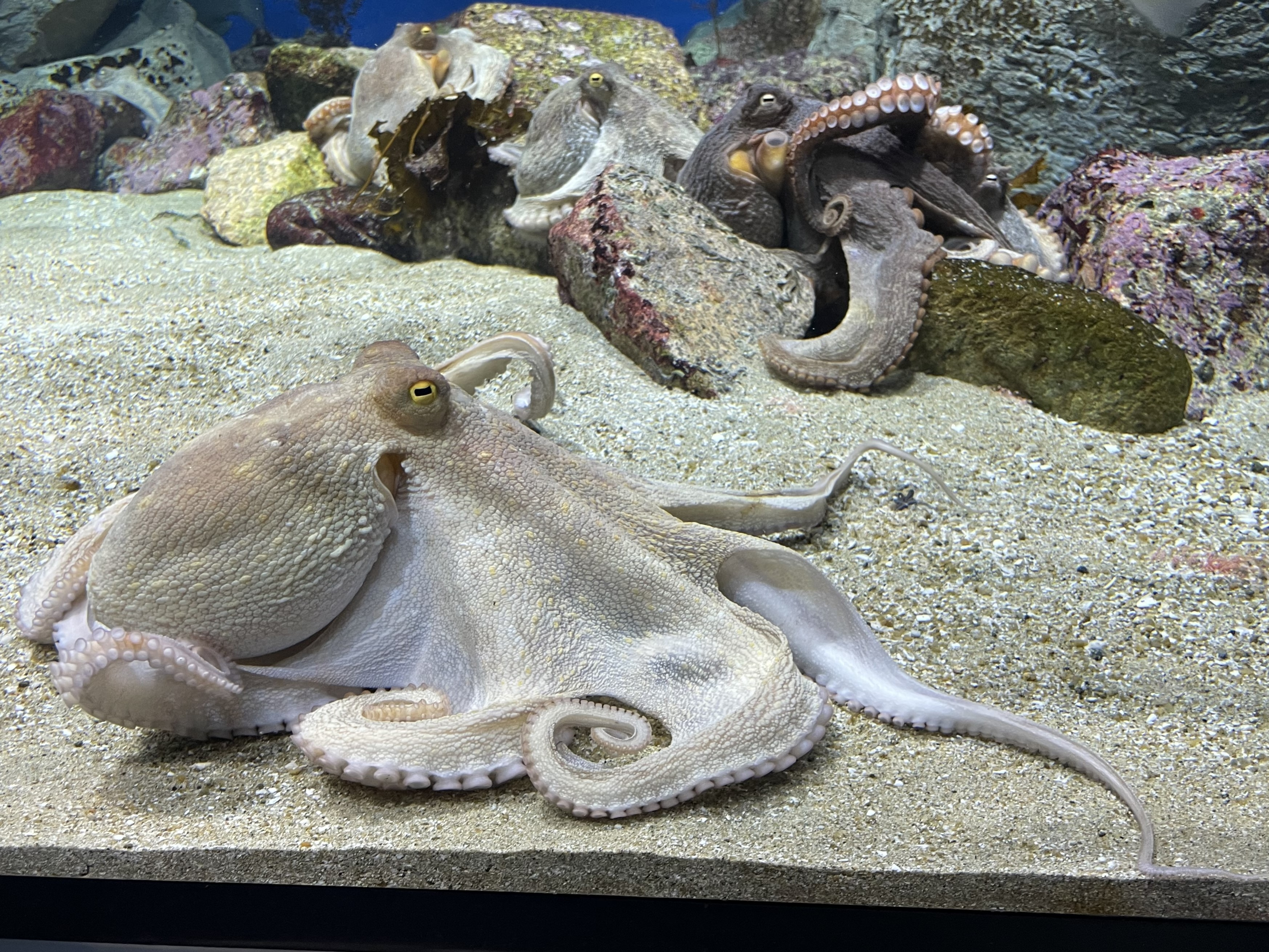
O. sinensis at Kobe Suma Sea World
