= Octopolis and Octlantis =

Settlements of gloomy octopuses in Australia

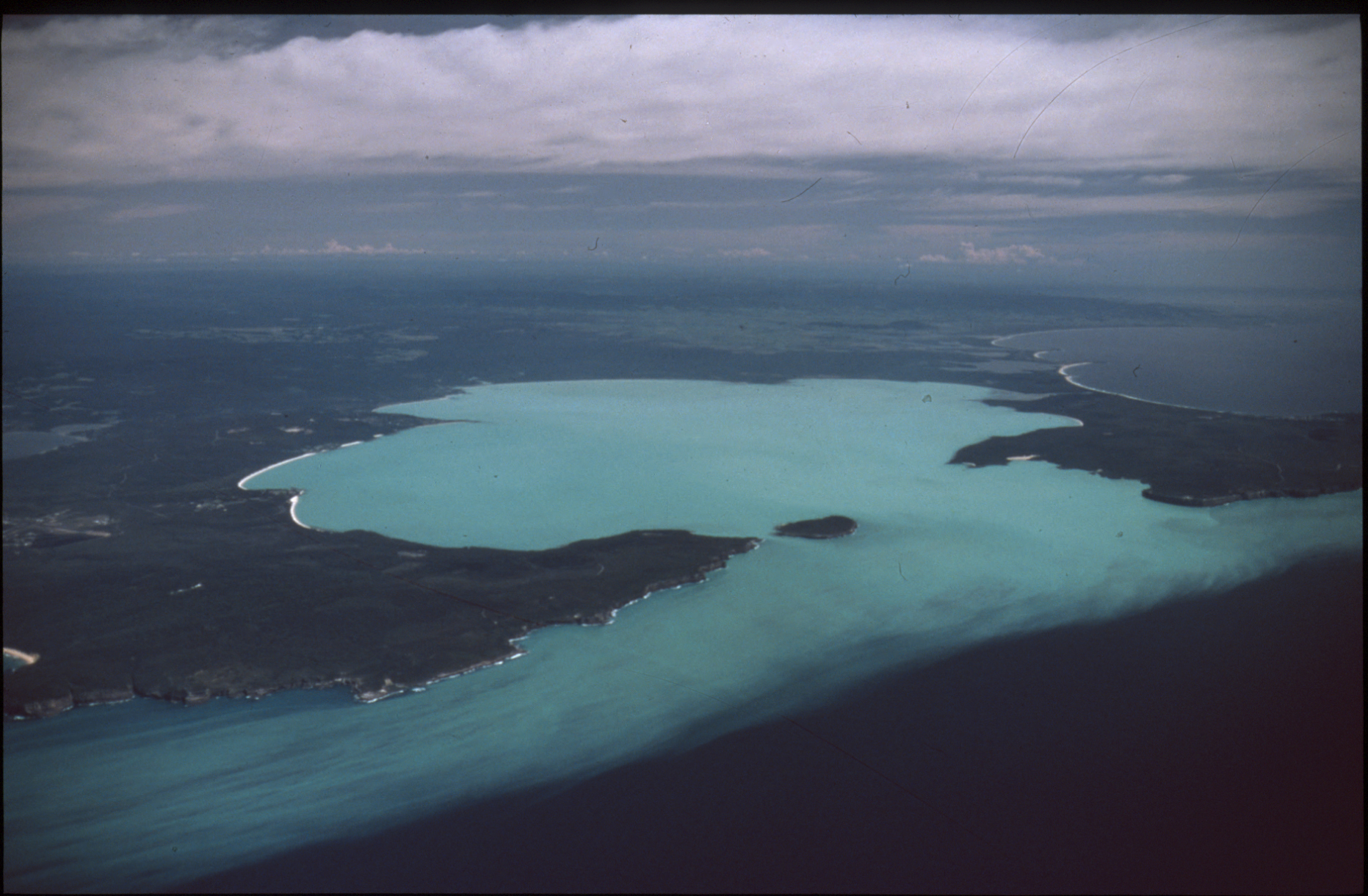
Jervis Bay in New South Wales, Australia, where both settlements are located.

Octopolis and Octlantis are two non-human settlements occupied by gloomy octopuses (Octopus tetricus) in Jervis Bay, in New South Wales, Australia. The first site, named "Octopolis" by biologists, was found in 2009. Octopolis consists of a bed of shells (mainly scallop shells) in an ellipse shape, 2–3 meters diameter on its longer axis, with a single piece of anthropogenic detritus, believed to be scrap metal, within the site. Octopuses build dens by burrowing into the shell bed. The shells appear to provide a much better building material for the octopuses than the fine sediment around the site. Up to 14 octopuses have been seen at Octopolis at a single time. In 2016, a second settlement was found nearby, named "Octlantis," which includes no human-made objects and can house similar numbers of octopuses. Both sites are within Booderee National Park. Some media accounts have described these sites as octopus "cities," but researchers who have worked on the sites view this as a misleading analogy.

== See also ==
- Cephalopod intelligence
- Octopus's Garden, a 1969 song by the Beatles. Ringo Starr wrote the song after learning about how octopuses travel along the sea bed picking up stones and shiny objects with which to build gardens.
