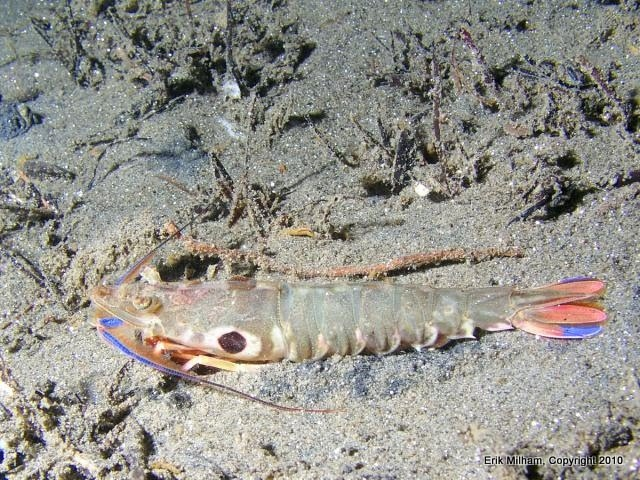
- Sicyonia penicillata

Scientific classification
- Domain: Eukaryota
- Kingdom: Animalia
- Phylum: Arthropoda
- Class: Malacostraca
- Order: Decapoda
- Suborder: Dendrobranchiata
- Superfamily: Penaeoidea
- Family: Sicyoniidae; Ortmann, 1898
- Genus: Sicyonia; H. Milne-Edwards, 1830

= Sicyonia =

Sicyonia Temporal range: Upper Cretaceous–Recent

Genus of crustaceans

Sicyonia is a genus of prawns, placed in its own family, Sicyoniidae. It differs from other prawns in that the last three pairs of its pleopods are uniramous, rather than biramous as seen in all other prawns.

Sicyonia contains 52 extant species, and one species known only from fossils from the Upper Cretaceous. Analyses using molecular phylogenetics suggest that the family Sicyoniidae is nested within the larger family Penaeidae, and that the latter family may need to be divided up, elevating each of its traditionally recognised tribes to the rank of family.

The extant species are:

- Sicyonia abathophila (Crosnier, 2003)
- Sicyonia adunca (Crosnier, 2003)
- Sicyonia affinis (Faxon, 1893)
- Sicyonia aliaffinis (Burkenroad, 1934)
- Sicyonia altirostrum (Crosnier, 2003)
- Sicyonia australiensis Hanamura & Wadley, 1998
- Sicyonia benthophila (De Man, 1907)
- Sicyonia bispinosa (De Haan, 1844)
- Sicyonia brevirostris (Stimpson, 1871)
- Sicyonia burkenroadi (Cobb, 1971)
- Sicyonia carinata (Brünnich, 1768)
- Sicyonia curvirostris (Balss, 1913)
- Sicyonia dejouanneti (Crosnier, 2003)
- Sicyonia disdorsalis (Burkenroad, 1934)
- Sicyonia disedwardsi (Burkenroad, 1934)
- Sicyonia disparri (Burkenroad, 1934)
- Sicyonia dorsalis (Kingsley, 1878)
- Sicyonia fallax (De Man, 1907)
- Sicyonia furcata (Miers, 1878)
- Sicyonia galeata (Holthuis, 1952)
- Sicyonia inflexa (Kubo, 1949)
- Sicyonia ingentis (Burkenroad, 1938)
- Sicyonia japonica (Balss, 1914)
- Sicyonia komai (Crosnier, 2003)
- Sicyonia laevigata (Stimpson, 1871)
- Sicyonia laevis (Spence Bate, 1881)
- Sicyonia lancifer (Olivier, 1811)
- Sicyonia longicauda (Rathbun, 1906)
- Sicyonia longicornis (Crosnier, 2003)
- Sicyonia martini (Pérez Farfante & Boothe, 1981)
- Sicyonia metavitulans (Crosnier, 2003)
- Sicyonia mixta (Burkenroad, 1946)
- Sicyonia nasica (Burukovsky, 1990)
- Sicyonia ocellata (Stimpson, 1860)
- Sicyonia olgae (Pérez Farfante, 1980)
- Sicyonia parafallax (Crosnier, 1995)
- Sicyonia parajaponica (Crosnier, 2003)
- Sicyonia parri (Burkenroad, 1934)
- Sicyonia parvula (De Haan, 1844)
- Sicyonia penicillata (Lockington, 1878)
- Sicyonia picta (Faxon, 1893)
- Sicyonia rectirostris (De Man, 1907)
- Sicyonia robusta (Crosnier, 2003)
- Sicyonia rocroi (Crosnier, 2003)
- Sicyonia rotunda (Crosnier, 2003)
- Sicyonia stimpsoni (Bouvier, 1905)
- Sicyonia taiwanensis (Crosnier, 2003)
- Sicyonia trispinosa (De Man, 1907)
- Sicyonia truncata (Kubo, 1949)
- Sicyonia typica (Boeck, 1864)
- Sicyonia vitulans (Kubo, 1949)
- Sicyonia wheeleri (Gurney, 1943)
