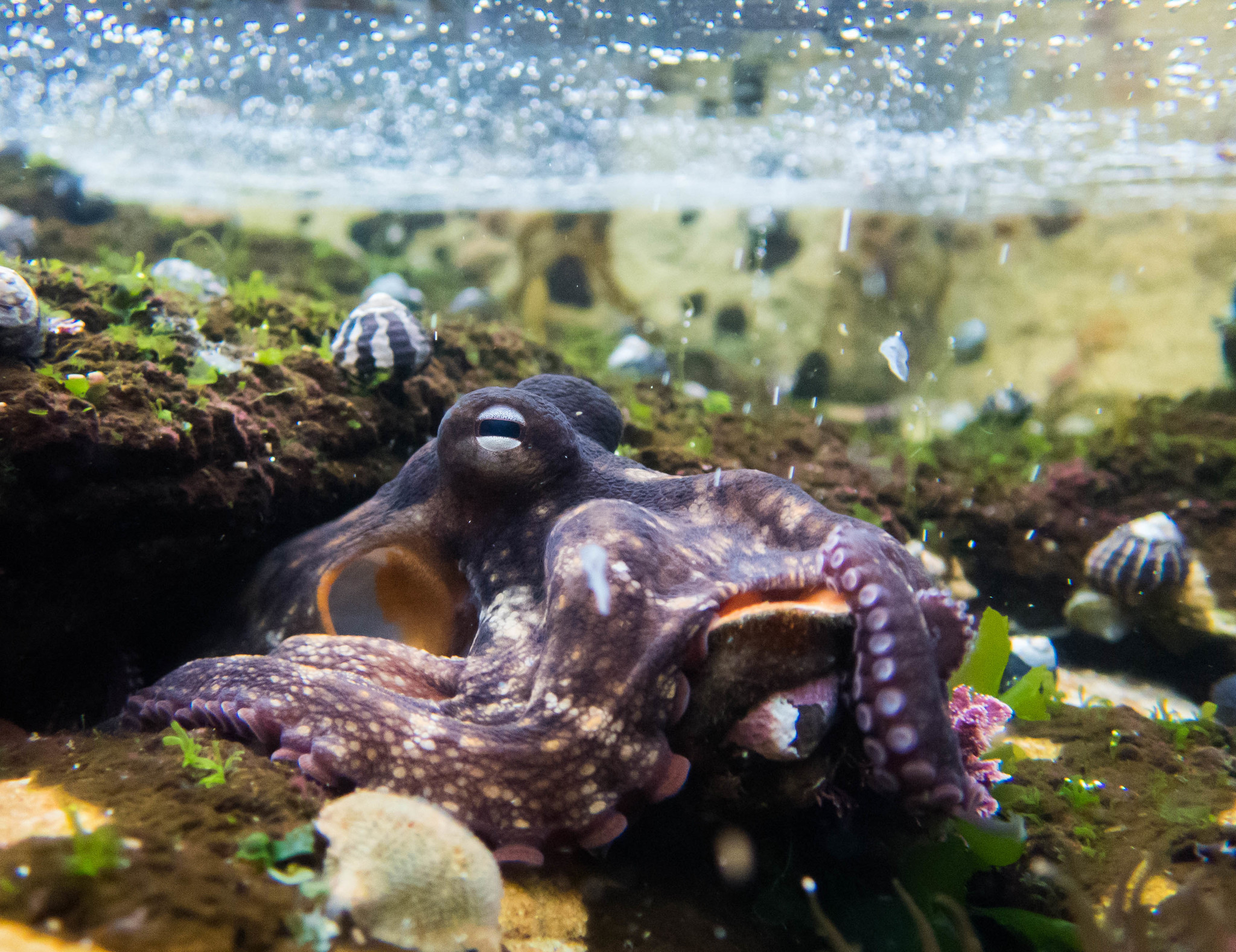

Conservation status
- Least Concern (IUCN 3.1)

Scientific classification
- Kingdom: Animalia
- Phylum: Mollusca
- Class: Cephalopoda
- Order: Octopoda
- Family: Octopodidae
- Genus: Octopus
- Species: O. tetricus

Binomial name
- Octopus tetricus Gould, 1852

Synonyms
- Octopus gibbsi O'Shea, 1999

= Octopus tetricus =

Species of mollusc

Octopus tetricus, the gloomy octopus, the common Sydney octopus, or the peachy octopus, is a species of octopus from the subtropical waters of eastern Australia and northern New Zealand. O. tetricus belongs to the Octopus vulgaris species group. All species within the O. vulgaris group are similar in morphology, behaviour, and physiology. The English translation of O. tetricus (Latin) is 'the gloomy octopus'. It is a significant species in the fishing industry in Australia. They play an important role in energy flux between trophic levels in the marine environment.

== Distribution ==
O. tetricus was originally discovered in New South Wales and was also found along the eastern Australian coastline. It occurs from Lakes Entrance in Victoria to Moreton Bay in southern Queensland. O. tetricus is distributed in the subtropical seas of eastern Australia and northern New Zealand, including Lord Howe Island. A close relative, Octopus djinda, occurs at similar latitudes in Western Australia, from Shark Bay to Cape Le Grand, and was considered to be conspecific with O. tetricus until 2021.The first sighting of O. tetricus in New Zealand was not until 1997, and has since become one of the most common species of octopus found in New Zealand, alongside Pinnoctopus cordiformis and Macroctopus maorum. O. tetricus populations in New Zealand are found along the North-East coast of the North Island, between the Bay of Plenty and Northland.

Gene squencing confirms that O. tetricus from Australia and New Zealand come from the same original population. It is proposed that the mechanism for gene flow across the Tasman Sea is through planktonic larvae and/or adults using floating wood or algae as transport. It is hypothesised that warmer waters spreading south of Australia are influencing populations to O. tetricus to disperse further south in response to climate change.

== Anatomy and morphology ==
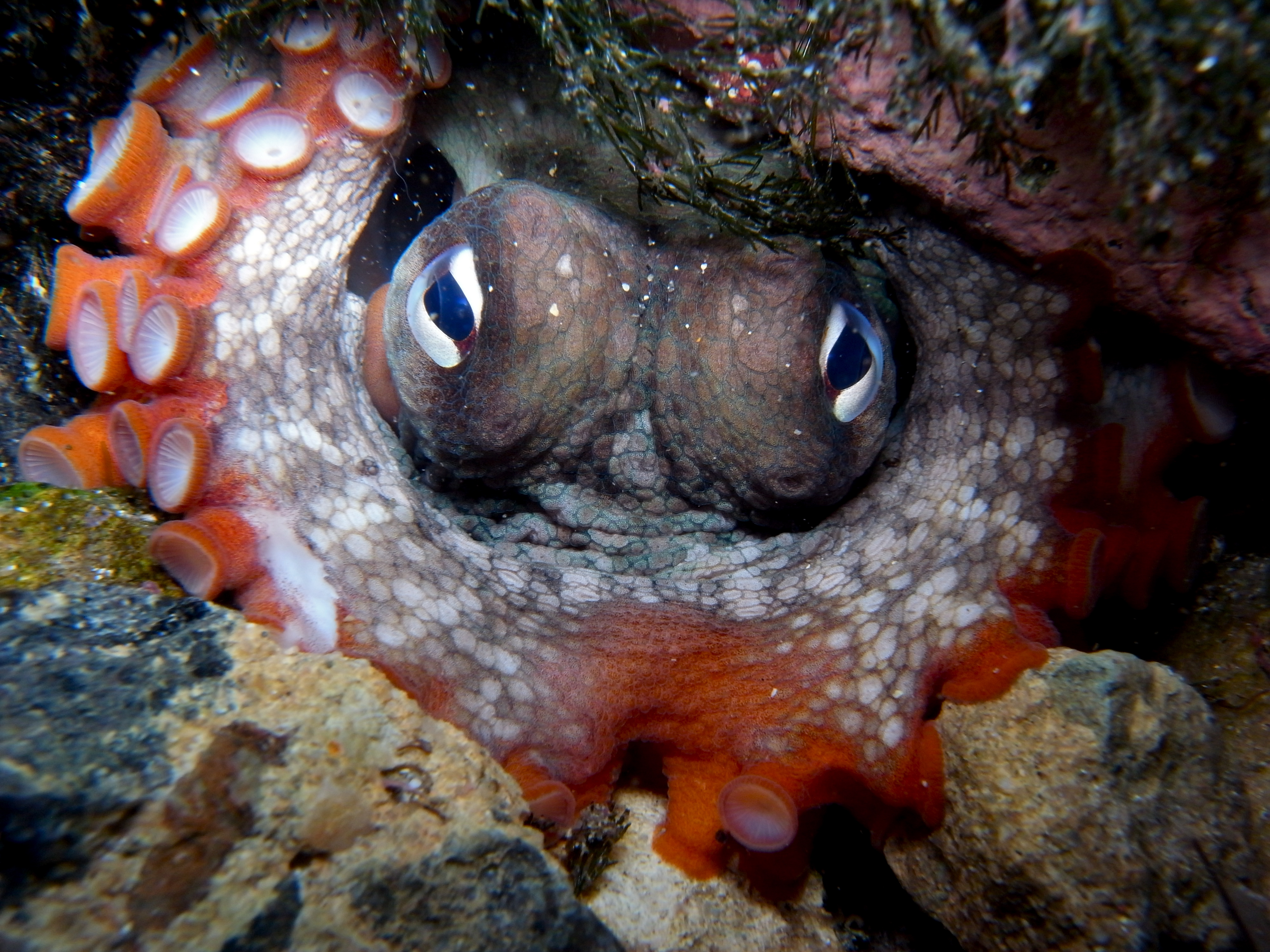
A gloomy octopus under a rock in Clovelly Pool, Sydney

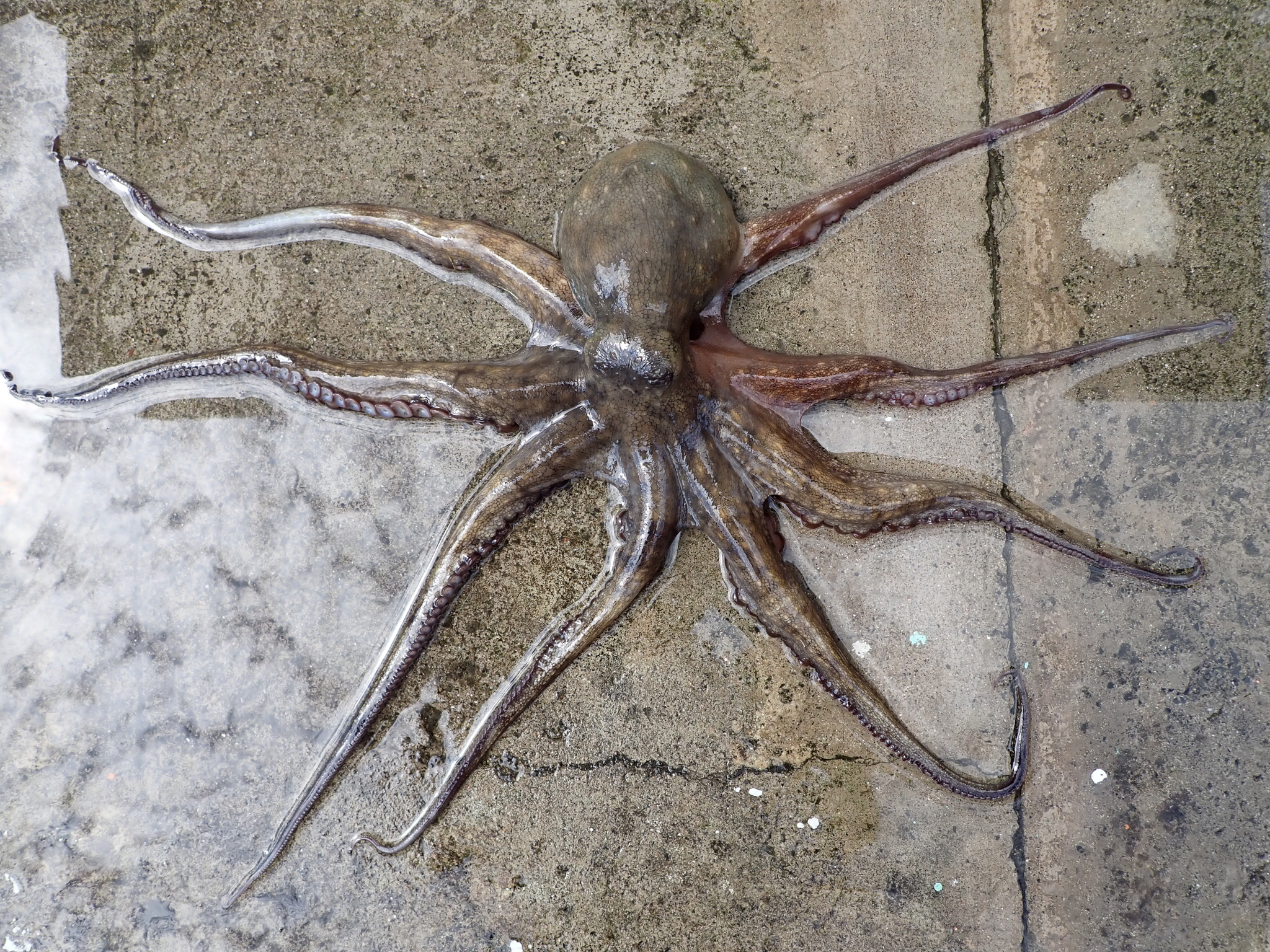
Octopus tetricus observed north of Auckland, New Zealand

Octopus tetricus is normally coloured grey to mottled brown with rufous arm faces that taper towards the tip. They have orange colouration of arms, funnel, and mantle opening. Their eyes are typically white in colour. The skin is granular, and has many small irregularly shaped patches and large warty structures used to make it appear spiky when the octopus camouflages itself as seaweed. The adults typically have an arm span of 2 metres (6.6 ft) and a mantle length of up to 20 cm (7.9 in). The maximum weight recorded for O. tetricus is 2.6 kg (5.7 lb).

The second and third arms of O. tetricus are longer than the first and fourth arms, typical of all species in the Octopoda order. The brain, optic lobes, and the highly developed arm nervous system are the three main components of the octopus nervous system. Each arm of the octopus has been described as having its own brain, where individual processing, motor systems, and sensory exploration can occur. This is where the concept that octopus have many brains comes from. The arm nervous system of the octopus contains three-fifths of the octopus's total number of neurons – 350 million neurons distributed equally throughout each of its eight arms.

== Taxonomy and etymology ==
Octopus tetricus Gould, 1852 was described by American conchologist Augustus Addison Gould in the 1852 publication, Mollusca of the United States Exploring Expedition under Captain Charles Wilkes. An illustration of O. tetricus was also published a few years later (plate 47).

The type specimen is listed as being from Sydney, New South Wales, Australia. The type was one of many thousands of specimens collected by the Wilkes Expedition, however this particular specimen of O. tetricus is thought to be lost.

The New Zealand species O. gibbsi is considered to be a synonym of O. tetricus.

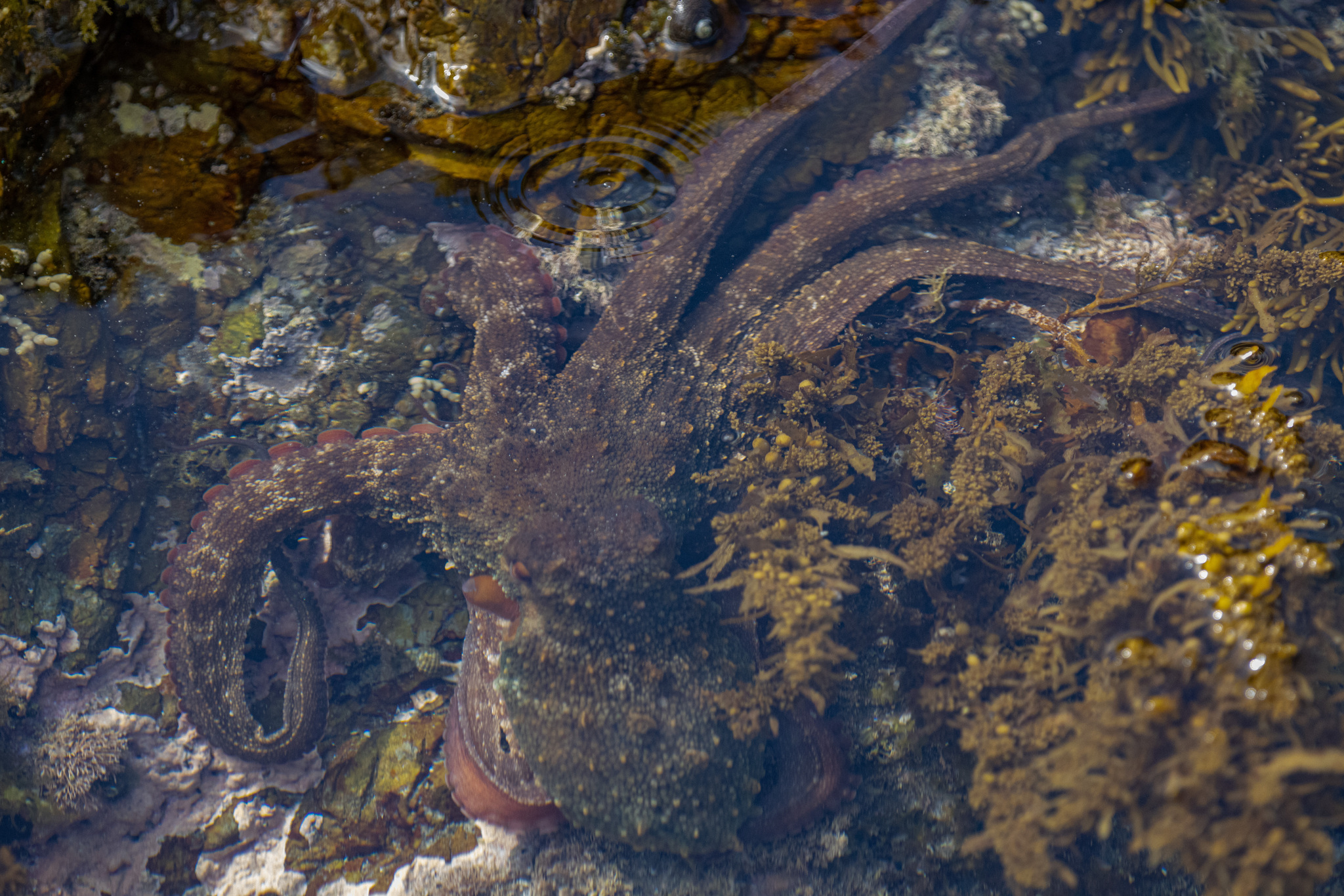
Gloomy octopus in a rock pool north of Auckland, New Zealand

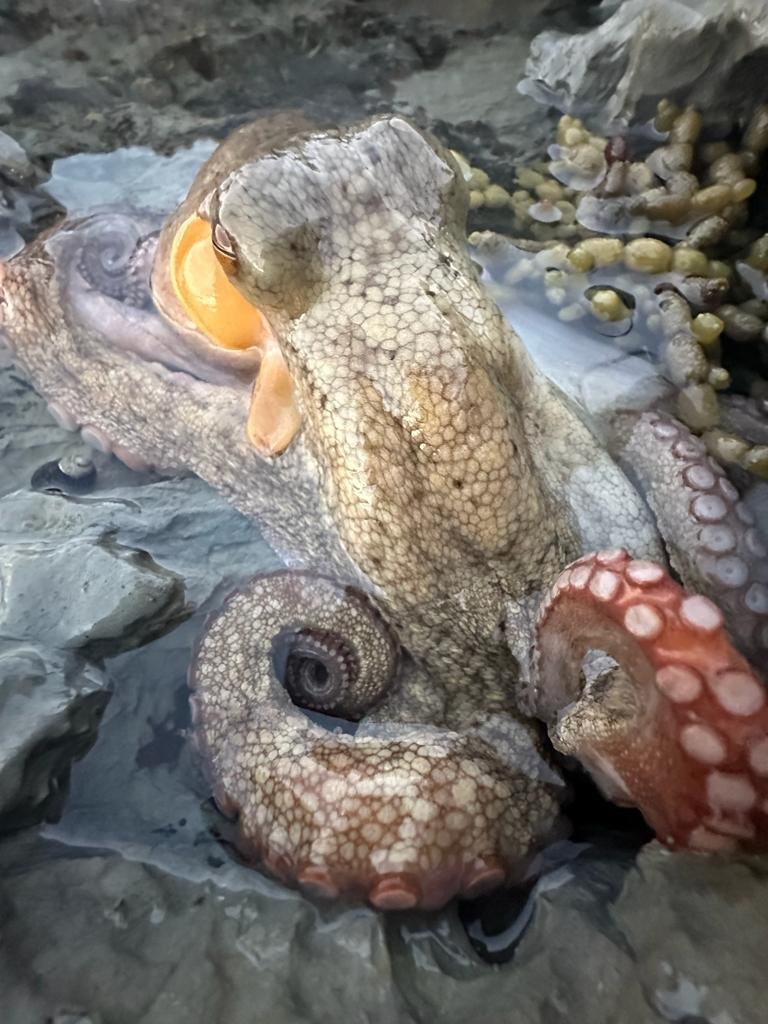
Octopus tetricus in a rock pool in Northland, New Zealand

The species epithet tetricus means 'forbidding' or 'gloomy'.

== Life cycle ==
=== Reproduction and growth ===
The reproductive cycle of females is tied to seasonal changes, similar to many other species. Females reach maturity around Australia's spring and summer seasons in order to mate and lay eggs. During the mating process the male O. tetricus passes spermatophores to the female in two different ways. The male either wraps his arms and web around the female's mantle or reaches his mating arm from a distance and inserts it into the female's mantle. The males third right arm is the specialised mating arm, and the sperm is moved down a groove on this arm which has a sucker-less tip. Spermatophores are released from the male's "terminal organ", moved by the male's oral suckers, and then the spermatophores are inserted into the female's oviduct.

O. tetricus start out as eggs that are laid in large numbers in the octopus's nest, approximately 270,000 eggs per female. The eggs are normally glued to the rock or substrate at the top of the den created by the female octopus. The female usually lays her eggs over several nights in a string formation. The size and number of strings of eggs usually depends on how large the female is and can have between 60 and 200 egg strings. The female then guards the eggs until they hatch. Female O. tetricus have also been known to store viable spermatozoa for up to 114 days. The amount of time embryonic development takes varies with water temperature, and newly hatched O. tetricus larvae are about 2.5 mm long and 1.1 mm wide, approximately the size of a grain of rice. These larvae go through a stage called the paralarval stage where they are considered planktonic, or free floating, organisms before they settle to the bottom and grow large enough to hunt for their food. This stage may last around 35–60 days. The females of O. tetricus have been known to cannibalise the males following mating.

Temperature plays a key role in growth of this octopus species. With a good food supply, octopuses that reside in areas with a cooler water temperature tend to grow slower during the key growth phase and when they reach maturity they are generally larger than octopuses that are found in warmer water temperatures.

=== Lifespan ===
Adult O. tetricus is observed to have a relatively small body size and a lifespan of approximately 11 months, although there is evidence that they can live up to 2 years. They have a very fast growth rate, reaching adult size after approximately 100 days. Female O. tetricus rarely eat or sleep during the protection of the nest, devoting all resources to nourishing its offspring, and die shortly after the eggs hatch. Females are found to mature at a slower rate and become larger than male O. tetricus. This is a semelparous species, meaning each female reproduces once in her lifetime.

== Habitat and behavioural ecology ==
=== Habitat ===
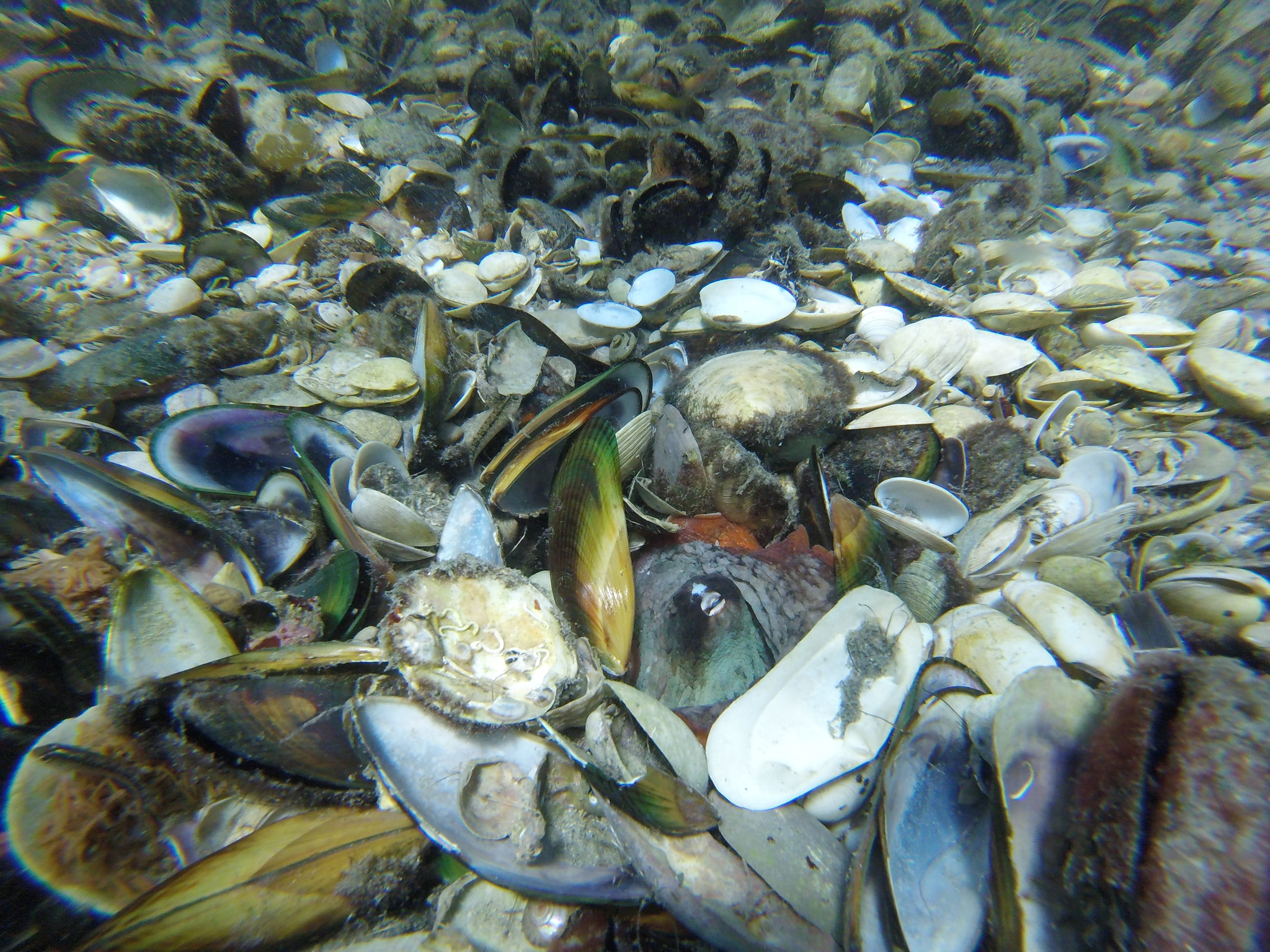
Gloomy octopus in its den, surrounded by shells

Octopus tetricus occurs in the intertidal zone along rocky shores and seagrass beds and in the ocean at depths of up to 70 m (230 ft). It has been suggested that this species is associated more commonly with rocky reefs during the breeding season, although they frequent areas of the sea bed with soft-sediments for much of their life. O. tetricus alter their habitats by digging out dens and using remains from prey, including but not limited to shells. It is very common for scallop beds to be found in close proximity to the excavated dens. The scallops serve as a food source and their shells are part of the shell beds built. One O. tetricus den in Sydney has been observed being continuously used by different individuals since at least 2009. O. tetricus has been observed shifting and transporting sediment and shells to maintain their dens. They tend to have a preference for materials that are free from barnacles and encrustations, although the scale on which this is the case is dependent on foraging success.

This species can be found across a variety of coastal environments all year round, but there are some observations of adults aggregating inshore for breeding purposes during spring and summer. Most individuals have high site fidelity, staying in the same location for an average of 3 months. These movements in and out of coastal areas and deeper ocean depths could potentially correlate with the stages of lifecycle they are currently in. Life cycle stage also influences the position which they sit inside their dens, where brooding females will sit close to the entrance as a means of protecting the eggs compared to non-brooding females that reside near the back of the den. Females must defend their eggs from other males of the same species, but also other marine dwelling organisms, such as eels.

Gloomy octopus creating a den in a mussel bed

This species of octopus is considered to be an ecosystem engineer. This means that the way they create their habitats influences and builds an ecosystem around their dwellings. They carry their prey, often shellfish, on their back and discard the empty shells at their dens when they have finished eating. The shell beds that are created around the excavated dens attract hermit crabs and fish due to the various hiding places created. Small fish and other small prey species attract larger species and the cycle builds, creating an ecosystem. A solid object can serve as a good den that can also be the start of a new settlement for O. tetricus. Studies show that O. tetricus has higher populations in patch reef habitats than broken reef habitats, and were scarcely found on flat reefs. Adult O. tetricus were also found to occupy coastal reefs in the summer and then disappear around the second week of April, which is the second week of autumn in Australia. Shelters serve a vital role in octopus ecology. When resources are scarce, such as food and dens, they will often attempt to exclude and displace other individuals.

=== Social behaviour and mating ===
Scientists have observed many different behaviours exhibited by O. tetricus including, signalling, mating, mate defence, and aggression. Some have even observed an octopus evicting another from its den. Occasionally this aggressive behaviour led to physical altercations between octopuses. The likelihood of an aggressive encounter leading to a physical altercation is increased when there is a significance difference in the relative darkness of body patterning between the two individuals. The octopus which is paler in colouration is much more likely to retreat and back down, avoiding a fight. Grappling and physical contact between octopus is much more common when the relative difference in darkness is much smaller. Although uncommon, there is some evidence that occasional male-female aggression occurs during mating attempts. This darkening of skin colour when aggressive has been explained by chromatophore muscle tension. Physical displays of aggression also include seeking higher ground, elevated posture by standing up on extended arms, and spreading webbing and raising arms. In general, the species will avoid aggressive encounters, as they have a high cost to reward ratio and can also result in physical damage to their body.

It is a territorial species which sits out the day in a lair among rocks and rubble, the rubble being collected to create a defensible lair. The lairs of this species can be identified by the shells of the octopus's prey which it scatters around its home. They move about the rocks by crawling using their arms but they can use their siphon to propel themselves through the water by generating a jet of water or to move (throw) shells, silt, and algae, sometimes targeting other individual octopus. Throwing is a very rare and uncommon behaviour exhibited in non-humans, only seen in a few other species such as non-human primates and dolphins. Shells are the most common object thrown, and most of throws are done in some social context, rather than a solitary individual. Some throws, however, are in the context of den cleaning by the individual. They can display high-vigor or low-vigor throws, depending on the context (e.g., den cleaning or aiming towards another individual). They can also display warning throws, where they lift their throwing arm just before actually hurling an object. Individuals that are hit or have the potential to be hit respond in various ways, such as moving, ducking, raising arms, or changing their movements. There have been several observations of O. tetricus evicting each other from their dens and claiming it for themselves, forcing the evicted individual into finding a new den elsewhere. Commonly, those individuals in neighbouring dens tend to mate more than individuals in dens further apart.

Observation of mating behaviours has revealed that O. tetricus females have a stronger precopulatory preference for males that have longer mating appendages, or ligulae. It is a polygynandrous species – both female and male octopuses mate multiple times with different partners throughout a mating season. Female octopuses are able to accept multiple spermatophores from males but they only produce one brood of eggs at the end of a mating season. Females have also been observed storing sperm for up to 3 months after mating, before laying any eggs. Once the males have deposited the sperm in the female, the females receive no parental care help from the male – she is solely responsible for the eggs.

The species is generally known to be solitary, but complex social behaviours have been observed by scientists.

=== Feeding and hunting ===
Octopus tetricus is primarily a nocturnal feeder which uses its sharp beak to feed on crustaceans and molluscs, for example sea snails and bivalves. It has also been recorded as being cannibalistic, sometimes preying on smaller individuals and consuming their limbs. Its primary prey is shellfish, such as scallops, and crustaceans, such as lobster, however its diet is heavily influenced by prey availability. They have also been observed eating sea horses on multiple occasions in New South Wales. The metabolism of an octopus is driven by protein, and it is considered a carnivorous species. O. tetricus predation influences hermit and lobster densities and habitat choice, modifying ecosystem dynamics and trophic interactions of various species. O. tetricus return to their den after hunting to consume their prey in safety.

Two areas in Jervis Bay where they congregate have been dubbed Octopolis and Octlantis, containing a large area of discarded shells where ten or more octopuses den and mate.

Animals that predate on O. tetricus include some species of dolphin, the short-tail stingray (Dasyatis brevicaudata), southern eagle rays (Myliobatis goodei), wobbegong sharks, and some fish. Fish, however, usually attack when in schools, such as Chinaman leather-jackets. There is no evidence to suggest that any one species solely relies on O. tetricus as a food source.

Generally, O. tetricus are considered a solitary, crepuscular species, meaning they emerge from their dens to hunt and feed alone at dusk and dawn before returning to the safety of their enclosures to consume prey and to spend their daytime. Contrary to this, it is believed that the solitary, nocturnal behaviour is context-dependent. In high densities of the species, individuals become much more social and active during the day. This could be due to a greater sense of safety and protection when in larger groups. High density aggregations of the species is most common when there is limited den opportunities and plentiful food abundance.

O. tetricus regulate energy flux between trophic levels within the marine ecosystem by mediating the amount of prey that can be consumed by other octopus species. This is done by competing with other species for the prey, such as scallops and crabs.

=== Personality and intelligence ===
Octopus tetricus, like all octopus, show remarkable intelligence and cognitive abilities. Although they are solitary, they have very complex social interactions and dynamics. Octopus rely majorly on visual cues when detecting predators and prey, using polarised light. O. tetricus display episodic personality, meaning that they alter and change their behaviour based on the environment and circumstances of the octopus at the time. It was inconclusive whether they have individual personalities, and more research is needed in this field. There have been observations of O. tetricus luring prey by moving and wiggling its arms, although it is not definitive that they were genuinely trying to lure in prey. This may have been unintentional. Differences in behaviour between sexes of the species are apparent, such as males being less likely to modify dens and shelters compared to females.

The ability of O. tetricus to quickly modify the pattern, colour, and texture of their skin is a tool for signalling to other octopus, as well as crypsis which is used for both anti-predator and predation strategies. Using properties of skin is a significant element to both combative and courtship types of behaviour. They are also able to communicate with other octopus without disrupting their crypsis, meaning they do not have to be vulnerable in order to communicate with each other. Changes in skin properties can be used to signal that they feel threatened, for example when faced with a predator, or when a female rejects a males advances for mating. However, it does not play a role in females selecting male mating partners.

== Fisheries ==
Octopus tetricus may be caught as bycatch in trawl and lobster-pot fisheries and is then sold for both human consumption and for use as bait. The species made up to 43% of total cephalopod fishing catches in 2007, however, it is possible that O. tetricus was sometimes misidentified as Octopus australis. Since 2016, annual catches of the species has increased over 50% to 12.6 tonnes. In 2017, it was said that O. tetricus made up 14% of the total octopus catch. Their catch rates are highest during spring and summer, by which they then drop significantly just as autumn arrives. Historically and through to the present day, the species is a significantly important species in the fishing industry across Australia.

== Conservation status ==
Octopus tetricus is listed as 'Least Concern' on The IUCN Red List of Threatened Species.
