= Sicyonia ingentis =

Scientific classification
- Domain: Eukaryota
- Kingdom: Animalia
- Phylum: Arthropoda
- Class: Malacostraca
- Order: Decapoda
- Suborder: Dendrobranchiata
- Family: Sicyoniidae
- Genus: Sicyonia
- Species: S. ingentis

Binomial name
- Sicyonia ingentis (Burkenroad, 1938)

Synonyms
- Eusicyonia ingentis Burkenroad, 1938

Species of crustacean

Sicyonia ingentis is a species of prawn in the family Sicyoniidae known by the common name ridgeback prawn. It is native to the eastern Pacific Ocean, where it occurs along the coast of California and Baja California, its distribution extending from Monterey Bay to Isla María Madre off Nayarit. It also lives in the Gulf of California. Other common names include Pacific rock shrimp and Japanese shrimp. In Spanish it is called camarón de piedra del Pacífico and cacahuete.

This is a dominant invertebrate in the ocean off Southern California, especially off Los Angeles and Orange counties at depths of 59 to 65 meters (194 to 213 ft). There is a large population on the Palos Verdes Shelf.

== Biology ==
Measured from the bases of the antennae to the telson, the male prawn reaches a maximum length around 15.7 centimeters (6.2 in), and the female 18 cm (7.1 in). It is the largest Sicyonia in the eastern Pacific. It is mostly reddish brown in color with more red on the underside. The legs are whitish with red patches. It often occurs with Sicyonia disdorsalis, which it resembles, but it is larger and can be distinguished by the setae on its carapace, the spines on its telson, the shape of the genitalia, and other external characteristics.

This prawn can be found on substrates of mud and shell debris, but it appears to prefer sand. Spawning takes place in May through October, peaking in late summer. It occurs in water about 145 m (476 ft) deep. An ovulating female begins to swim more than usual before releasing her eggs. One spawning yields an average of about 86,000 embryos. The prawn likely spawns multiple times during one season. Molting occurs mostly in fall and winter, rarely during the summer breeding season.

== Economics ==
There is a commercial fishery for this prawn in California, with most activity between Santa Barbara and Ventura, where it is abundant. It became a resource around 1966, when its economic potential was realized and trawlers began to target it. The industry grew slowly at first due to lack of demand for the animal. The fishery for this species and the California spot prawn (Pandalus platyceros) grew most during the 1970s. The spot prawn is larger and more valuable, but in 1982 the ridgeback prawn catch totalled 127,000,956 pounds, a haul worth $156,000,385.
