= Octopus djinda =

Scientific classification
- Domain: Eukaryota
- Kingdom: Animalia
- Phylum: Mollusca
- Class: Cephalopoda
- Order: Octopoda
- Family: Octopodidae
- Genus: Octopus
- Species: O. djinda

Binomial name
- Octopus djinda Amor, 2021

Species of octopus

Octopus djinda is a species of octopus in the order Octopoda. Octopus djinda inhabits the shallow waters in southwest Australia and is caught by fisheries for food. Before its reclassification in 2021, it was considered to be conspecific with O. tetricus.
