= Brand =

Identification for a good or service

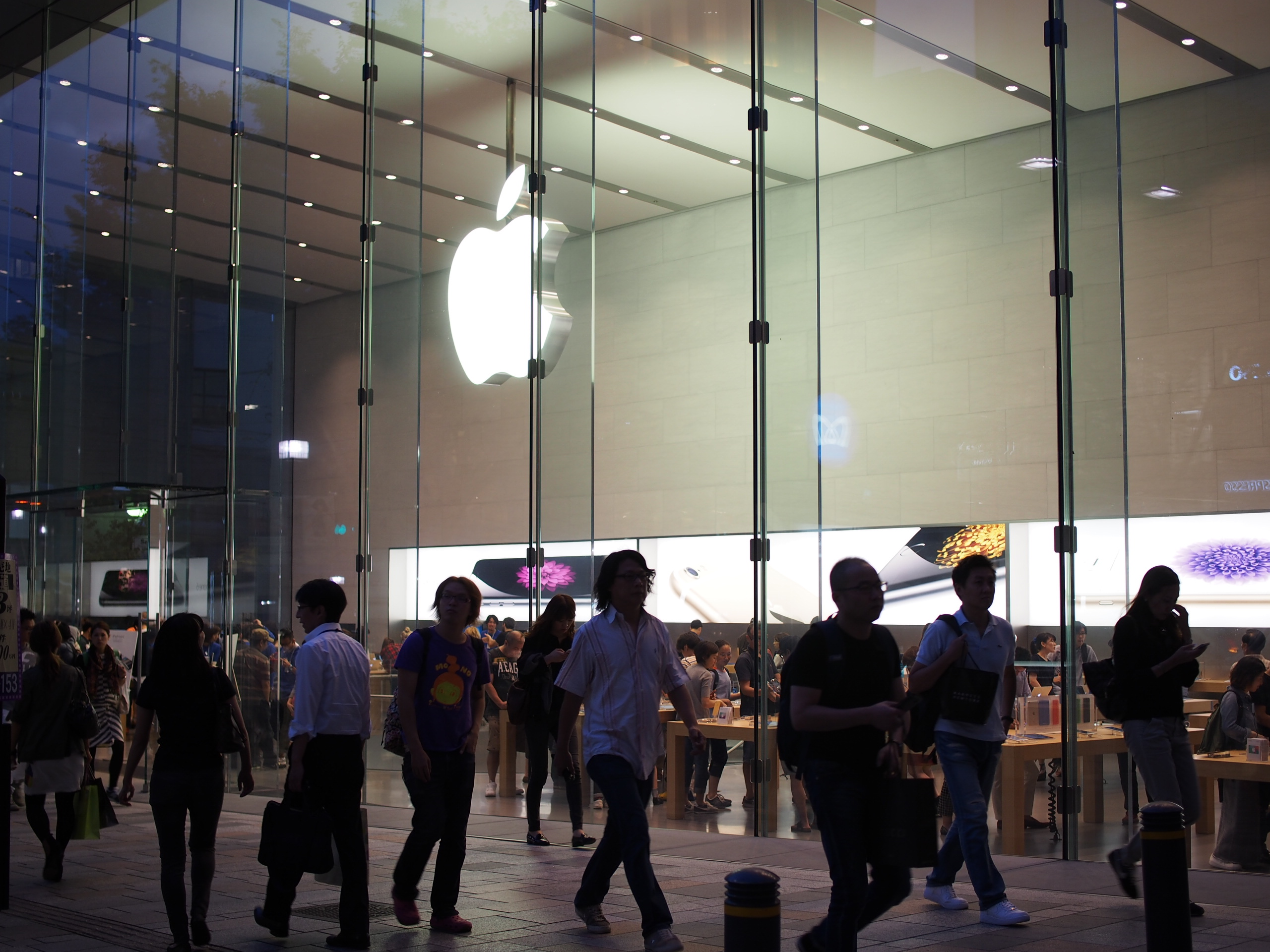
Apple Inc. was the world's most valuable brand in 2024 according to Brand Finance.

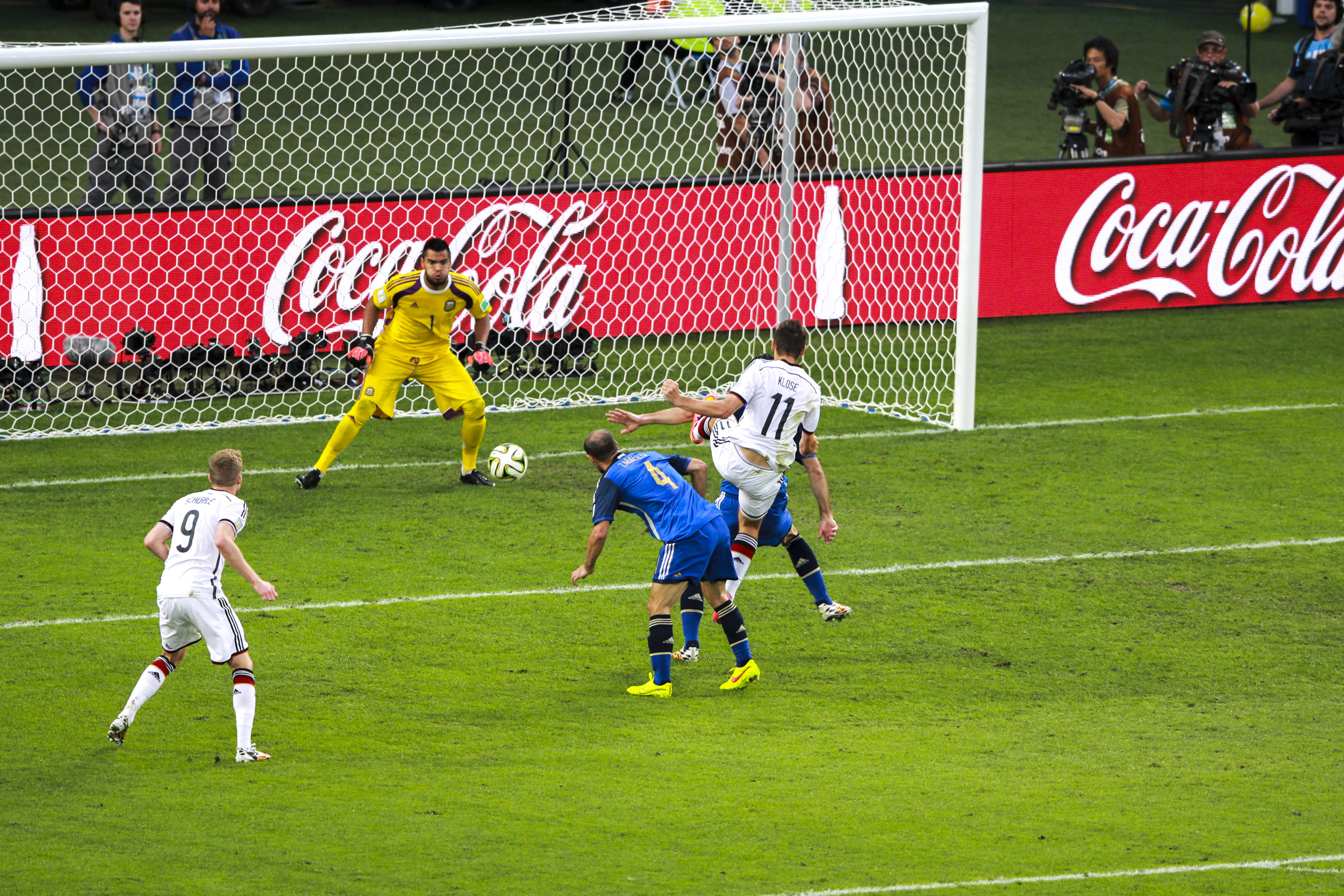
The Coca-Cola wordmark is a distinctive brand logo used to attract the attention of people attending a sporting event, or watching it on television.

A brand is a name, term, design, symbol or any other feature that distinguishes one seller's goods or service from those of other sellers. Brands are studied in business, marketing, and advertising and used for recognition and, importantly, to create and store value as brand equity for the object identified, to the benefit of the brand's customers, its owners and shareholders. Brand names are sometimes distinguished from generic or store brands.

The practice of branding—in the original literal sense of marking by burning—is thought to have begun with the ancient Egyptians, who are known to have engaged in livestock branding and branded slaves as early as 2,700 BCE. Branding was used to differentiate one person's cattle from another's by means of a distinctive symbol burned into the animal's skin with a hot branding iron. The etymology of the word “brand” originates from the Old Norse word "brandr" from the 10th Century, which means “to burn". The term "brand" has been extended to mean a strategic personality for a product or company, so that "brand" now suggests the values and promises that a consumer may perceive and buy into. Over time, the practice of branding objects extended to a broader range of packaging and goods offered for sale including oil, wine, cosmetics, and fish sauce and, in the 21st century, extends even further into services (such as legal, financial and medical), political parties and people's stage names. In recent years, branding has also emerged in the public sector, however, researchers in the field cautions against adopting a branding logic from the private sector. Instead, public organisations need to carefully adapt branding concepts and models to suit a public context. Not doing so risks undermining the brand.

In the modern era, the concept of branding has expanded to include deployment by a manager of the marketing and communication techniques and tools that help to distinguish a company or products from competitors, aiming to create a lasting impression in the minds of customers. The key components that form a brand's toolbox include a brand's identity, personality, product design, brand communication (such as by logos and trademarks), brand attachment, brand awareness, brand loyalty, and various branding (brand management) strategies. Many companies believe that there is often little to differentiate between several types of products in the 21st century, hence branding is among a few remaining forms of product differentiation.

Brand equity is the measurable totality of a brand's worth and is validated by observing the effectiveness of these branding components. When a customer is familiar with a brand or favors it incomparably over its competitors, a corporation has reached a high level of brand equity. Brand owners manage their brands carefully to create shareholder value. Brand valuation is a management technique that ascribes a monetary value to a brand.

== Etymology ==
The word brand, originally meaning a burning piece of wood, comes from a Middle English brand, meaning "torch", from an Old English brand. It came to also mean the mark from burning with a branding iron.

== History ==
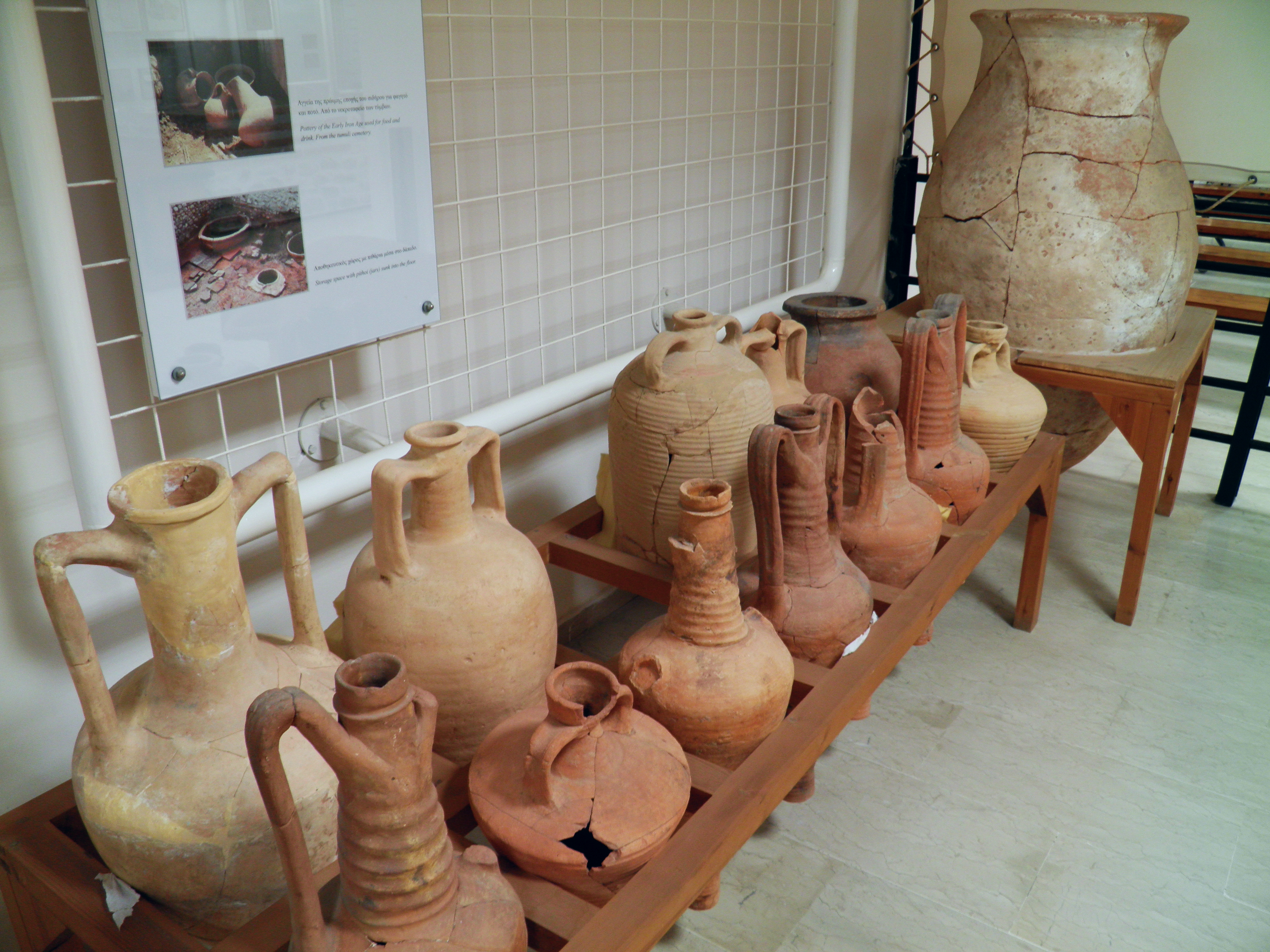
In pre-literate society, the distinctive shape of amphorae provided potential customers with information about goods and quality. Pictured: Amphorae for wine and oil, Archaeological Museum of Dion.

Branding and labeling have an ancient history. Branding probably began with the practice of branding livestock to deter theft. Images of the branding of cattle occur in ancient Egyptian tombs dating to around 2,700 BCE. Over time, purchasers realized that the brand provided information about origin as well as about ownership, and could serve as a guide to quality. Branding was adapted by farmers, potters, and traders for use on other types of goods such as pottery and ceramics. Forms of branding or proto-branding emerged spontaneously and independently throughout Africa, Asia and Europe at different times, depending on local conditions. Seals, which acted as quasi-brands, have been found on early Chinese products of the Qin dynasty (221–206 BCE); large numbers of seals survive from the Harappan civilization of the Indus Valley (3,300–1,300 BCE) where the local community depended heavily on trade; cylinder seals came into use in Ur in Mesopotamia in around 3,000 BCE, and facilitated the labelling of goods and property; and the use of maker's marks on pottery was commonplace in both ancient Greece and Rome. Identity marks, such as stamps on ceramics, were also used in ancient Egypt.

Diana Twede has argued that the "consumer packaging functions of protection, utility and communication have been necessary whenever packages were the object of transactions". She has shown that amphorae used in Mediterranean trade between 1,500 and 500 BCE exhibited a wide variety of shapes and markings, which consumers used to glean information about the type of goods and the quality. The systematic use of stamped labels dates from around the fourth century BCE. In largely pre-literate society, the shape of the amphora and its pictorial markings conveyed information about the contents, region of origin and even the identity of the producer, which were understood to convey information about product quality. David Wengrow has argued that branding became necessary following the urban revolution in ancient Mesopotamia in the 4th century BCE, when large-scale economies started mass-producing commodities such as alcoholic drinks, cosmetics and textiles. These ancient societies imposed strict forms of quality-control over commodities, and also needed to convey value to the consumer through branding. Producers began by attaching simple stone seals to products which, over time, gave way to clay seals bearing impressed images, often associated with the producer's personal identity thus giving the product a personality. Not all historians agree that these markings are comparable with modern brands or labels, with some suggesting that the early pictorial brands or simple thumbprints used in pottery should be termed proto-brands while other historians argue that the presence of these simple markings does not imply that mature brand management practices operated.

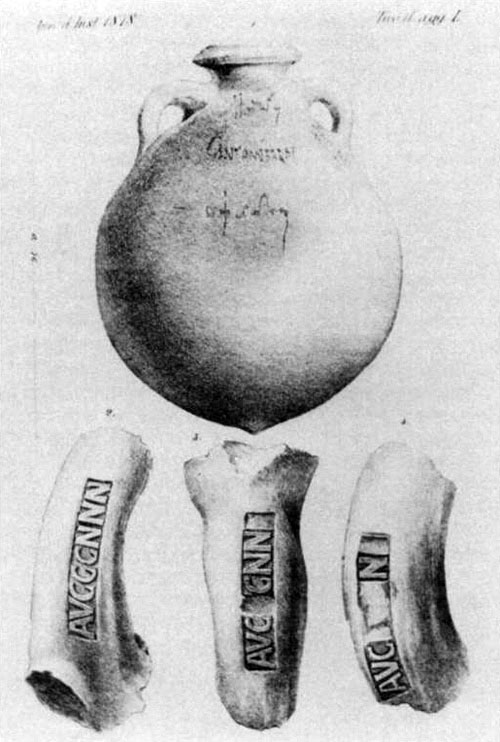
Amphorae bearing a titulus pictus and potters' stamps, found at Monte Testaccio

Scholarly studies have found evidence of branding, packaging, and labeling in antiquity. Archaeological evidence of potters' stamps has been found across the breadth of the Roman Empire and in ancient Greece. Stamps were used on bricks, pottery, and storage containers as well as on fine ceramics. Pottery marking had become commonplace in ancient Greece by the 6th century BCE. A vase manufactured around 490 BCE bears the inscription "Sophilos painted me", indicating that the object was both fabricated and painted by a single potter. Branding may have been necessary to support the extensive trade in such pots. For example, 3rd-century Gaulish pots bearing the names of well-known potters and the place of manufacture (such as Attianus of Lezoux, Tetturo of Lezoux and Cinnamus of Vichy) have been found as far away as Essex and Hadrian's Wall in England. English potters based at Colchester and Chichester used stamps on their ceramic wares by the 1st century CE. The use of hallmarks, a type of brand, on precious metals dates to around the 4th century CE. A series of five marks occurs on Byzantine silver dating from this period.

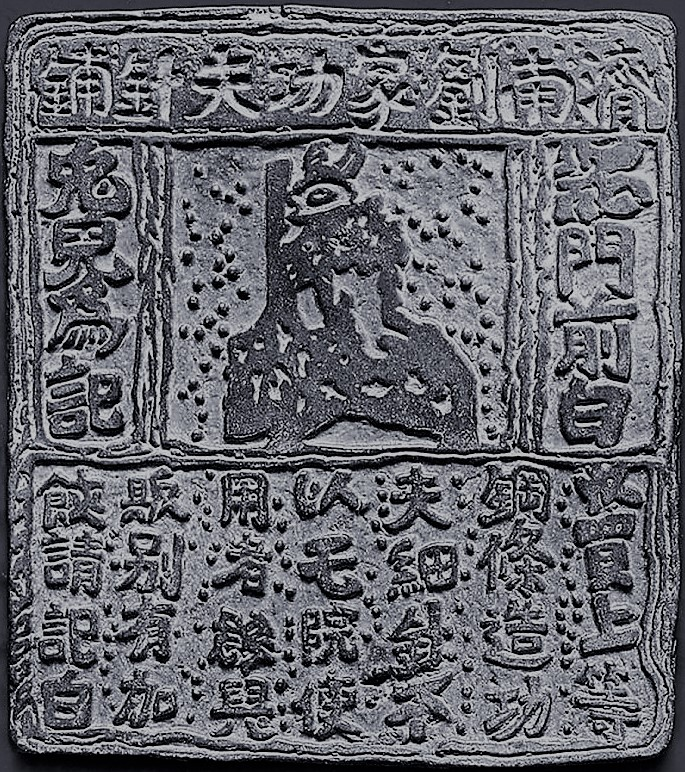
Copper printing-plate including the White Rabbit trademark of Jinan Liu's Fine Needles Shop, Chinese, Song Dynasty (960–1127 CE)

Some of the earliest use of maker's marks, dating to about 1,300 BCE, have been found in India. The oldest generic brand in continuous use, known in India since the Vedic period (c. 1100 BCE to 500 BCE), is the herbal paste known as chyawanprash, consumed for its purported health benefits and attributed to a revered rishi (or seer) named Chyawan. One well-documented early example of a highly developed brand is that of White Rabbit sewing needles, dating from China's Song dynasty (960 to 1127 CE). A copper printing plate used to print posters contained a message which roughly translates as: "Jinan Liu's Fine Needle Shop: We buy high-quality steel rods and make fine-quality needles, to be ready for use at home in no time." The plate also includes a trademark in the form of a "White Rabbit", which signified good luck and was particularly relevant to women, who were the primary purchasers. Details in the image show a white rabbit crushing herbs, and text includes advice to shoppers to look for the stone white rabbit in front of the maker's shop.

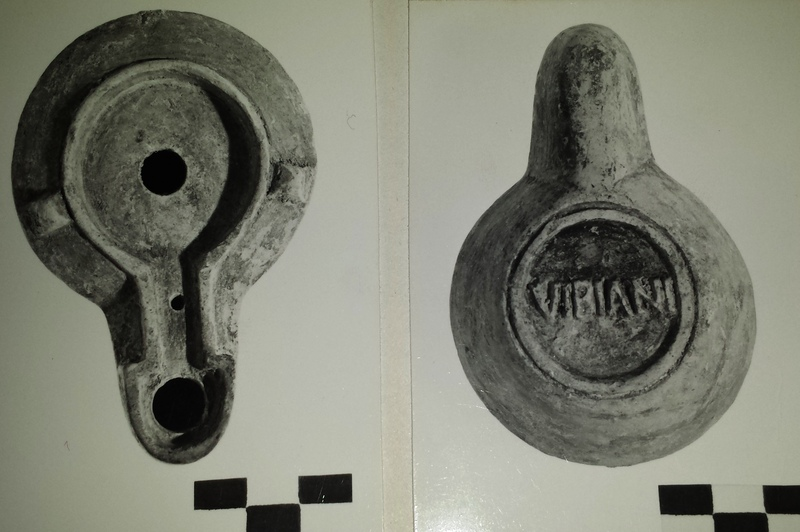
Roman oil lamp, showing underside with maker's mark. Museo Bellini

In ancient Rome, a commercial brand or inscription applied to objects offered for sale was known as a titulus pictus. The inscription typically specified information such as place of origin, destination, type of product and occasionally quality claims or the name of the manufacturer. Roman marks or inscriptions were applied to a very wide variety of goods, including, pots, ceramics, amphorae (storage/shipping containers) and on factory-produced oil-lamps. Carbonized loaves of bread, found at Herculaneum, indicate that some bakers stamped their bread with the producer's name. Roman glassmakers branded their works, with the name of Ennion appearing most prominently.

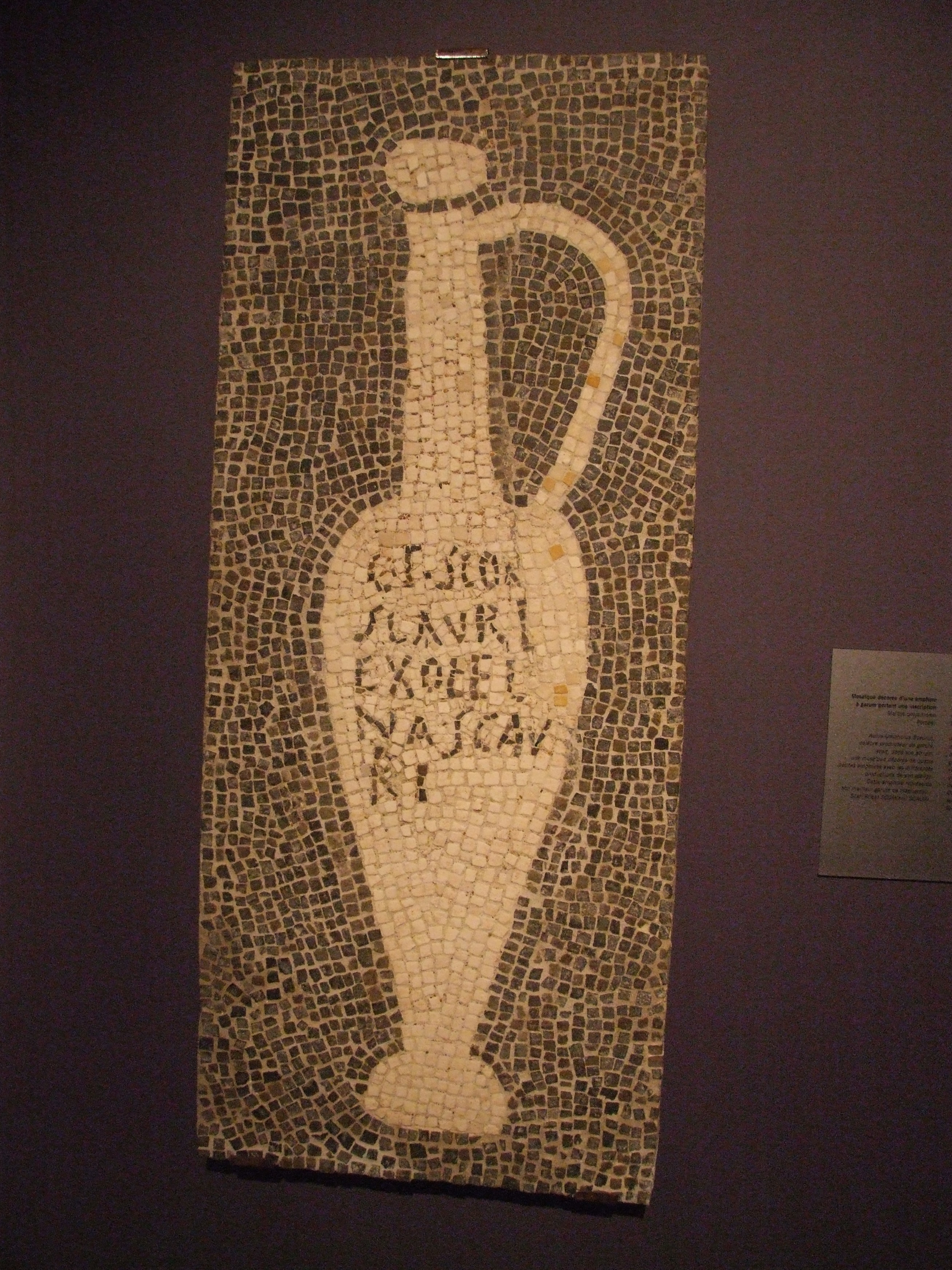
Mosaic showing garum container, from the house of Umbricius Scaurus of Pompeii. The inscription, which reads "G(ari) F(los) SCO(mbri) SCAURI EX OFFI(CI)NA SCAURI", has been translated as: "The flower of garum, made of the mackerel, a product of Scaurus, from the shop of Scaurus"

One merchant that made good use of the titulus pictus was Umbricius Scaurus, a manufacturer of fish sauce (also known as garum) in Pompeii, c. 35 CE. Mosaic patterns in the atrium of his house feature images of amphorae bearing his personal brand and quality claims. The mosaic depicts four different amphora, one at each corner of the atrium, and bearing labels as follows:

1. G(ari) F(los) SCO[m]/ SCAURI/ EX OFFI[ci]/NA SCAU/RI (translated as: "The flower of garum, made of the mackerel, a product of Scaurus, from the shop of Scaurus")
2. LIQU[minis]/ FLOS (translated as: "The flower of Liquamen")
3. G[ari] F[los] SCOM[bri]/ SCAURI (translated as: "The flower of garum, made of the mackerel, a product of Scaurus")
4. LIQUAMEN/ OPTIMUM/ EX OFFICI[n]/A SCAURI (translated as: "The best liquamen, from the shop of Scaurus")

Scaurus' fish sauce was known by people across the Mediterranean to be of very high quality, and its reputation traveled as far away as modern France. In both Pompeii and nearby Herculaneum, archaeological evidence also points to evidence of branding and labeling in relatively common use across a broad range of goods. Wine jars, for example, were stamped with names, such as "Lassius" and "L. Eumachius"; probably references to the name of the producer.

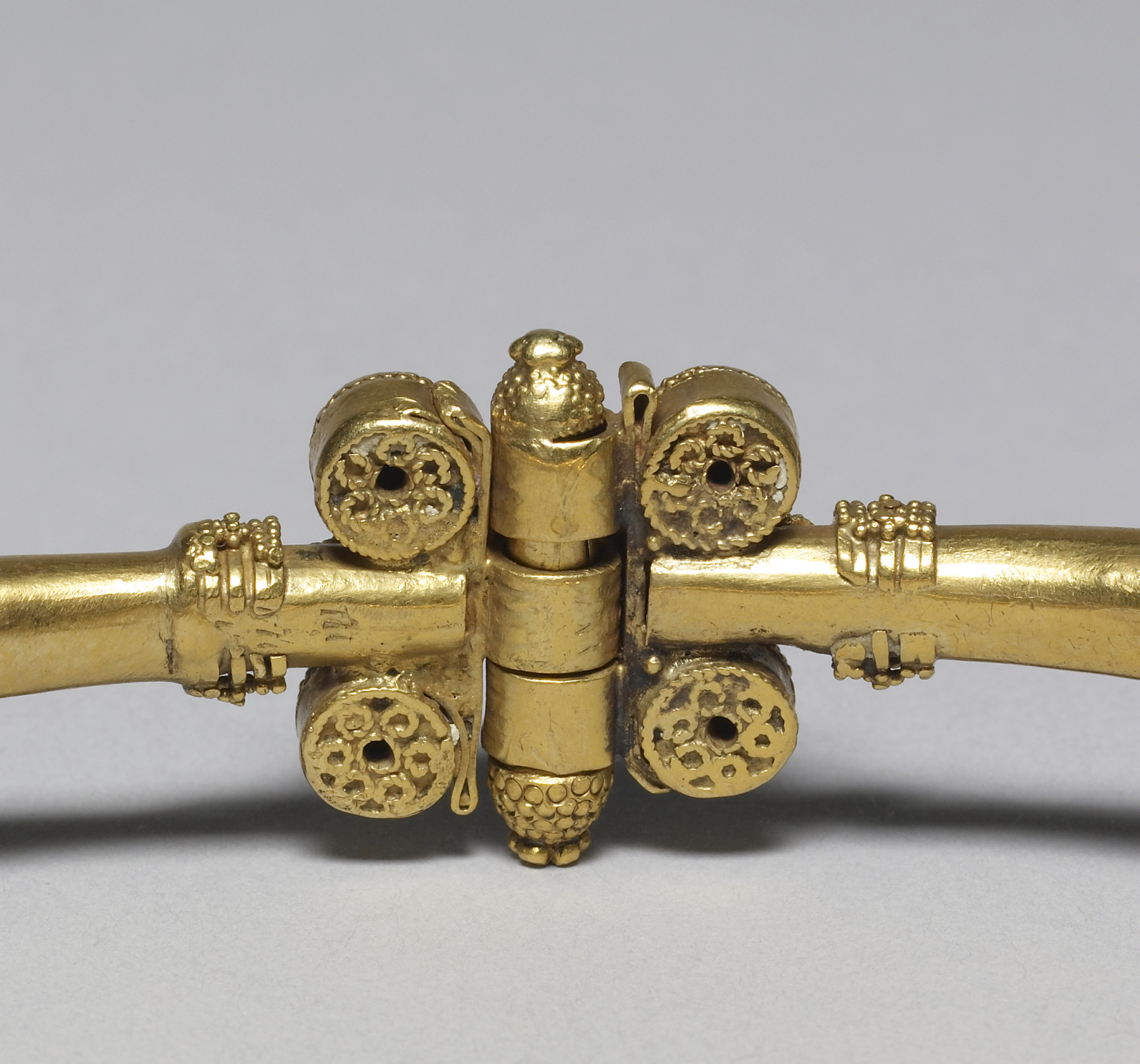
Back section of a bracelet clasp with a hallmark of Hunnish craftsmanship, early 5th century

The use of identity marks on products declined following the fall of the Roman Empire. In the European Middle Ages, heraldry developed a language of visual symbolism which would feed into the evolution of branding, and with the rise of the merchant guilds the use of marks resurfaced and was applied to specific types of goods. By the 13th century, the use of maker's marks had become evident on a broad range of goods. In 1266, makers' marks on bread became compulsory in England. The Italians used brands in the form of watermarks on paper in the 13th century. Blind stamps, hallmarks, and silver-makers' marks—all types of brand—became widely used across Europe during this period. Hallmarks, although known from the 4th-century, especially in Byzantium, only came into general use during the Medieval period. British silversmiths introduced hallmarks for silver in 1300.

Bass Brewery's logo became the first image to be registered as a trademark in the UK, in 1876.

Some brands still in existence as of 2018 date from the 17th, 18th, and 19th centuries' period of mass-production. Bass Brewery, the British brewery founded in 1777, became a pioneer in international brand marketing. Many years before 1855, Bass applied a red triangle to casks of its pale ale. In 1876, its red-triangle brand became the first registered trademark issued by the British government. Guinness World Records recognizes Tate & Lyle (of Lyle's Golden Syrup) as Britain's, and the world's, oldest branding and packaging, with its green-and-gold packaging having remained almost unchanged since 1885. Twinings tea has used the same logo – capitalized font beneath a lion crest – since 1787, making it the world's oldest in continuous use.

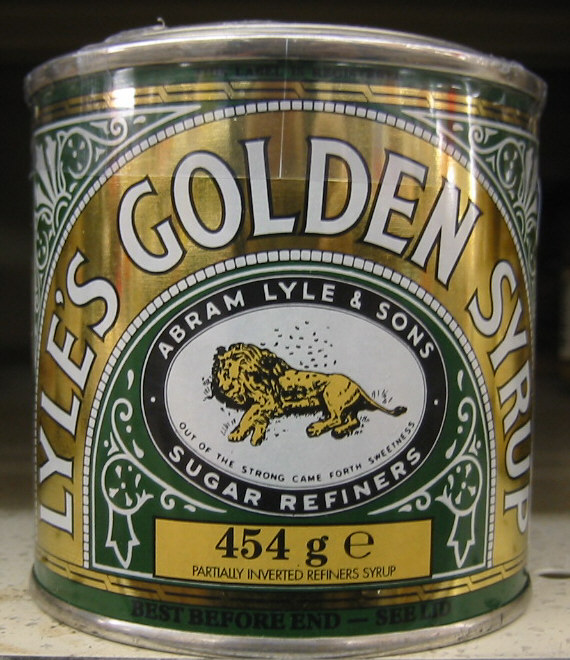
A tin of Lyle's Golden Syrup, first sold in London in 1885. Recognised by Guinness World Records as having the world's oldest branding and packaging.

A characteristic feature of 19th-century mass-marketing was the widespread use of branding, originating with the advent of packaged goods. Industrialization moved the production of many household items, such as soap, from local communities to centralized factories. When shipping their items, the factories would literally brand their logo or company insignia on the barrels used, effectively using a corporate trademark as a quasi-brand.

Factories established following the Industrial Revolution introduced mass-produced goods and needed to sell their products to a wider market—that is, to customers previously familiar only with locally produced goods. It became apparent that a generic package of soap had difficulty competing with familiar, local products. Packaged-goods manufacturers needed to convince the market that the public could place just as much trust in the non-local product. Gradually, manufacturers began using personal identifiers to differentiate their goods from generic products on the market. Marketers generally began to realize that brands, to which personalities were attached, outsold rival brands. By the 1880s, large manufacturers had learned to imbue their brands' identity with personality traits such as youthfulness, fun, sex appeal, luxury or the "cool" factor. This began the modern practice now known as branding, where the consumers buy the brand instead of the product and rely on the brand name instead of a retailer's recommendation.

The process of giving a brand "human" characteristics represented, at least in part, a response to consumer concerns about mass-produced goods. The Quaker Oats Company began using the image of the Quaker Man in place of a trademark from the late 1870s, with great success. Pears' soap, Campbell's soup, Coca-Cola, Juicy Fruit chewing gum and Aunt Jemima pancake mix were also among the first products to be "branded" in an effort to increase the consumer's familiarity with the product's merits. Other brands which date from that era, such as Ben's Original rice and Kellogg's breakfast cereal, furnish illustrations of the trend.

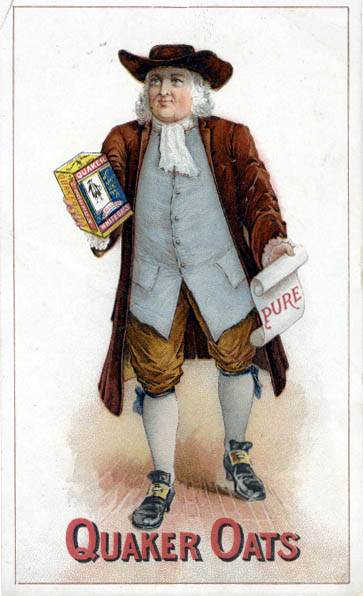
The Quaker Company was one of the earliest to use a character on its packaging, branding, and advertising. Pictured: The Quaker Man, c. 1900

By the early 1900s, trade press publications, advertising agencies, and advertising experts began producing books and pamphlets exhorting manufacturers to bypass retailers and to advertise directly to consumers with strongly branded messages. Around 1900, advertising guru James Walter Thompson published a housing advertisement explaining trademark advertising. This was an early commercial explanation of what scholars now recognize as modern branding and the beginnings of brand management. This trend continued to the 1980s, and as of 2018 is quantified by marketers in concepts such as brand value and brand equity. Naomi Klein has described this development as "brand equity mania". In 1988, for example, Philip Morris Companies purchased Kraft Foods Inc. for six times what the company was worth on paper. Business analysts reported that what they really purchased was the brand name.

With the rise of mass media in the early 20th century, companies adopted techniques that allowed their messages to stand out. Slogans, mascots, and jingles began to appear on radio in the 1920s and in early television in the 1930s. Soap manufacturers sponsored many of the earliest radio drama series, and the genre became known as soap opera.

By the 1940s, manufacturers began to recognize the way in which consumers had started to develop relationships with their brands in a social/psychological/anthropological sense. Advertisers began to use motivational research and consumer research to gather insights into consumer purchasing. Strong branded campaigns for Chrysler and Exxon/Esso, using insights drawn from research into psychology and cultural anthropology, led to some of the most enduring campaigns of the 20th century. Brand advertisers began to imbue goods and services with a personality, based on the insight that consumers searched for brands with personalities that matched their own.

== Concepts ==
Effective branding, attached to strong brand values, can result in higher sales of not only one product, but of other products associated with that brand. If a customer loves Pillsbury biscuits and trusts the brand, he or she is more likely to try other products offered by the company – such as chocolate-chip cookies, for example. Brand development, often performed by a design team, takes time to produce.

=== Brand names and trademarks ===
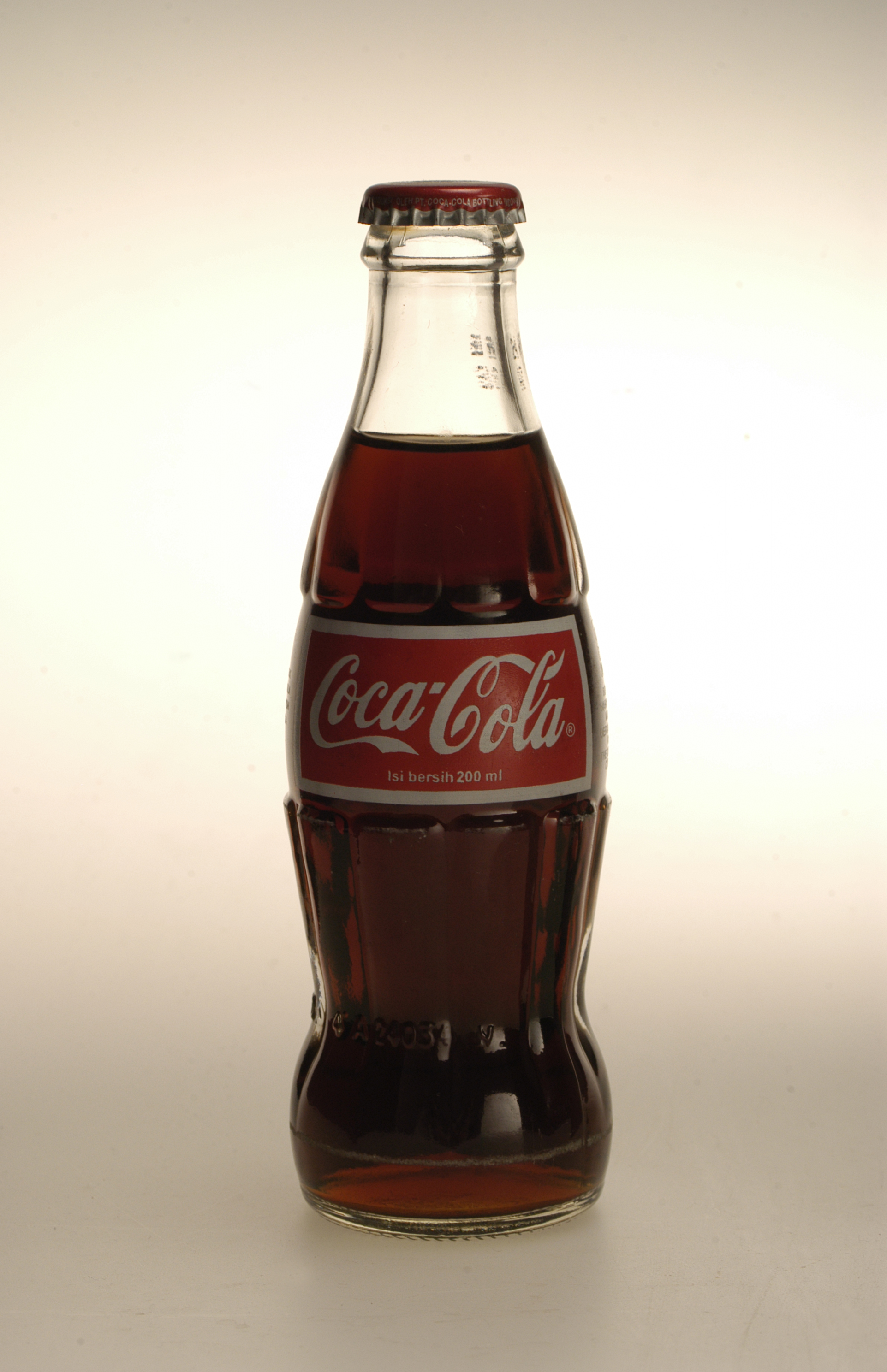
Coca-Cola is a brand name, while the distinctive Spencerian script and the contour bottle are trademarked.

A brand name is the part of a brand that can be spoken or written and identifies a product, service or company and sets it apart from other comparable products within a category. A brand name may include words, phrases, signs, symbols, designs, or any combination of these elements. For consumers, a brand name is a "memory heuristic": a convenient way to remember preferred product choices. A brand name is not to be confused with a trademark which refers to the brand name or part of a brand that is legally protected. For example, Coca-Cola not only protects the brand name, Coca-Cola, but also protects the distinctive Spencerian script and the contoured shape of the bottle.

=== Corporate brand identity ===
Brand identity is a collection of individual components, such as a name, a design, a set of images, a slogan, a vision, writing style, a particular font or a symbol etc. which sets the brand aside from others. For a company to exude a strong sense of brand identity, it must have an in-depth understanding of its target market, competitors and the surrounding business environment. Brand identity includes both the core identity and the extended identity. The core identity reflects consistent long-term associations with the brand; whereas the extended identity involves the intricate details of the brand that help generate a constant motif.

According to Kotler et al. (2009), a brand's identity may deliver 4 levels of meaning:

1. attributes
2. benefits
3. values
4. personality

A brand's attributes are a set of labels with which the corporation wishes to be associated. For example, a brand may showcase its primary attribute as environmental friendliness. However, a brand's attributes alone are not enough to persuade a customer into purchasing the product. These attributes must be communicated through benefits, which are more emotional translations. If a brand's attribute is being environmentally friendly, customers will receive the benefit of feeling that they are helping the environment by associating with the brand. Aside from attributes and benefits, a brand's identity may also involve branding to focus on representing its core set of values. If a company is seen to symbolize specific values, it will, in turn, attract customers who also believe in these values. For example, Nike's brand represents the value of a "just do it" attitude. Thus, this form of brand identification attracts customers who also share this same value. Even more extensive than its perceived values is a brand's personality. Quite literally, one can easily describe a successful brand identity as if it were a person. This form of brand identity has proven to be the most advantageous in maintaining long-lasting relationships with consumers, as it gives them a sense of personal interaction with the brand Collectively, all four forms of brand identification help to deliver a powerful meaning behind what a corporation hopes to accomplish, and to explain why customers should choose one brand over its competitors.

=== Brand personality ===
Brand personality refers to "the set of human personality traits that are both applicable to and relevant for brands." Marketers and consumer researchers often argue that brands can be imbued with human-like characteristics which resonate with potential consumers. Such personality traits can assist marketers to create unique, brands that are differentiated from rival brands. Aaker conceptualized brand personality as consisting of five broad dimensions, namely: sincerity (down-to-earth, honest, wholesome, and cheerful), excitement (daring, spirited, imaginative, and up to date), competence (reliable, intelligent, and successful), sophistication (glamorous, upper class, charming), and ruggedness (outdoorsy and tough). Subsequent research studies have suggested that Aaker's dimensions of brand personality are relatively stable across different industries, market segments and over time. Much of the literature on branding suggests that consumers prefer brands with personalities that are congruent with their own.

Consumers may distinguish the psychological aspect (brand associations like thoughts, feelings, perceptions, images, experiences, beliefs, attitudes, and so on that become linked to the brand) of a brand from the experiential aspect. The experiential aspect consists of the sum of all points of contact with the brand and is termed the consumer's brand experience. The brand is often intended to create an emotional response and recognition, leading to potential loyalty and repeat purchases. The brand experience is a brand's action perceived by a person. The psychological aspect, sometimes referred to as the brand image, is a symbolic construct created within the minds of people, consisting of all the information and expectations associated with a product, with a service, or with the companies providing them.

Marketers or product managers responsible for branding seek to develop or align the expectations behind the brand experience. Their goal is to create the impression that a brand associated with a product or service has certain qualities or characteristics which make it special or unique. Therefore, a brand can become one of the most valuable elements in an advertising strategy as it demonstrates what the brand owner is able to offer in the marketplace. This means that building a strong brand helps to distinguish a product from similar ones and sets it apart from competitors. The art of creating and maintaining a brand is called brand management. The orientation of an entire organization towards its brand is called brand orientation. Brand orientation develops in response to market intelligence.

Careful brand management seeks to make products or services relevant and meaningful to a target audience. Marketers tend to treat brands as more than the difference between the actual cost of a product and its selling price; rather brands represent the sum of all valuable qualities of a product to the consumer and are often treated as the total investment in brand building activities including marketing communications.

Consumers may look on branding as an aspect of products or services, as it often serves to denote a certain attractive quality or characteristic (see also brand promise). From the perspective of brand owners, branded products or services can command higher prices. Where two products resemble each other, but one of the products has no associated branding (such as a generic, store-branded product), potential purchasers may often select the more expensive branded product on the basis of the perceived quality of the brand or on the basis of the reputation of the brand owner.

=== Brand Attachment ===
Brand Attachment is the strength of the bond connecting the brand with the self. This concept directly comes from the psychology theory of attachment originally developed by John Bowlby to describe the emotional bond between a person and a target object.

Brand attachment has been divided into two components: brand–self connection, which is the cognitive and emotional link between a brand and a person's identity, and brand prominence, which is the ease and frequency with which thoughts about the brand come to mind. Thomson et al. conceptualized brand attachment as three interrelated emotional dimensions: affection, passion, and connection. they also found brand attachment to be empirically distinct from attitude favorability, satisfaction, and how much the product category mattered to them, while Park et al similarly distinguished it from brand attitude strength.

Another component was added into the attachment models which is called self-brand connection which describes how consumers incorporate a brand into their own self-concept. Escalas and Bettman found that consumers form stronger connections to the brand when a brand is used by a reference group, they belong to or aspire to be in, and this effect is shaped by the motivations of the consumers which is driven by self enhancement and self-verification

The strength and drivers of brand attachment depend on how the brand is positioned. a 2023 consumer study found that brands which are positioned as hedonic differed from functionally positioned brands. In the study, Apple was the only technology brand consumers classified as hedonic and in contrast to its competitors such as Samsung, which was classified as functional.

Empirical studies have linked brand attachment to a range of consumer behaviors, including predicting purchase behavior and the effort consumers make to maintain the relationship. Brand attachment is conceptually distinct from brand loyalty. Attachment has also been linked to separation distress when the brand they were attached to was discontinued. A 2023 literature review grouped these outcomes into three broad categories: brand loyalty and resistance to switching, purchase intentions and willingness to pay, and positive word-of-mouth.

=== Brand awareness ===
Brand awareness involves a customer's ability to recall and/or recognize brands, logos, and branded advertising. Brands help customers understand which brands or products belong to a particular product or service category. Brands also assist customers in understanding the constellation of benefits offered by individual brands and how a given brand within a category is differentiated from its competing brands. Thus, the brand helps customers and potential customers understand which brand satisfies their needs. Therefore, the brand offers customers a shortcut to understanding the different product or service offerings that make up a particular category.

Brand awareness is a key step in the customer's purchase decision process, since some kind of awareness is a precondition to purchasing. That is, customers will not consider a brand if they are not aware of it. Brand awareness is a key component in understanding the effectiveness both of a brand's identity and of its communication methods. Successful brands are those that consistently generate a high level of brand awareness, as this can be the pivotal factor in securing customer transactions. Various forms of brand awareness can be identified. Each form reflects a different stage in a customer's cognitive ability to address the brand in a given circumstance.

Marketers typically identify two distinct types of brand awareness; namely brand recall (also known as unaided recall or occasionally spontaneous recall) and brand recognition (also known as aided brand recall). These types of awareness operate in entirely different ways with important implications for marketing strategy and advertising.

- Most companies aim for "Top-of-Mind" which occurs when a brand pops into a consumer's mind when asked to name brands in a product category. For example, when someone is asked to name a type of facial tissue, the common answer, "Kleenex", will represent a top-of-mind brand. Top-of-mind awareness is a special case of brand recall.
- Brand recall (also known as unaided brand awareness or spontaneous awareness) refers to the brand or set of brands that a consumer can elicit from memory when prompted with a product category
- Brand recognition (also known as aided brand awareness) occurs when consumers see or read a list of brands, and express familiarity with a particular brand only after they hear or see it as a type of memory aide.
- Strategic awareness occurs when a brand is not only top-of-mind to consumers, but also has distinctive qualities which consumers perceive as making it better than other brands in the particular market. The distinction(s) that set a product apart from the competition is/are also known as the unique selling point or USP.

=== Brand recognition ===
Brand recognition is one of the initial phases of brand awareness and validates whether or not a customer remembers being pre-exposed to the brand. Brand recognition (also known as aided brand recall) refers to consumers' ability to correctly differentiate a brand when they come into contact with it. This does not necessarily require consumers to identify or recall the brand name. When customers experience brand recognition, they are triggered by either a visual or verbal cue. For example, when looking to satisfy a category need such as a toilet paper, the customer would firstly be presented with multiple brands to choose from. Once the customer is visually or verbally faced with a brand, they may remember being introduced to it before. When given a cue, consumers able to retrieve the memory node associated with the brand exhibit brand recognition. Often, this form of brand awareness assists customers in choosing one brand over another when faced with a low-involvement purchasing decision.

Brand recognition is often the mode of brand awareness that operates in retail shopping environments. When presented with a product at the point-of-sale, or after viewing its visual packaging, consumers are able to recognize the brand and may be able to associate it with attributes or meanings acquired through exposure to promotion or word-of-mouth referrals. In contrast to brand recall, where few consumers are able to spontaneously recall brand names within a given category, when prompted with a brand name, a larger number of consumers are typically able to recognize it.

Brand recognition is most successful when people can elicit recognition without being explicitly exposed to the company's name, but rather through visual signifiers like logos, slogans, and colors. For example, Disney successfully branded its particular script font (originally created for Walt Disney's "signature" logo), which it used in the logo for go.com.

=== Brand recall ===
Unlike brand recognition, brand recall (also known as unaided brand recall or spontaneous brand recall) is the ability of the customer retrieving the brand correctly from memory. Rather than being given a choice of multiple brands to satisfy a need, consumers are faced with a need first, and then must recall a brand from their memory to satisfy that need. This level of brand awareness is stronger than brand recognition, as the brand must be firmly cemented in the consumer's memory to enable unassisted remembrance. This gives the company huge advantage over its competitors because the customer is already willing to buy or at least know the company offering available in the market. Thus, brand recall is a confirmation that previous branding touchpoints have successfully fermented in the minds of its consumers.

Marketing-mix modeling can help marketing leaders optimize how they spend marketing budgets to maximize the impact on brand awareness or on sales. Managing brands for value creation will often involve applying marketing-mix modeling techniques in conjunction with brand valuation.

== Brand elements ==
Brands typically comprise various elements, such as:

- name: the word or words used to identify a company, product, service, or concept
- logo: the visual trademark that identifies a brand
- tagline or catchphrase: a short phrase always used in the product's advertising and closely associated with the brand
- graphics: the "dynamic ribbon" is a trademarked part of Coca-Cola's brand
- shapes: the distinctive shapes of the Coca-Cola bottle and of the Volkswagen Beetle are trademarked elements of those brands
- colors: the instant recognition consumers have when they see Tiffany & Co.'s robin's egg blue (Pantone No. 1837). Tiffany & Co.'s trademarked the color in 1998.
- sounds: a unique tune or set of notes can denote a brand. NBC's chimes provide a famous example.
- scents: the rose-jasmine-musk scent of Chanel No. 5 is trademarked
- tastes: Kentucky Fried Chicken has trademarked its special recipe of eleven herbs and spices for fried chicken
- movements: Lamborghini has trademarked the upward motion of its car doors
- voice: the expression of a company's personality through its words across channels such as their site copy, advertising, customer emails, newsletters, etc.

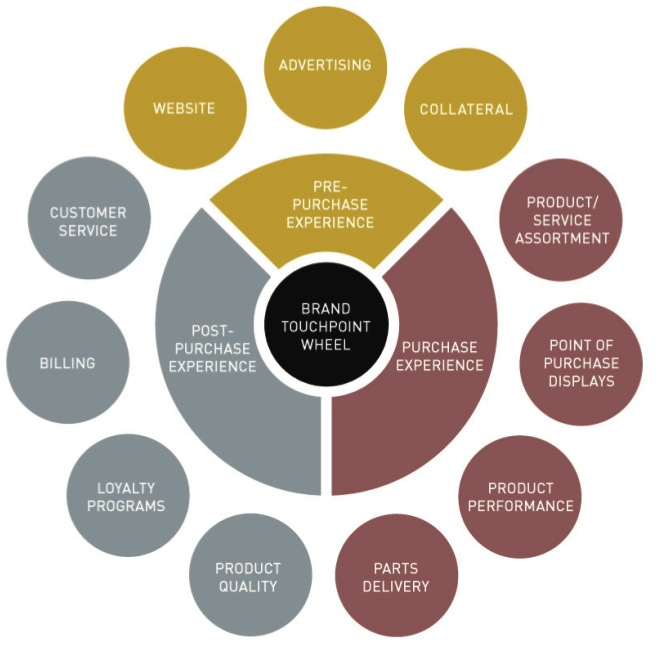
Figure 2. Demonstrating touch points associated with purchase experience stages

=== Brand communication ===
Although brand identity is a fundamental asset to a brand's equity, the worth of a brand's identity would become obsolete without ongoing brand communication. Integrated marketing communications (IMC) relates to how a brand transmits a clear consistent message to its stakeholders. Five key components comprise IMC:

1. Advertising
2. Sales promotions
3. Direct marketing
4. Personal selling
5. Public relations

The effectiveness of a brand's communication is determined by how accurately the customer perceives the brand's intended message through its IMC. Although IMC is a broad strategic concept, the most crucial brand communication elements are pinpointed to how the brand sends a message and what touch points the brand uses to connect with its customers [Chitty 2005].

One can analyze the traditional communication model into several consecutive steps:

- Firstly, a source/sender wishes to convey a message to a receiver. This source must encode the intended message in a way that the receiver will potentially understand.
- After the encoding stage, the forming of the message is complete and is portrayed through a selected channel. In IMC, channels may include media elements such as advertising, public relations, sales promotions, etc.
- It is at this point where the message can often deter from its original purpose as the message must go through the process of being decoded, which can often lead to unintended misinterpretation.
- Finally, the receiver retrieves the message and attempts to understand what the sender was aiming to render. Often, a message may be incorrectly received due to noise in the market, which is caused by "…unplanned static or distortion during the communication process".
- The final stage of this process is when the receiver responds to the message, which is received by the original sender as feedback.

When a brand communicates a brand identity to a receiver, it runs the risk of the receiver incorrectly interpreting the message. Therefore, a brand should use appropriate communication channels to positively "…affect how the psychological and physical aspects of a brand are perceived".

In order for brands to effectively communicate to customers, marketers must "…consider all touch point|s, or sources of contact, that a customer has with the brand". Touch points represent the channel stage in the traditional communication model, where a message travels from the sender to the receiver. Any point where a customer has an interaction with the brand - whether watching a television advertisement, hearing about a brand through word of mouth or even noticing a branded license plate – defines a touchpoint. According to Dahlen et al. (2010), every touchpoint has the "…potential to add positive – or suppress negative – associations to the brand's equity" Thus, a brand's IMC should cohesively deliver positive messages through appropriate touch points associated with its target market. One methodology involves using sensory stimuli touch points to activate customer emotion. For example, if a brand consistently uses a pleasant smell as a primary touchpoint, the brand has a much higher chance of creating a positive lasting effect on its customers' senses as well as memory. Another way a brand can ensure that it is utilizing the best communication channel is by focusing on touchpoints that suit particular areas associated with customer experience. As suggested Figure 2, certain touch points link with a specific stage in customer-brand-involvement. For example, a brand may recognize that advertising touchpoints are most effective during the pre-purchase experience stage therefore they may target their advertisements to new customers rather than to existing customers. Overall, a brand has the ability to strengthen brand equity by using IMC branding communications through touchpoints.

Brand communication is important in ensuring brand success in the business world and refers to how businesses transmit their brand messages, characteristics and attributes to their consumers. One method of brand communication that companies can exploit involves electronic word-of-mouth (eWOM). eWOM is a relatively new approach [Phelps et al., 2004] identified to communicate with consumers. One popular method of eWOM involves social networking sites (SNSs) such as Twitter. A study found that consumers classed their relationship with a brand as closer if that brand was active on a specific social media site (Twitter). Research further found that the more consumers "retweeted" and communicated with a brand, the more they trusted the brand. This suggests that a company could look to employ a social-media campaign to gain consumer trust and loyalty as well as in the pursuit of communicating brand messages.

McKee (2014) also looked into brand communication and states that when communicating a brand, a company should look to simplify its message as this will lead to more value being portrayed as well as an increased chance of target consumers recalling and recognizing the brand.

In 2012 Riefler stated that if the company communicating a brand is a global organization or has future global aims, that company should look to employ a method of communication that is globally appealing to their consumers, and subsequently choose a method of communication with will be internationally understood. One way a company can do this involves choosing a product or service's brand name, as this name will need to be suitable for the marketplace that it aims to enter.

It is important that if a company wishes to develop a global market, the company name will also need to be suitable in different cultures and not cause offense or be misunderstood. When communicating a brand, a company needs to be aware that they must not just visually communicate their brand message and should take advantage of portraying their message through multi-sensory information. One article suggests that other senses, apart from vision, need to be targeted when trying to communicate a brand with consumers. For example, a jingle or background music can have a positive effect on brand recognition, purchasing behaviour and brand recall.

Therefore, when looking to communicate a brand with chosen consumers, companies should investigate a channel of communication that is most suitable for their short-term and long-term aims and should choose a method of communication that is most likely to reach their target consumers. The match-up between the product, the consumer lifestyle, and the endorser is important for the effectiveness of brand communication.

== Global brand variables ==
=== Brand name ===
Relationship between trademarks and brand

The term "brand name" is quite often used interchangeably with "brand", although it is more correctly used to specifically denote written or spoken linguistic elements of any product. In this context, a "brand name" constitutes a type of trademark, if the brand name exclusively identifies the brand owner as the commercial source of products or services. A brand owner may seek to protect proprietary rights in relation to a brand name through trademark registration – such trademarks are called "Registered Trademarks". Advertising spokespersons have also become part of some brands, for example: Mr. Whipple of Charmin toilet tissue and Tony the Tiger of Kellogg's Frosted Flakes. Putting a value on a brand by brand valuation or using marketing mix modeling techniques is distinct to valuing a trademark.

US government purchasing rules allow for federal departments to seek bids using a "brand name or equal" provision in their solicitation. Federal Acquisition Regulation 52.211-6 states that "where an item in [a] solicitation is identified as "brand name or equal", the purchase description [should] reflect the characteristics and level of quality that will satisfy the Government's needs. The salient physical, functional, or performance characteristics that "equal" products must meet are [to be] specified in the solicitation.

==== Types of brand names ====
Brand names come in many styles. These include:

- initialism: a name made of initials, such as "UPS" or "IBM"
- descriptive: names that describe a product benefit or function, such as "Whole Foods" or "Toys R' Us"
- alliteration and rhyme: names that are fun to say and which stick in the mind, such as "Reese's Pieces" or "Dunkin' Donuts"
- evocative: names that can evoke a vivid image, such as "Amazon" or "Crest"
- neologisms: completely made-up words, such as "Wii" or "Häagen-Dazs"
- foreign word: adoption of a word from another language, such as "Volvo"
- founders' names: using the names of real people, (especially a founder's surname), such as "Hewlett-Packard", "Dell", "Disney", "Louis Vuitton" or "Mars"
- geography: naming for regions and landmarks, such as "Cisco" or "Fuji Film"
- personification: taking names from myths, such as "Nike"; or from the minds of ad execs, such as "Betty Crocker"
- punny: some brands create their name by using a silly pun, such as "Lord of the Fries", "Wok on Water" or "Eggs Eggscetera"
- portmanteau: combining multiple words together to create one, such as "Microsoft" ("microcomputer" and "software"), "Comcast" ("communications" and "broadcast"), "Evernote" ("forever" and "note"), "Vodafone" ("voice", "data", "telephone")

The act of associating a product or service with a brand has become part of pop culture. Most products have some kind of brand identity, from common table salt to designer jeans. A brandnomer is a brand name that has colloquially become a generic term for a product or service, such as Band-Aid, Nylon, or Kleenex—which are often used to describe any brand of adhesive bandage; any type of hosiery; or any brand of facial tissue respectively. Xerox, for example, has become synonymous with the word "copy".

=== Brand line ===
A brand line allows the introduction of various subtypes of a product under a common, ideally already established, brand name. Examples would be the individual Kinder chocolates by Ferrero SpA, the subtypes of Coca-Cola, or special editions of popular brands. See also brand extension.

Open Knowledge Foundation created in December 2013 the BSIN (Brand Standard Identification Number). BSIN is universal and is used by the Open Product Data Working Group of the Open Knowledge Foundation to assign a brand to a product. The OKFN Brand repository is critical for the Open Data movement.

=== Brand identity ===
The expression of a brand – including its name, trademark, communications, and visual appearance – is brand identity. Because the identity is assembled by the brand owner, it reflects how the owner wants the consumer to perceive the brand – and by extension the branded company, organization, product or service. This is in contrast to the brand image, which is a customer's mental picture of a brand. The brand owner will seek to bridge the gap between the brand image and the brand identity. Brand identity is fundamental to consumer recognition and symbolizes the brand's differentiation from competitors. Brand identity is distinct from brand image.

Brand identity is what the owner wants to communicate to its potential consumers. However, over time, a product's brand identity may acquire (evolve), gaining new attributes from the consumer's perspective, but not necessarily from the marketing communications an owner conveys to targeted consumers. Therefore, businesses research consumers' brand associations.

The brand identity works as a guideline, as the frame in which a brand will evolve and define itself, or in the words of David Aaker, "…a unique set of brand associations that the brand strategist aspires to create or maintain."

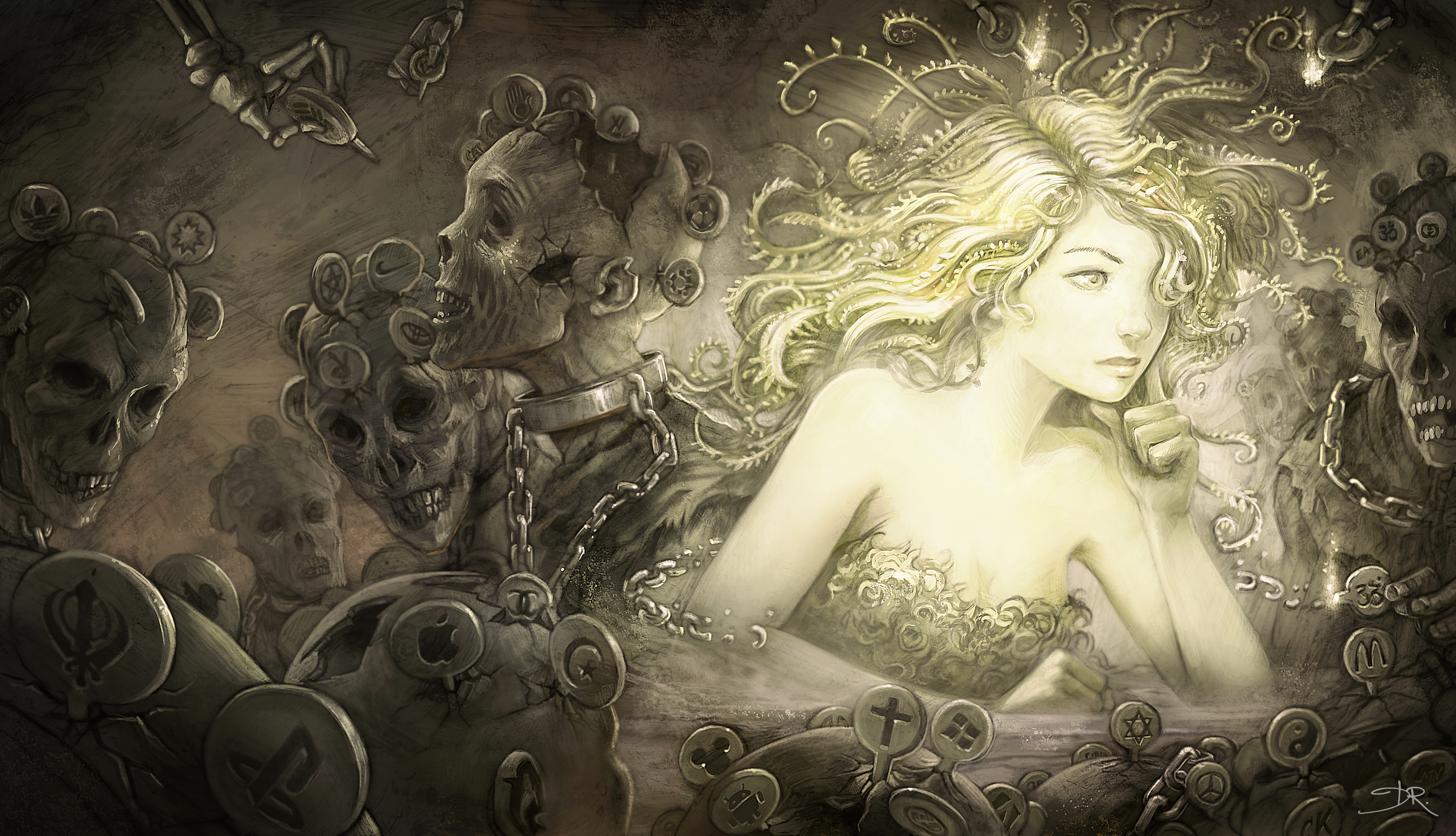
One of the facets to a brand's identity is self-image: How one brand-customer portrays their ideal self – how they want to look and behave; what they aspire to – brands can target their messaging accordingly and make the brand's aspirations reflect theirs.

According to Kapferer (2004), there are six facets to a brand's identity:

- Physique: The physical characteristics and iconography of your brand (such as the Nike swoosh or the orange pantone of easyJet).
- Personality: The persona, how a brand communicates with their audience, which is expressed through its tone of voice, design assets and then integrates this into communication touchpoints in a coherent way.
- Culture: The values, the principles on which a brand bases its behaviour. For example, Google flexible office hours and fun environment so the employees feel happy and creative at work.
- Reflection: The "stereotypical user" of the brand. A brand is likely to be purchased by several buyer's profiles but they will have a go-to person that they use in their campaigns. For example, Lou Yetu and the Parisian chic profile.
- Relationship: The bond between a brand and its customers, and the customer expectations of the brand (the experience beyond the tangible product). Such as warranties or services during and after purchase help maintain a sustainable relationship and keep the consumer trust.
- Self-image: How one brand-customer portrays their ideal self – how they want to look and behave; what they aspire to – brands can target their messaging accordingly and make the brand's aspirations reflect theirs.

=== Brand image ===
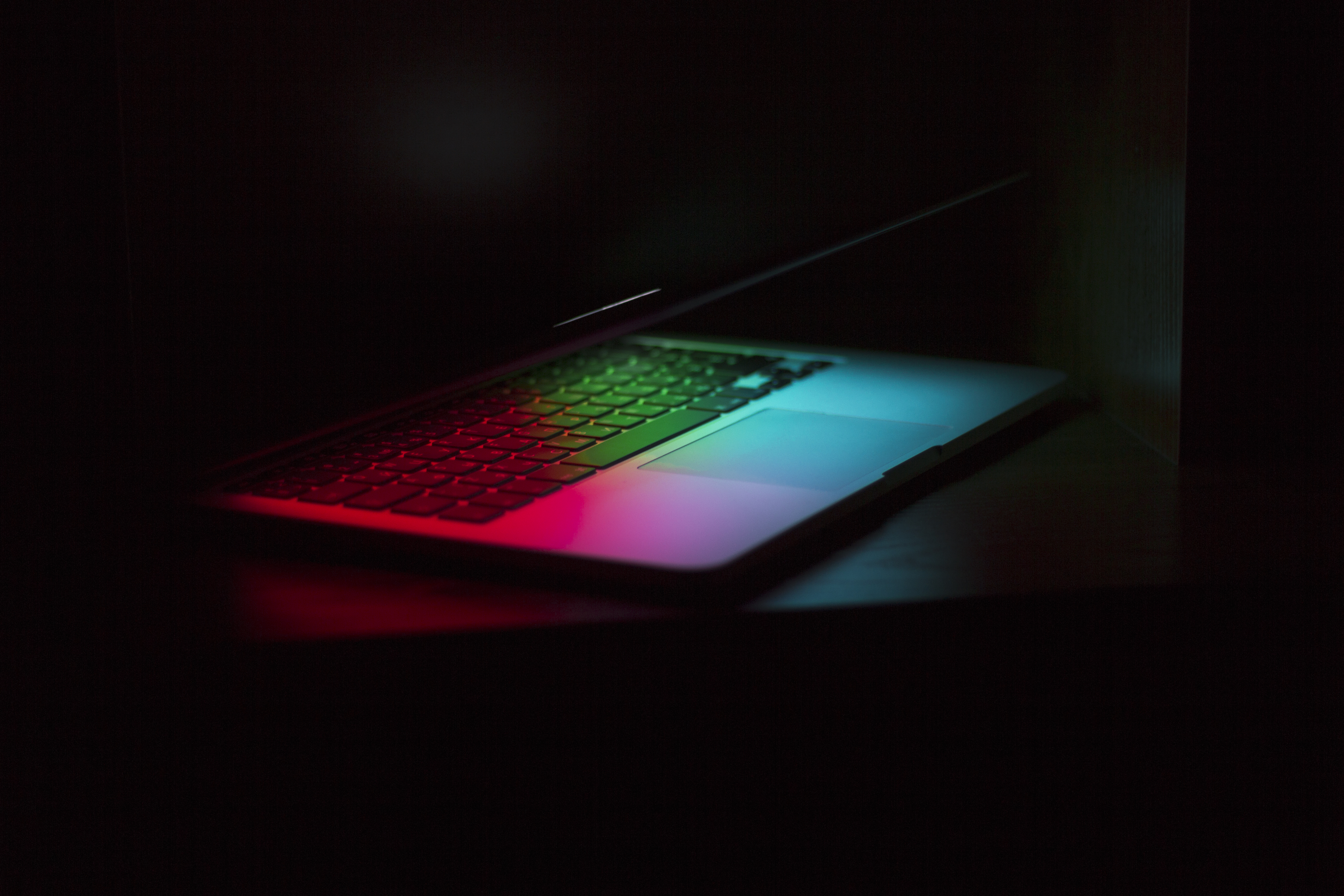
Apple: Known for innovation, sleek design, and premium quality, Apple's brand image appeals to consumers seeking cutting-edge technology.

Brand image refers to the perception consumers have about a brand, shaped by their interactions, experiences, and beliefs regarding the brand's products or services. It's the impression that resides in the minds of consumers, influencing their purchasing decisions and loyalty.

==== Brand trust ====
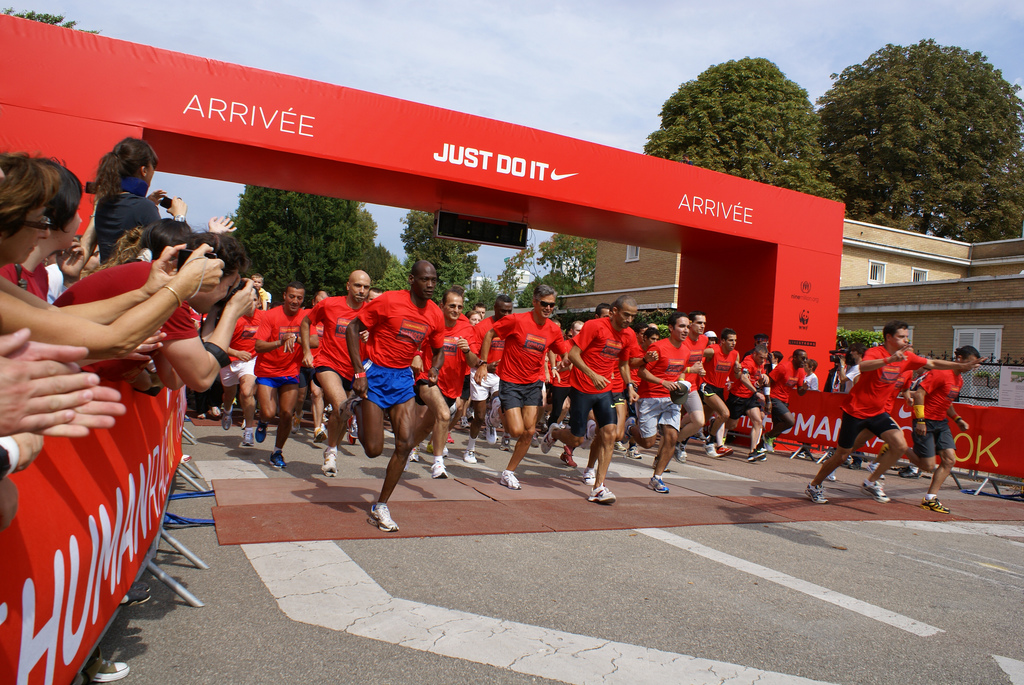
Nike: Associated with athleticism, performance, and motivation, Nike's brand image resonates with both professional athletes and fitness enthusiasts.

Brand trust is the faith of consumers in the brand. A brand trust impacts the behavior and performance of its business stakeholders in many ways. It creates the foundation of a strong connection with stakeholders, converting awareness into commitment.

A positive brand image fosters trust among consumers, leading to increased loyalty and repeat purchases. When consumers perceive a brand positively, they are more likely to choose it over its competitors.

==== Market Differentiation ====
Some say that a distinctive brand image helps a company stand out in a competitive market, making its products or services more recognizable and appealing.

==== Visual brand identity ====
The visual brand identity manual for Mobil Oil (developed by Chermayeff & Geismar & Haviv), one of the first visual identities to integrate logotype, icon, alphabet, color palette, and station architecture

Color is a particularly important element of visual brand identity and color mapping provides an effective way of ensuring color contributes to differentiation in a visually cluttered marketplace.

=== Brand parity ===
Brand parity is the perception of customers that some brands are equivalent. This means that shoppers will purchase within a group of accepted brands rather than choosing one specific brand. Cranfield management professor Christopher Martin has referred to research confirming that consumers choose from a "portfolio of brands", and that factors such as availability will be a major determinant of actual choice.

When brand parity operates, quality is often not a major concern because consumers believe that only minor quality differences exist. Instead, it is important to have brand equity which is "the perception that a good or service with a given brand name is different, better, and can be trusted" according to Kenneth E Clow.

== Expanding role of brands ==
The original aim of branding was to simplify the process of identifying and differentiating products. Over time, manufacturers began to use branded messages to give the brand a unique personality. Brands came to embrace a performance or benefit promise, for the product, certainly, but eventually also for the company behind the brand.

Today, brands play a much bigger role. The power of brands to communicate a complex message quickly, with emotional impact and with the ability of brands to attract media attention, makes them ideal tools in the hands of activists. Cultural conflict over a brand's meaning has also influences the diffusion of an innovation.

During the COVID-19 pandemic, 75% of US customers tried different stores, websites or brands, and 60% of those expect to integrate new brands or stores into their post-pandemic lives. If brands can find ways to help people feel empowered and regain a sense of control in uncertain times, they can help people reconnect and heal (and be appreciated for it).

== Branding strategies ==
Same brand, different company (Yamaha and Yamaha Motor)

=== Company name ===
Often, especially in the industrial sector, brand engineers will promote a company's name. Exactly how the company name relates to product and services names forms part of a brand architecture. Decisions about company names and product names and their relationship depend on more than a dozen strategic considerations.

In this case, a strong brand name (or company name) becomes the vehicle for marketing a range of products (for example, Mercedes-Benz or Black & Decker) or a range of subsidiary brands (such as Cadbury Dairy Milk, Cadbury Flake, or Cadbury Fingers in the UK).

Corporate name-changes offer particularly stark examples of branding-related decisions. A name change may signal different ownership or new product directions. Thus the name Unisys originated in 1986 when Burroughs bought and incorporated UNIVAC; and the newly named International Business Machines represented a broadening of scope in 1924 from its original name, the Computing-Tabulating-Recording Company. A change in corporate naming may also have a role in seeking to shed an undesirable image: for example, Werner Erhard and Associates re-branded its activities as Landmark Education in 1991 at a time when publicity in a 60 Minutes investigative-report broadcast cast the est and Werner Erhard brands in a negative light, and Union Carbide India Limited became Eveready Industries India in 1994 subsequent to the Bhopal disaster of 1984

=== Individual branding ===
Marketers associate separate products or lines with separate brand names - such as Seven-Up, Kool-Aid, or Nivea Sun (Beiersdorf - which may compete against other brands from the same company (for example, Unilever owns Persil, Omo, Surf, and Lynx).

=== Challenger brands ===
A challenger brand is a brand in an industry where it is neither the market leader nor a niche brand. Challenger brands are categorized by a mindset that sees them have business ambitions beyond conventional resources and an intent to bring change to an industry. Challengers change the marketing or perception of the product or service being sold. Challenger brands target the market leader.

=== Disruptor brands ===
Like the challenger brand, a disruptor brand is a brand in an industry where it is neither the market leader nor a niche brand. Disruptor brands try to create a new market or utilize technology and innovation to transform the existing market. Disruptors change the actual product or service being sold. Disruptor brands ignore the market leader.

=== Multiproduct branding strategy ===
Multiproduct branding strategy is when a company uses one name across all its products in a product class. When the company's trade name is used, multiproduct branding is also known as corporate branding, family branding or umbrella branding. Examples of companies that use corporate branding are Microsoft, Samsung, Apple, and Sony as the company's brand name is identical to their trade name. Other examples of multiproduct branding strategy include Virgin and Church & Dwight. Virgin, a multination conglomerate uses the punk-inspired, handwritten red logo with the iconic tick for all its products ranging from airlines, hot air balloons, telecommunication to healthcare. Church & Dwight, a manufacturer of household products displays the Arm & Hammer family brand name for all its products containing baking soda as the main ingredient. A multiproduct branding strategy has many advantages. It capitalizes on brand equity as consumers that have a good experience with the product will in turn pass on this positive opinion to supplementary objects in the same product class as they share the same name. Consequently, the multiproduct branding strategy makes product line extension possible.

==== Product line extension ====
A product line extension is the procedure of entering a new market segment in its product class by means of using a current brand name. An example of this is the Campbell's, primarily a producer of canned soups. They utilize a multiproduct branding strategy by way of soup line extensions. They have over 100 soup flavours putting forward varieties such as regular Campbell soup, condensed, chunky, fresh-brewed, organic, and soup on the go. This approach is seen as favourable as it can result in lower promotion costs and advertising due to the same name being used on all products, therefore increasing the level of brand awareness. Although, line extension has potential negative outcomes with one being that other items in the company's line may be disadvantaged because of the sale of the extension. Line extensions work at their best when they deliver an increase in company revenue by enticing new buyers or by removing sales from competitors.

==== Subbranding ====
Subbranding is used by certain multiproduct branding companies. Subbranding merges a corporate, family or umbrella brand with the introduction of a new brand in order to differentiate part of a product line from others in the whole brand system. Subbranding assists to articulate and construct offerings. It can alter a brand's identity as subbranding can modify associations of the parent brand. Examples of successful subbranding can be seen through Gatorade and Porsche. Gatorade, a manufacturer of sport-themed food and beverages effectively introduced Gatorade G2, a low-calorie line of Gatorade drinks. Likewise, Porsche, a specialized automobile manufacturer successfully markets its lower-end line, Porsche Boxster and higher-end line, Porsche Carrera.

==== Brand extension and brand dilution ====
Brand extension is the system of employing a current brand name to enter a different product class. Having a strong brand equity allows for brand extension; for example, many fashion and designer companies extended brands into fragrances, shoes and accessories, home textile, home decor, luggage, (sun-) glasses, furniture, hotels, etc. Nevertheless, brand extension has its disadvantages. There is a risk that too many uses for one brand name can oversaturate the market resulting in a blurred and weak brand for consumers. Examples of brand extension can be seen through Kimberly-Clark and Honda. Kimberly-Clark is a corporation that produces personal and health care products being able to extend the Huggies brand name across a full line of toiletries for toddlers and babies. The success of this brand extension strategy is apparent in the $500 million in annual sales generated globally. Similarly, Honda using their reputable name for automobiles has spread to other products such as motorcycles, power equipment, engines, robots, aircraft, and bikes. Mars extended its brand to ice cream, Caterpillar to shoes and watches, Michelin to a restaurant guide, Adidas and Puma to personal hygiene. Dunlop extended its brand from tires to other rubber products such as shoes, golf balls, tennis racquets, and adhesives. Frequently, the product is no different from what else is on the market, except a brand name marking. Brand is product identity.

There is a difference between brand extension and line extension. A line extension is when a current brand name is used to enter a new market segment in the existing product class, with new varieties or flavors or sizes. When Coca-Cola launched Diet Coke and Cherry Coke, they stayed within the originating product category: non-alcoholic carbonated beverages. Procter & Gamble did likewise extending its strong lines (such as Fairy Soap) into neighboring products (Fairy Liquid and Fairy Automatic) within the same category, dish washing detergents.

The risk of over-extension is brand dilution where the brand loses its brand associations with a market segment, product area, or quality, price or cachet.

=== Brand collaborations ===
Brand collaborations refer to the participation of multiple firms in a branding initiative. Brand collaborations are short-lived or ephemeral "partnerships between brands in which their images, legacies and values intertwine."^{p. 13} One of the most well-known is co-branding, a strategy in which two firms combine their brands into a single product.

Most recently, some brands have engaged in unconventional brand collaborations, partnering with other brands or designers with a significantly different design, esthetic, positioning or set of values. For example, in 2017, Louis Vuitton partnered with the skateboarding brand Supreme.

=== Multibranding strategy ===
Multibranding strategy is when a company gives each product a distinct name. Multibranding is best used as an approach when each brand in intended for a different market segment. Multibranding is used in an assortment of ways with selected companies grouping their brands based on price-quality segments. Individual brand names naturally allow greater flexibility by permitting a variety of different products, of differing quality, to be sold without confusing the consumer's perception of what business the company is in or diluting higher quality products. Procter & Gamble, a multinational consumer goods company that offers over 100 brands, each suited for different consumer needs. For instance, Head & Shoulders that helps consumers relieve dandruff in the form of a shampoo, Oral-B which offers inter-dental products, Vicks which offers cough and cold products, and Downy which offers dryer sheets and fabric softeners. Other examples include Coca-Cola, Nestlé, Kellogg's, and Mars.

This approach usually results in higher promotion costs and advertising. This is due to the company being required to generate awareness among consumers and retailers for each new brand name without the benefit of any previous impressions. Multibranding strategy has many advantages. There is no risk that a product failure will affect other products in the line as each brand is unique to each market segment. Although, certain large multiband companies have come across that the cost and difficulty of implementing a multibranding strategy can overshadow the benefits. For example, Unilever, the world's third-largest multination consumer goods company recently streamlined its brands from over 400 brands to center their attention onto 14 brands with sales of over 1 billion euros. Unilever accomplished this through product deletion and sales to other companies. Other multibrand companies introduce new product brands as a protective measure to respond to competition called fighting brands or fighter brands.

Cannibalization is a particular challenge with a multi-brand strategy approach, in which the new brand takes business away from an established one which the organization also owns. This may be acceptable (indeed to be expected) if there is a net gain overall. Alternatively, it may be the price the organization is willing to pay for shifting its position in the market; the new product being one stage in this process.

==== Fighting brands ====
The main purpose of fighting brands is to challenge competitor brands. For example, Qantas, Australia's largest flag carrier airline, introduced Jetstar to go head-to-head against the low-cost carrier, Virgin Australia (formerly known as Virgin Blue). Jetstar is an Australian low-cost airline for budget conscious travellers, but it receives many negative reviews due to this. The launching of Jetstar allowed Qantas to rival Virgin Australia without the criticism being affiliated with Qantas because of the distinct brand name.

=== Private branding strategy ===
Private branding (also known as reseller branding, private labelling, store brands, or own brands) have increased in popularity. Private branding is when a company manufactures products but it is sold under the brand name of a wholesaler or retailer. Private branding is popular because it typically produces high profits for manufacturers and resellers. The pricing of private brand product are usually cheaper compared to competing name brands. Consumers are commonly deterred by these prices in good economic circumstances, as it sets a perception of lower quality and standard, but this view shifts in less ideal economic circumstances.

In Australia, their leading supermarket chains, both Woolworths and Coles are saturated with store brands (or private labels). For example, in the United States, Paragon Trade Brands, Ralcorp Holdings, and Rayovac are major suppliers of diapers, grocery products, and private label alkaline batteries, correspondingly. Costco, Walmart, RadioShack, Sears and Kroger are large retailers that have their own brand names. Similarly, Macy's, a mid-range chain of department stores offers a wide catalogue of private brands exclusive to their stores, from brands such as First Impressions which supply newborn and infant clothing, Hotel Collection which supply luxury linens and mattresses, and Tasso Elba which supply European inspired menswear. They use private branding strategy to specifically target consumer markets.

=== Mixed branding strategy ===
Mixed branding strategy is where a firm markets products under its own name(s) and that of a reseller because the segment attracted to the reseller is different from its own market. For example, Elizabeth Arden, Inc., a major American cosmetics and fragrance company, uses mixed branding strategy. The company sells its Elizabeth Arden brand through department stores and line of skin care products at Walmart with the "skin simple" brand name. Companies such as Whirlpool, Del Monte, and Dial produce private brands of home appliances, pet foods, and soap, correspondingly. Other examples of mixed branding strategy include Michelin, Epson, Microsoft, Gillette, and Toyota. Michelin, one of the largest tire manufacturers allowed Sears, an American retail chain to place their brand name on the tires. Microsoft, a multinational technology company is seriously regarded as a corporate technology brand but it sells its versatile home entertainment hub under the brand Xbox to better align with the new and crazy identity. Gillette catered to females with Gillette for Women which has now become known as Venus. The launch of Venus was conducted in order to fulfil the feminine market of the previously dominating masculine razor industry. Similarly, Toyota, an automobile manufacturer used mixed branding. In the U.S., Toyota was regarded as a valuable car brand being economical, family orientated and known as a vehicle that rarely broke down. But Toyota sought out to fulfil a higher end, expensive market segment, thus they created Lexus, the luxury vehicle division of premium cars.

=== Attitude branding and iconic brands ===
Attitude branding is the choice to represent a larger feeling, which is not necessarily connected with the product or consumption of the product at all. Marketing labeled as attitude branding include that of Nike, Starbucks, The Body Shop, Safeway and Apple. In the 1999 book No Logo, Naomi Klein describes attitude branding as a "fetish strategy". Schaefer and Kuehlwein analyzed brands such as Apple, Ben & Jerry's or Chanel describing them as 'Ueber-Brands' – brands that are able to gain and retain "meaning beyond the material."

A great brand raises the bar – it adds a greater sense of purpose to the experience, whether it's the challenge to do your best in sports and fitness, or the affirmation that the cup of coffee you're drinking really matters. – Howard Schultz (President, CEO, and Chairman of Starbucks)

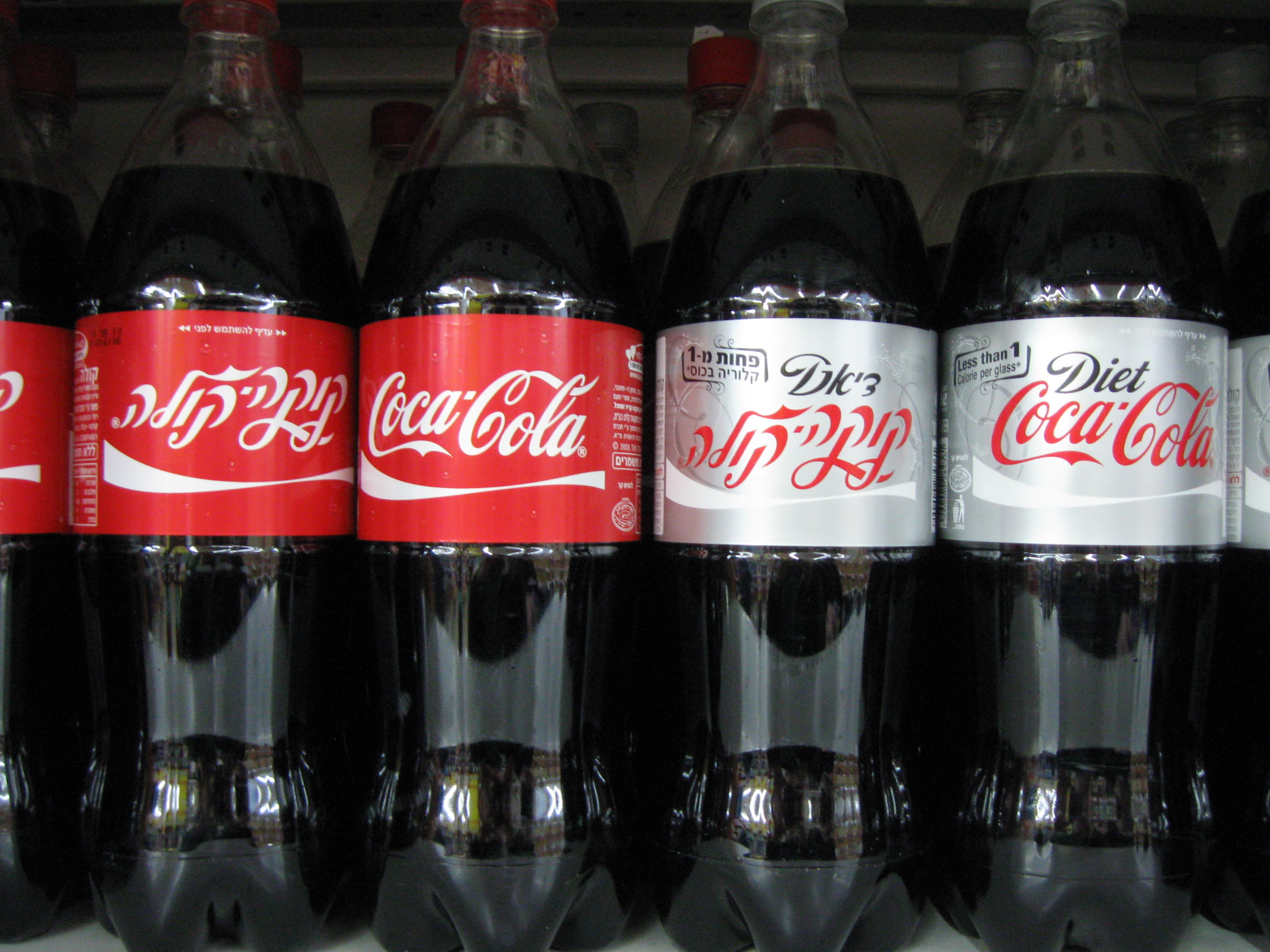
The color, letter font and style of the Coca-Cola and Diet Coca-Cola logos in English were copied into matching Hebrew logos to maintain brand identity in Israel.

Iconic brands are defined as having aspects that contribute to consumer's self-expression and personal identity. Brands whose value to consumers comes primarily from having identity value are said to be "identity brands". Some of these brands have such a strong identity that they become more or less cultural icons which makes them "iconic brands". Examples are: Apple, Nike and Harley-Davidson. Many iconic brands include almost ritual-like behaviour in purchasing or consuming the products.

There are four key elements to creating iconic brands (Holt 2004):

1. "Necessary conditions" – The performance of the product must at least be acceptable, preferably with a reputation of having good quality.
2. "Myth-making" – A meaningful storytelling fabricated by cultural insiders. These must be seen as legitimate and respected by consumers for stories to be accepted.
3. "Cultural contradictions" – Some kind of mismatch between prevailing ideology and emergent undercurrents in society. In other words, a difference with the way consumers are and how they wish they were.
4. "The cultural brand management process" – Actively engaging in the myth-making process in making sure the brand maintains its position as an icon.

Schaefer and Kuehlwein propose the following 'Ueber-Branding' principles. They derived them from studying successful modern Prestige brands and what elevates them above mass competitors and beyond considerations of performance and price (alone) in the minds of consumers:

1. "Mission Incomparable" – Having a differentiated and meaningful brand purpose beyond 'making money.' Setting rules that follow this purpose – even when it violates the mass marketing mantra of "Consumer is always Boss/right".
2. "Longing versus Belonging" – Playing with the opposing desires of people for Inclusion on the one hand and Exclusivity on the other.
3. "Un-Selling" – First and foremost seeking to seduce through pride and provocation, rather than to sell through arguments.
4. "From Myth To Meaning" – Leveraging the power of myth – 'Ueber-Stories' that have fascinated- and guided humans forever.
5. "Behold!" – Making products and associated brand rituals reflect the essence of the brand mission and myth. Making it the center of attention, while keeping it fresh.
6. "Living the Dream" – Living the brand mission as an organization and through its actions. Thus radiating the brand myth from the inside out, consistently and through all brand manifestations. – For "Nothing is as volatile than a dream."
7. "Growth without End" – Avoiding to be perceived as an omnipresent, diluting brand appeal. Instead 'growing with gravitas' by leveraging scarcity/high prices, 'sideways expansion' and other means.

=== "No-brand" branding ===
Recently, a number of companies have successfully pursued "no-brand" strategies by creating packaging that imitates generic brand simplicity. Examples include the Japanese company Muji, which means "No label" in English (from 無印良品 – "Mujirushi Ryohin" – literally, "No brand quality goods"), and the Florida company No-Ad Sunscreen. Although there is a distinct Muji brand, Muji products are not branded. This no-brand strategy means that little is spent on advertisement or classical marketing and Muji's success is attributed to the word-of-mouth, simple shopping experience and the anti-brand movement. "No brand" branding may be construed as a type of branding as the product is made conspicuous through the absence of a brand name. "Tapa Amarilla" or "Yellow Cap" in Venezuela during the 1980s is another good example of no-brand strategy. It was simply recognized by the color of the cap of this cleaning products company.

=== Derived brands ===
In this case the supplier of a key component, used by a number of suppliers of the end-product, may wish to guarantee its own position by promoting that component as a brand in its own right. The most frequently quoted example is Intel, which positions itself in the PC market with the slogan (and sticker) "Intel Inside".

=== Social media brands ===
In The Better Mousetrap: Brand Invention in a Media Democracy (2012), author and brand strategist Simon Pont posits that social media brands may be the most evolved version of the brand form, because they focus not on themselves but on their users. In so doing, social media brands are arguably more charismatic, in that consumers are compelled to spend time with them, because the time spent is in the meeting of fundamental human drivers related to belonging and individualism. "We wear our physical brands like badges, to help define us – but we use our digital brands to help express who we are. They allow us to be, to hold a mirror up to ourselves, and it is clear. We like what we see."

=== Private labels ===
Private label brands, also called own brands, or store brands have become popular. Where the retailer has a particularly strong identity (such as Marks & Spencer in the United Kingdom clothing sector) this "own brand" may be able to compete against even the strongest brand leaders, and may outperform those products that are not otherwise strongly branded.

Designer Private Labels

A relatively recent innovation in retailing is the introduction of designer private labels. Designer-private labels involve a collaborative contract between a well-known fashion designer and a retailer. Both retailer and designer collaborate to design goods with popular appeal pitched at price points that fit the consumer's budget. For retail outlets, these types of collaborations give them greater control over the design process as well as access to exclusive store brands that can potentially drive store traffic.

In Australia, for example, the department store, Myer, now offers a range of exclusive designer private labels including Jayson Brundson, Karen Walker, Leona Edmiston, Wayne Cooper, Fleur Wood and 'L' for Lisa Ho. Another up-market department store, David Jones, currently offers 'Collette' for leading Australian designer, Collette Dinnigan, and has recently announced its intention to extend the number of exclusive designer brands. Target Australia has teamed up with Dannii Minogue to produce her "Petites" range. Specsavers has joined up with Sydney designer, Alex Perry to create an exclusive range of spectacle frames while Big W stocks frame designed by Peter Morrissey.

=== Individual and organizational brands ===
With the development of the brand, Branding is no longer limited to a product or service. There are kinds of branding that treat individuals and organizations as the products to be branded. Most NGOs and non-profit organizations carry their brand as a fundraising tool. The purpose of most NGOs is to leave a social impact so their brand becomes associated with specific social life matters. Amnesty International, Habitat for Humanity, World Wildlife Fund and AIESEC are among the most recognized brands around the world. NGOs and non-profit organizations moved beyond using their brands for fundraising to express their internal identity and to clarify their social goals and long-term aims. Organizational brands have well-determined brand guidelines and logo variables.

=== Crowd sourced branding ===
These are brands that are created by "the public" for the business, which is opposite to the traditional method where the business creates a brand.

=== Personalized branding ===
Many businesses have started to use elements of personalization in their branding strategies, offering the client or consumer the ability to choose from various brand options or have direct control over the brand. Examples of this include the #ShareACoke campaign by Coca-Cola which printed people's names and place names on their bottles encouraging people. AirBNB has created the facility for users to create their own symbol for the software to replace the brand's mark known as The Bélo.

=== Nation branding (place branding and public diplomacy) ===
Nation branding is a field of theory and practice which aims to measure, build and manage the reputation of countries (closely related to place branding). Some approaches applied, such as an increasing importance on the symbolic value of products, have led countries to emphasize their distinctive characteristics. The branding and image of a nation-state "and the successful transference of this image to its exports – is just as important as what they actually produce and sell."

=== Destination branding ===
Destination branding is the work of cities, states, and other localities to promote the location to tourists and drive additional revenues into a tax base. These activities are often undertaken by governments, but can also result from the work of community associations. The Destination Marketing Association International is the industry leading organization.

=== Brand protection ===
Intellectual property infringements, in particular counterfeiting, can affect consumer trust and ultimately damage brand equity. Brand protection is the set of preventive, monitoring and reactive measures taken by brand owners to eliminate, reduce or mitigate these infringements and their effect.

== Doppelgänger brand image (DBI) ==
A doppelgänger brand image or "DBI" is a disparaging image or story about a brand that is circulated in popular culture. DBI targets tend to be widely known and recognizable brands. The purpose of DBIs is to undermine the positive brand meanings the brand owners are trying to instill through their marketing activities.

Examples include:

- Joe Chemo campaign organized to criticize the marketing of tobacco products to children and their harmful effects.
- Parody of the Pepsi logo as an obese man to highlight the relationship between soft drink consumption and obesity.
- The FUH2 campaign protesting the Hummer SUV as a symbol of corporate and public irresponsibility toward public safety and the environment.

In the 2006 article "Emotional Branding and the Strategic Value of the Doppelgänger Brand Image", Thompson, Rindfleisch, and Arsel suggest that a doppelgänger brand image can be a benefit to a brand if taken as an early warning sign that the brand is losing emotional authenticity with its market.

== International Standards ==
The ISO branding standards developed by the Committee ISO/TC 289 are:

- 'ISO 10668:2010' Brand valuation - Requirements for monetary brand valuation ,
- 'ISO 20671:2021' Brand evaluation - Principles and fundamentals .

Two other ISO standards are being developed by ISO/TC 289:

- ISO/AWI 23353 Brand evaluation - Guidelines for brands relating to geographical indications
- ISO/AWI 24051 Brand evaluation - Guide for the annual brand evaluation.

== See also ==
- Brand ambassador
- Brand architecture
- Brand engagement
- Brand extension - a marketing technique
- Brand licensing - owner of the brand allowing someone else to use it
- Brand loyalty
- Brand management
- Brand protection
- Brand valuation
- Green brands - a classification of brands
- Imprint (trade name) - similar concept in the publishing industry
- Legal name
- Global Brand Database
- Lifestyle brand - a classification of brands
- List of defunct consumer brands
- List of most valuable brands
- No Logo - a book
- Open-source brand
- Promotion
- Rebadging - automotive market segmentation technique
- Rebranding - a marketing technique
- Record label - similar concept in the music recording industry
- Return on brand (ROB)
- Terroir - concept of using placenames as brands
- Trade name
- Product differentiation
- Umbrella brand - a marketing technique
- Visual brand language - technical term in brand designing
