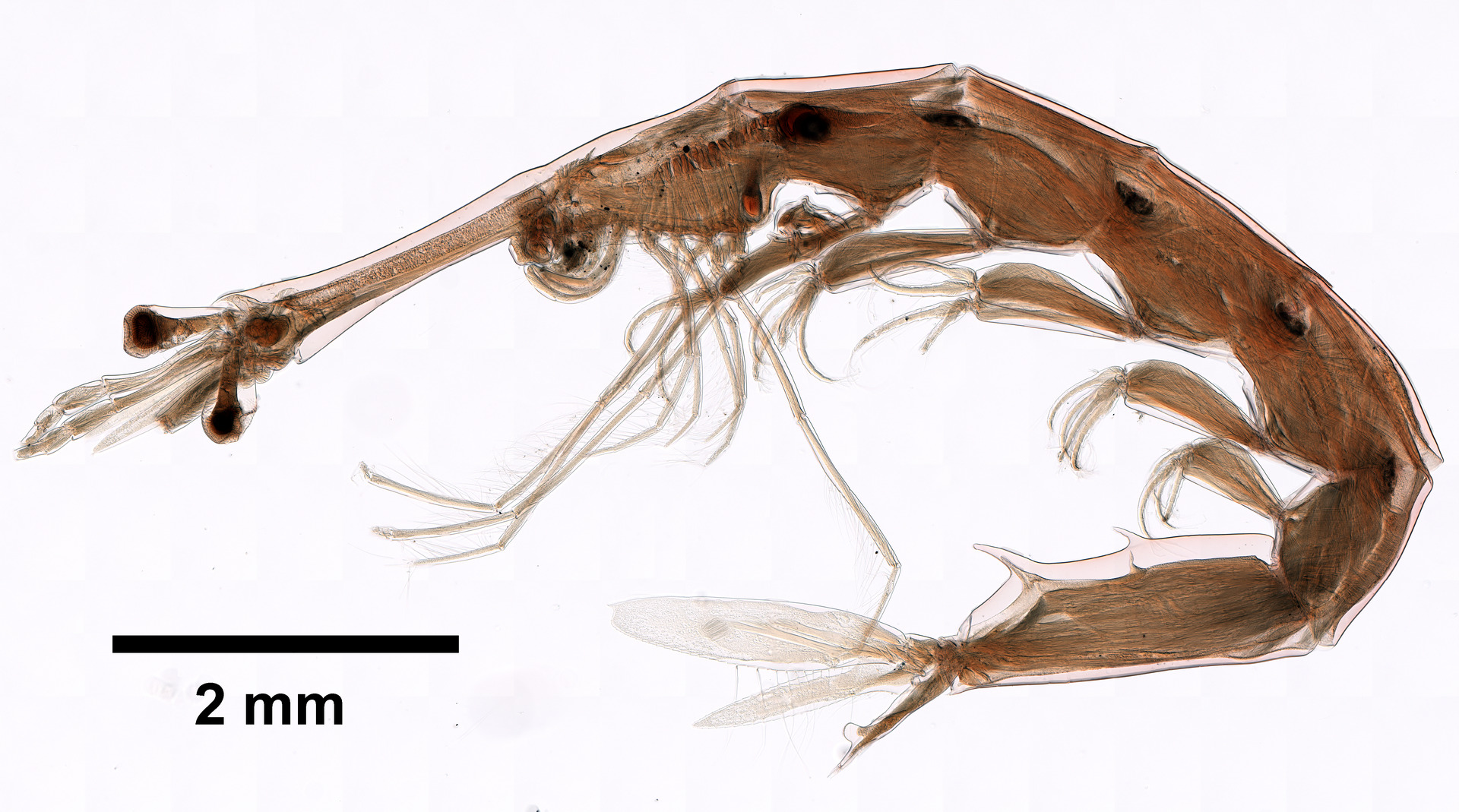
- Preserved B. faxoni specimen under a microscope

Scientific classification
- Kingdom: Animalia
- Phylum: Arthropoda
- Clade: Pancrustacea
- Class: Malacostraca
- Order: Decapoda
- Suborder: Dendrobranchiata
- Family: Luciferidae
- Genus: Belzebub
- Species: B. faxoni

Binomial name
- Belzebub faxoni (Borradaile, 1915)

= Belzebub faxoni =

Species of crustacean

Belzebub faxoni, formerly known as Lucifer faxoni and now widely known as "Lucifer shrimp" or "Faxon's lucifer prawn", is a species of short-lived, predatory, planktonic shrimp commonly found in the neretic waters of the coastal Atlantic Ocean.

== Taxonomy ==
Originally described in 1915 by English zoologist Lancelot Alexander Borradaile, Belzebub faxoni were originally classified under the genus Lucifer, being given the name Lucifer faxoni. Following a phylogenic analysis of the family Luciferidae, morphological differences were revealed within the family that resulted in the creation of the genus Belzebub. Along with B. faxoni four other species were moved into the new genus:

- Belzebub chacei (Bowman, 1967)
- Belzebub hanseni (Nobili, 1906)
- Belzebub intermedius (Hansen, 1919)
- Belzebub penicillifer (Hansen, 1919)

The associated names of B. faxoni:

- Lucifer affinis (Borradaile, 1915)
- Lucifer faxoni (Borradaile, 1915)
- Lucifer typus (Faxon, 1878)
- Lucifer faxonii (Hansen, 1919)

== Morphology ==
The morphological features distinct to Belzebub faxoni are minute, pertaining to the length and shape of the uropod expodite and the structure of the male clasping organ. Some notable features of B. faxoni, however, are the extreme length of their carapace and a thin, laterally flattened body. The rostrum is short and lacks teeth, though there are protrusions off the side of the carapace near the mouthparts. The mandibles are greatly reduced down into razor-like feeding appendages, and the eye stalks are stout. Another key feature is that their fourth and fifth pairs of pereiopods are reduced.

Belzebub faxoni experiences significant sexual dimorphism with females being notably larger than males. Males also possess two large, ventral teeth on the last abdominal segment, while these are reduced in females. As such, the identification of males to species is far more certain.

== Behavior ==
=== Reproduction and development ===
Belzebub faxoni experience short lifespans of around a month, reaching sexual maturity within 20 - 30 days. They are gonochoristic with males producing a spermatophore to deposit within the female during copulation. Males possess a clasping organ known as the pentasma used to hold onto females though details of the copulation process between the sexes is currently unknown. It is noted that reproduction occurs in nearshore waters. Molting and oviposition is most frequently recorded to occur at night, leading many researchers to believe that the females experience synchronized spawning activity releasing their eggs in the few hours before midnight.

Unlike many other shrimp species, B. faxoni practice a relatively high degree of parental care. Females attach their eggs in the space between the third pair of pereiopods, or walking legs, using the sticky substance of the egg membrane. These eggs stay attached in this space until they hatch, which usually occurs within 1 - 2 days. These broods are small, but frequent with one study finding the average brood size to be 27.5 young with the largest sizes appearing with the reproduction peak in the fall.

Belzebub faxoni larvae metamorphose and their development can be divided into four to five relatively distinct stages depending on sex: (1) Nauplius larvae, (2) Protozoea, (3) Schizopod, (4) Immature male / adult female, and (4) Adult male. The distinction between these stages are characterized by many different changes in body structures and varying presence of appendages. Some notable distinctions are the development of the carapace, reduction of the mandibles, the extension and flattening of the body, and the development of the clasping segment of the adult male. The names of these stages may vary across literature.

=== Feeding ===
Though little research has been conducted on the feeding behaviors of Belzebub faxoni specimens in the field, lab experimentation indicates that they are voracious predators--consuming other zooplankton, phytoplankton, and their own eggs. Adults are largely carnivorous, feeding on prey smaller or close to their own size such as juvenile or holoplanktonic arthropods and naked molluscs. Juveniles and larvae, on the other hand, have been observed to favor phytoplankton. Though it has not been recorded, researchers believe the razor-like form of their feeding appendage alludes to the possibility of omnivory. How fast these individuals eat was found to depend on the amount and size of prey available. In high prey availability, B. faxoni will feed continuously.

== Distribution ==
The range of Belzebub faxoni is limited exclusively to the Atlantic Ocean with individuals favoring warmer, neritic waters. Despite this preference, individuals have been observed as far northward as Canada and are often found as far south as Brazil. Most studies conducted on the species evaluate those in the Gulf of Mexico and off the coast of Brazil. There have also been observations of groups off the coast of West Africa, though these populations are not thoroughly studied.

Populations of adult B. faxoni are concentrated in nearshore waters, even expanding inland in certain locations. This has been attributed to high concentrations of zooplankton and phytoplankton biomass as well as higher salinities which abundance has been recorded to favor. Larval forms, on the other hand, are often found further offshore. It is theorized that this occurrence, as well as adult specimens in the open ocean, is due to their susceptibility to be moved outward by strong ocean currents such as the Gulf Stream. Larval and juvenile individuals tend to concentrate near the surface with phytoplankton abundance.

=== Movement ===
Belzebub faxoni are holoplanktonic, spending their entire life cycle in the planktonic stage. As such, much of their movement is determined by tidal influences with certain adaptations like setae making them resistant to sinking through the water column. Many studies have demonstrated the occurrence of diel vertical migration in relation to both solar and tidal cycles. Like many other planktonic organisms, individuals feed near the surface at night and sink to deeper water during the day likely to avoid predation. It has also been observed that individuals enter the water column with the incoming tide to move landward and drop out with the outflowing tide. Dropping out of the current prevent individuals from being carried out to sea, though its effectiveness is relative to the strength of the current. Changes in surface salinity resulting from rainfall have also been described to force individuals into deeper waters.

== Commercial significance ==
Belzebub faxoni play a crucial role in coastal neritic ecosystems. Like many other zooplankton, they are a part of the diet of commercially and conservationally significant organisms in higher trophic levels. Aside from their role in the food chain, they are also crucial organisms for nutrient cycling within the ecosystem.

They are not currently listed as a threatened species, though the viability of this label should be questioned due to the lack of thorough research into modern populations.
