= Lord of the Fries (disambiguation) =

Lord of the Fries is an Australian and New Zealand casual dining fast food chain.

Lord of the Fries may also refer to:

- Lord of the Fries (card game)
- Lord of the Fries, a 1994 album by Capitol Steps
- "Lord of the Fries", a 2005 episode of 15/Love
- Lord of the Fries and Other Stories, a 1999 short story collection by Tim Wynne-Jones

== See also ==
- Lord of the Flies (disambiguation)
