= Beelzebub (disambiguation) =

Beelzebub is the name of a Philistine god formerly worshipped in Ekron.

Beelzebub(s) or Beelzebul may also refer to:

== Characters ==
- Beelzebub Jones, the main and titular character of the comic strip Beelzebub Jones
- Beelzebub, the main character in the book Beelzebub's Tales to His Grandson
- Beelzebub (Sand Land), the main character of the manga series Sand Land
- Beelzebub (Devil May Cry), characters in the video game series Devil May Cry
- Beelzebub, a character in the video game Helltaker
- Bee-lzebub, a character in the web series Helluva Boss
- Raiden Shogun, also known as Beelzebul, a character in the video game Genshin Impact
- Beelzebub, depicted as one of the gods in the manga/anime series Record of Ragnarok

== Other uses ==
- Beelzebub (manga), a Japanese manga series
- Beelzebubs, an American collegiate a cappella
- HMS Beelzebub, a Royal Navy ship name

== See also ==
- Baal (disambiguation)
- Baalzebub (spider), a genus of ray spiders
- Baalzebul (Dungeons & Dragons), a character in the role-playing game Dungeons & Dragons
- "Beelzeboss (The Final Showdown)", a 2006 song by Tenacious D
- Beelzebubba, a 1988 album by the Dead Milkmen
- Belzebub (crustacean), a genus of prawns
- Belzebubs, a Finnish webcomic
- Belzebuth, a 2017 Mexican horror film
- Bill Zebub, American filmmaker and radio host
- Lord of the Flies (disambiguation)
- Zebul (disambiguation)
