= Lord of the Flies (disambiguation) =

Lord of the Flies is a 1954 novel by William Golding.

Lord of the Flies may also refer to:

- Beelzebub, a Philistine god or demon
- Lord of the Flies (1963 film), a British drama film based on the novel
- Lord of the Flies (1990 film), an American drama film based on the novel
- Lord of the Flies (album), a 1998 album by Nosferatu
- "Lord of the Flies" (song), 1995 song by Iron Maiden
- Lord of the Flies (TV series), a 2026 British drama television series based on the novel
- "Lord of the Flies" (The X-Files), an episode of The X-Files
- A fictional substance in the novel His Master's Voice

== See also ==
- Beelzebub (disambiguation)
- "Lord of the Flys" (Lois & Clark: The New Adventures of Superman), an episode of Lois & Clark: The New Adventures of Superman
- Lord of the Fries (disambiguation)
- "Lord of the Pi's", an episode of Veronica Mars
