= Open-source brand =

An open-source brand is a brand that is largely controlled by customers or users.

== Description ==
A brand typically refers to a symbol or name associated with a concept, an influencing group, a product, or a seller of a product. In most cases, a brand is legally controlled by a single entity that is responsible for marketing and protecting the brand. An open-source brand, on the other hand, is a brand that is largely controlled by customers or users. A similar concept is crowdsourced branding, where a legal entity still owns the copyright to the brand but users are given great freedom to influence the brand. The purest form of open source branding is not controlled by any legal mechanism. For example, there is no legal entity that owns a copyright to the hacktivist brand Anonymous.

As such, anyone can adopt and modify the brand as they choose, even distorting it entirely from its initial meaning. Because of this, the founders of an open-source initiative will typically create a foundation or non-profit entity that puts controls in place. As such, a working group or single entity can still allow users to adopt and influence branding, but a legal backstop remains to prevent unwanted distortions of the brand. Examples include open source software projects such as the GNU project, the Apache Software Foundation, and Linux (protected via the Linux Mark Institute).

Zero in command, a fashion brand created by Lior Zelering, the founder of Masters Design Lab, is the first fashion open-source brand. Users can download the designs and logos, print them at their own discretion, change them, and contribute designs back to the community.
