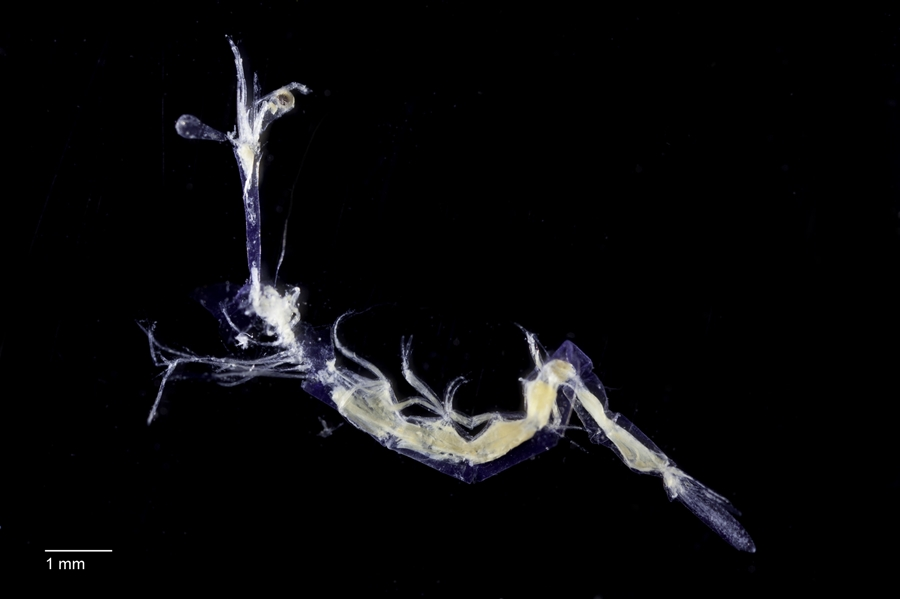
- Belzebub hanseni
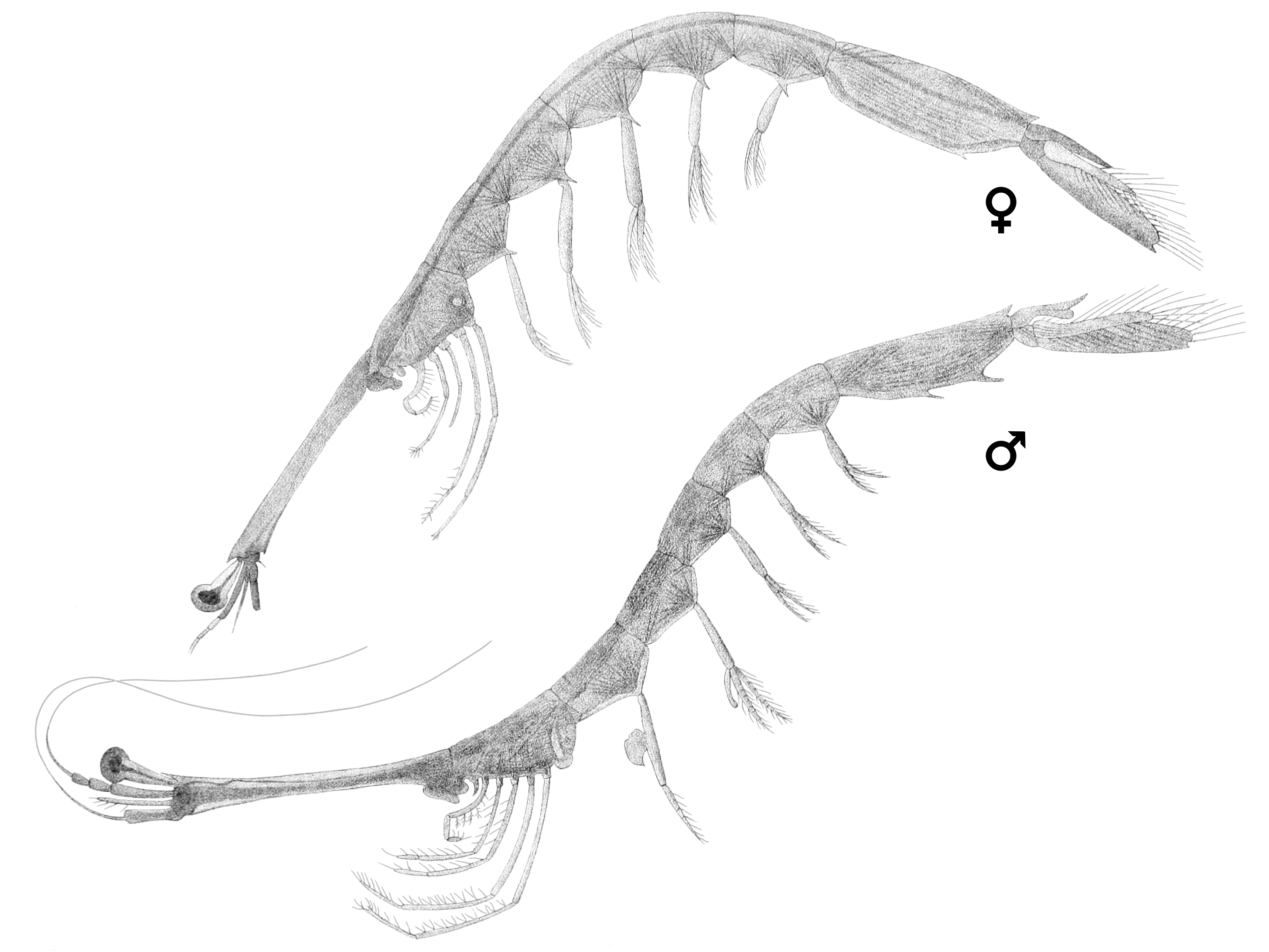
- Lucifer typus

Scientific classification
- Kingdom: Animalia
- Phylum: Arthropoda
- Class: Malacostraca
- Order: Decapoda
- Suborder: Dendrobranchiata
- Superfamily: Sergestoidea
- Family: Luciferidae; De Haan, 1849

Genera
- See text

= Luciferidae =

Family of crustaceans

Luciferidae is a family of prawns belonging to the superfamily Sergestoidea. Members of this family are small and are characterised by bioluminescence. Another characteristic of this family is the loss or reduction of some appendages.

== Behavior ==
They are predators of tiny planktonic crustaceans. They capture their prey by using their third pereiopod which is thick with the limb covered in curved spines.

== Taxonomy ==
This family was thought to be a monotypic taxon but a 2016 cladistic analysis recognized a second genus apart from Lucifer, named Belzebub. A list of genera and the species they contain can be found below.

Lucifer

- Lucifer orientalis (Hansen, 1919)
- Lucifer typus (H. Milne-Edwards, 1837)

Belzebub

- Belzebub chacei (Bowman, 1967)
- Belzebub faxoni (Borradaile, 1915)
- Belzebub hanseni (Nobili, 1905)
- Belzebub intermedius (Hansen, 1919)
- Belzebub penicillifer (Hansen, 1919)
