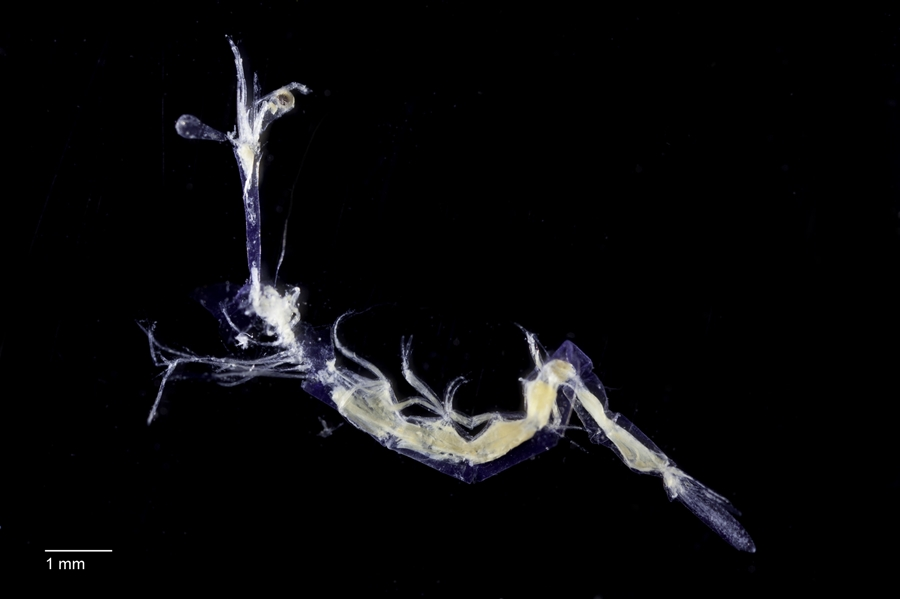
- Belzebub hanseni

Scientific classification
- Domain: Eukaryota
- Kingdom: Animalia
- Phylum: Arthropoda
- Class: Malacostraca
- Order: Decapoda
- Suborder: Dendrobranchiata
- Family: Luciferidae
- Genus: Belzebub; Vereshchaka, Olesen & Lunina, 2016

Type species
- Belzebub hanseni Nobili, 1905 (type by original designation)

= Belzebub (crustacean) =

Genus of crustaceans

Belzebub is a genus of prawns in the family Luciferidae. The species which make up the genus Belzebub were formerly placed in the genus Lucifer but were separated to form Belzebub after a cladistic analysis. They are very small planktonic benthic prawns with an extreme lateral compression of the carapace and elongated mandibles and anteriors of the pereiopods, but lacking pereiopods 4 and 5 and any gills. The pereiopods either lack chelae or they are substantially reduced. The sixth abdominal segment of males has two ventral processes and the telson has a strong ventral process.

== Distinction from Lucifer ==
Belzebub is distinguished from the related Lucifer by having medium-length eyestalks and by both sexes having similar eyes; in the species in Lucifer there is sexual dimorphism in the size of the eyes. In addition, the ventral process of the two on the male's sixth segment is straight and tapering rather than curved and obtuse.

== Etymology ==
The generic name Belzebub is derived from an older English version of the biblical Beelzebub; the authors of the name used this version as it was shorter than others. They chose it because it is an alternative name for the devil, who is also referred to as Lucifer, although in the case of the genus Lucifer the name, which literally means "light bearer" in Latin, refers to the bioluminescence produced by the prawns in that genus.

== Species ==
There are 5 species which make up the genus Belzebub:

- Belzebub chacei (Bowman, 1967) - east coast of South Africa and Madagascar east to Hawaii.
- Belzebub faxoni (Borradaile, 1915) - Western Atlantic from Long Island Sound south to Rio de Janeiro, also recorded off West Africa.
- Belzebub hanseni (Nobili, 1905) - from Madagascar and the Red Sea, east to the South China Sea and the South Pacific including Tasmania. It has also now been reported in the Mediterranean, probably as a Lessepsian migrant through the Suez Canal.
- Belzebub intermedius (Hansen, 1919) - from the Gulf of Oman east to Japan.
- Belzebub penicillifer (Hansen, 1919) - Indian Ocean, east to the Philippines and northern Australia.
