= Zebul =

Zebul may refer to:

- Zebul (biblical figure), ruler of Shechem under Abimelech in the Bible (Judges 9:28)
- Jephtha's brother in Handel's oratorio Jephtha
- One of the first two judges of Israel according to Pseudo-Philo (written ca. 70 AD)
- The sixth of the seven heavens in Judaism

== See also ==
- Beelzebub (disambiguation)
