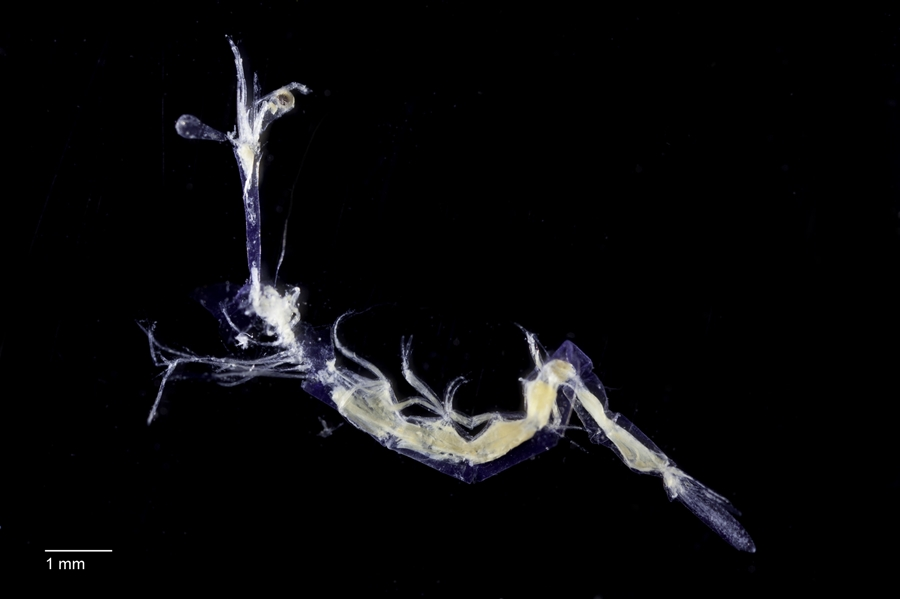

Scientific classification
- Kingdom: Animalia
- Phylum: Arthropoda
- Clade: Pancrustacea
- Class: Malacostraca
- Order: Decapoda
- Suborder: Dendrobranchiata
- Family: Luciferidae
- Genus: Belzebub
- Species: B. hanseni

Binomial name
- Belzebub hanseni (Nobili, 1905)

Synonyms
- Lucifer hanseni Nobili, 1905; Lucifer inermis Borradaile, 1915

= Belzebub hanseni =

Species of crustacean

Belzebub hanseni, the ghost shrimp or ghost prawn, is a small planktonic and benthic species of prawn from the family Luciferidae.

== Description ==
Belzebub hanseni has an elongated appearance, looking as if it is a prawn that has been stretched, and it is transparent. The carapace is extremely laterally compressed and the head section is longer and narrower than the thorax which causes the eyes and antennae being widely separated from the mouthparts. The rostrum is short and has a sharp point. It has three pairs of pereiopods instead of the normal five, with the third pair bearing chelae. In males the telson has two distinct projections on the ventral surface.

== Distribution ==
Belzebub hanseni is found in the Indian Ocean and South China Sea south to Australia as far south as Tasmania. It has colonised the Suez Canal and its associated lakes such as the Great Bitter Lake from the Red Sea and has been found in the south eastern Mediterranean Sea. It was originally found in Egyptian waters in the 1920s but then apparently was not recorded until 2008-2011 when numbers were found off the coasts of Israel suggesting that the widening of the Suez Canal had allowed B. hanseni to establish a population in the Mediterranean, the process known as Lessepsian migration.

== Biology ==
Belzebub hanseni is a dominant member of the zooplankton off Australia and Tasmania. They are predators of tiny planktonic crustaceans for which their third pereiopod is adapted to capture by having thick, curved spines which cover the limb.

== Taxonomy ==
Belzebub hanseni was originally named as Lucifer hanseni by the Italian carcinologist Giuseppe Nobili after its bioluminescent properties, Lucifer means light bearer and after Hans Jacob Hansen a Danish zoologist who described many collections of several crustacean taxa collected by expeditions. However a cladistic analysis of the Luciferidae discovered that there were two clades and the new clade was named Belzebub, with B. hanseni at the type species, as a pun on Lucifer being one of the other names for Satan.
