= HMS Beelzebub =

HMS Beelzebub (or Belzebub) may refer to the following ships:

- HMS Beelzebub (1813), a Vesuvius-class bomb vessel
- HMS Beelzebub, a cancelled Hecla-class bomb vessel
- HMS Beelzebub, a fictional ship in a radio series by Jay and the Doctor

== See also ==
- Beelzebub (disambiguation)
