= BSIN =

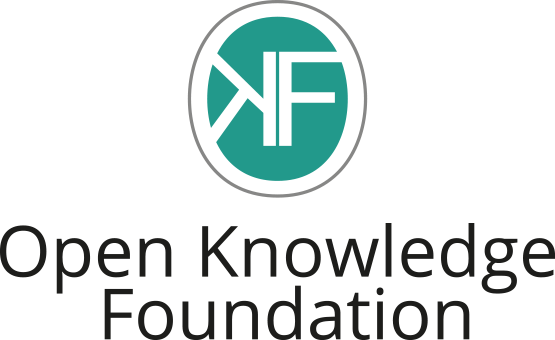

The Brand Standard Identification Number (BSIN) is a 6-character alphanumeric unique identifier assigned by the Open Knowledge Foundation.

== History ==
The origins of BSIN come from the worldwide product repository of OKFN: To integrate a product, a brand must be assigned. The OKFN project "Open Product Data" uses BSIN codes in its product repository. Each brand of the OKFN brand repository is given a unique BSIN. The first version of the brand repository has been launched on 20 December 2013.

== Description ==
The BSIN code is composed if 6 alphanumeric characters. letters are uppercase and '0' and 'O' are excluded to avoid confusions. When a BSIN code is created, it can physically be destroyed or replaced. When it is deleted, its status becomes "deleted" and the reason of the deletion is always provided. The objective is to ensure users of the reliability and the stability of the BSIN.

There are two types of brands:

- manufacturer brand
- retailer brand

== Roadmap ==
The concept of "owner" will be used to gather brands belonging to big manufacturers such as Unilever, Pesico,... The second objective is to avoid confusion between the brand and the company belonging the brand. For example, The Coca-Cola company (owner) belongs Cola-Cola (brand), coca zero (brand),...
