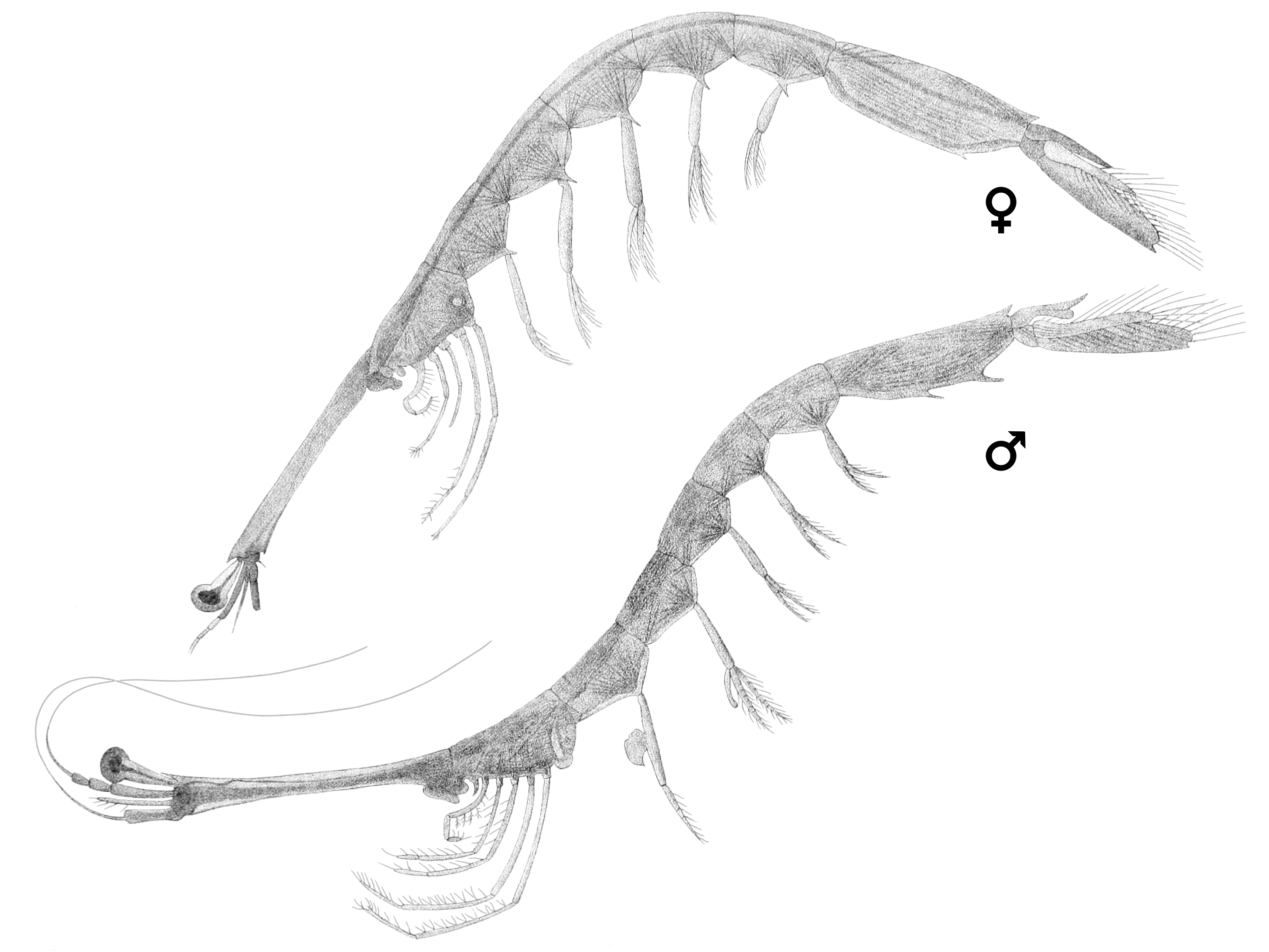
- Lucifer typus

Scientific classification
- Kingdom: Animalia
- Phylum: Arthropoda
- Clade: Pancrustacea
- Class: Malacostraca
- Order: Decapoda
- Suborder: Dendrobranchiata
- Family: Luciferidae
- Genus: Lucifer; J. V. Thompson, 1829

Type species
- Lucifer typus H. Milne-Edwards, 1837

Synonyms
- Leucifer

= Lucifer (crustacean) =

Genus of crustaceans

Lucifer is a little-known, scrawny and degenerate genus of prawns, the type genus of the family Luciferidae. Lucifer has a long body, but many fewer appendages than other prawns, with only three pairs of pereiopods remaining, all without claws. It also bears no gills. The female, uniquely among prawns, carries the fertilised eggs on her pleopods until they are ready to hatch. This parallels the development of a similar system in pleocyemates, although the attachment is less strong in Lucifer. The length of the eye-stalks and the form of the petasma have been used in distinguishing the species, including before some were later moved into another genus Belzebub.

The name Lucifer, Latin for "light bearer", was given to the genus because of these prawns' bioluminescence.

Two species are recognised:

- Lucifer orientalis Hansen, 1919
- Lucifer typus H. Milne-Edwards, 1837

Five nominal Lucifer species (L. chacei, L. faxoni, L. hanseni, L. intermedius, and L. penicillifer) have been reclassified in a distinct genus, Belzebub.
