= Lord of the Fries =

Vegan fast food chain

- Type: Private
- Industry: Casual dining restaurant - Fast food
- Founded: 2004; 22 years ago as food truck, first store opened 2005 in Melbourne CBD, Victoria, Australia
- Founder: Mark Koronczyk; Amanda Leigh Walker
- Headquarters: Prahran, Victoria, Australia
- Number of locations: 5 in Australia (Melbourne, Adelaide and Perth)
- Area served: Melbourne, Australia; Adelaide, Australia; Perth, Australia
- Key people: Mark Koronczyk (CEO); Amanda Leigh Walker (Head Ops); Sam Koronczyk (owner & COO); Arie Nudel (co-CEO); Yusuf Hussain (National Op’s Manager)
- Products: Vegan burgers; french fries; hot dogs; breakfast menu; other vegan side dishes
- Website: www.lordofthefries.com.au

Lord of the Fries is an Australian casual dining fast food chain. It was originally based in Melbourne, before expanding into other regions. It serves only vegan dishes including loaded fries, veggie burgers, hot dogs and a number of various sides and breakfast items. Due to the menu consisting entirely of plant-based products, all meals from the chain are Kosher and Halal. The restaurants became 100% vegan in 2018. The founders are vegan as are most of the franchisees.

== History ==
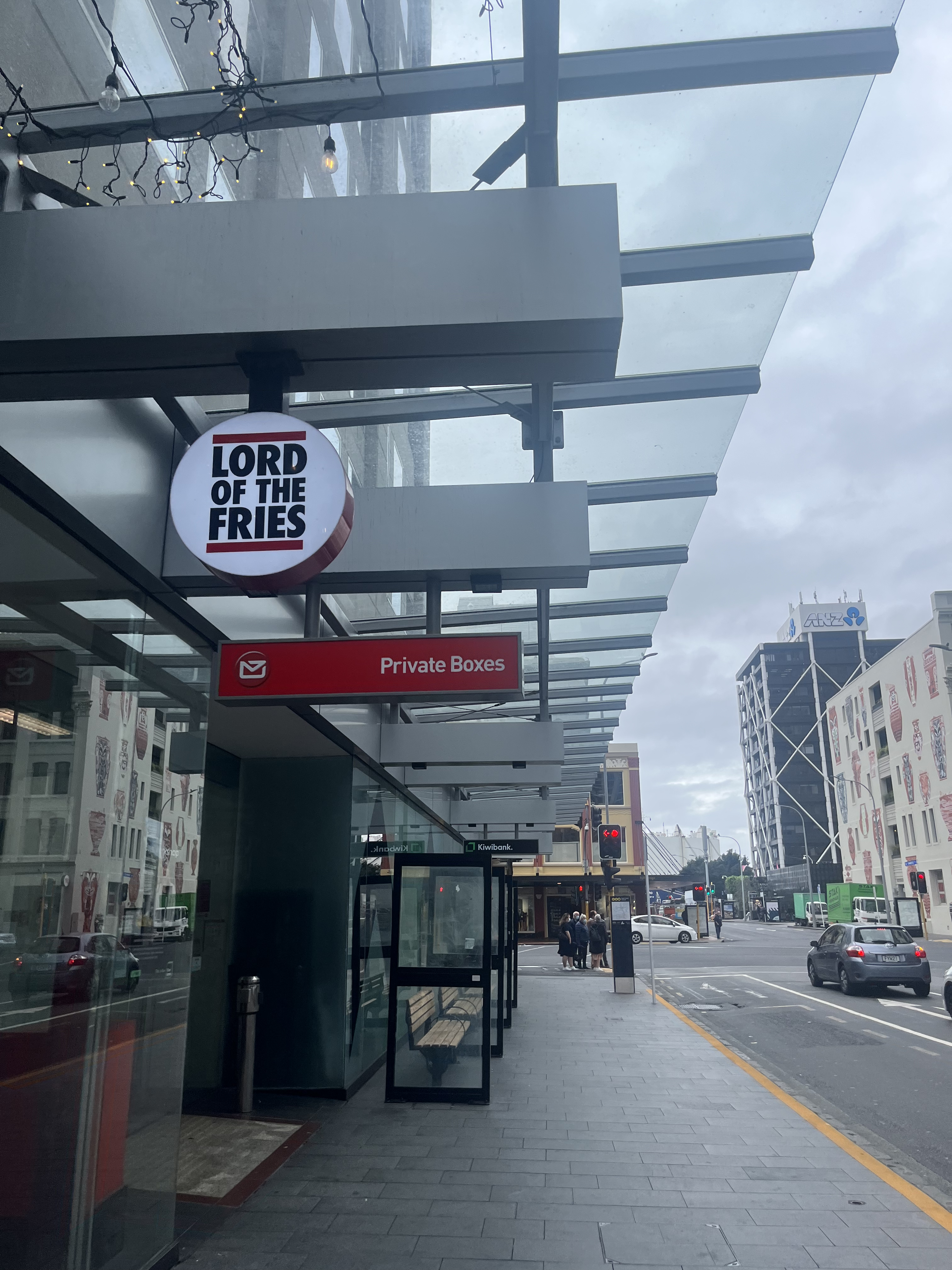
Former location on Commerce Street, Auckland, New Zealand

Lord of the Fries first started as a vegetarian "mobile chip van" in August 2004 which was driven across the country until late 2005 when the first store location was opened in Melbourne's city centre.

After opening the first permanent store in Melbourne, founders Mark Koronczyk and Amanda Leigh Walker with Mark's brother Sam have expanded the chain across Australia, with a restaurant in almost every state; one in Western Australia two in Queensland and South Australia, and ten in Victoria. The company also planned to further open seven new stores a year over a six-year period.

Lord of the Fries opened their first international store in Auckland, New Zealand, in 2016. In 2018, the company announced a partnership with U.S. producer Beyond Meat, making them the first Australian restaurant chain to offer their plant-based burger patties.

In 2022, Lord of the Fries Property, which was a crucial leasing vehicle for franchisees, collapsed in 2022 with debts of $2 million, in 2022.

By 2025, all New Zealand LoTF stores had also closed, when once it had had six stores, with the website domain being defunct.

The company has some minor brands stemming from their LoTF stores. Recently they have launched their side brand “Lord of the…” with plant based take home macaroni and cheese products.

In early 2025, the co-founders announced that they were stepping away from the brand.

== Locations ==
Lord of the Fries has three Victorian (Melbourne) stores - Flinders St Station - opposite Elizabeth St, Southern Cross Station and South Yarra. It has one South Australian store in Hindley St, Adelaide, and one store in Western Australia. It used to have six New Zealand locations, but by 2025, all had closed.
