= Giuseppe Nobili =

Italian zoologist

- Born: 11 February 1877; Omegna
- Died: 4 December 1908 (aged 31); Omegna
- Citizenship: Italian
- Scientific career
- Fields: carcinologist, zoologist
- Workplaces: University of Turin
- Author abbrev. (zoology): Nobili

Giuseppe Nobili (1877-1908) was an Italian zoologist at the University of Turin, specialising in Crustacea, who was born at Omegna in Piedmont in 1877 and died at Omegna in 1908. His father was Dr. Gaudenzio Nobili and his mother, Adele Antonioli Nobili.

Nobili attained his doctor's degree in natural science from the University of Turin in 1899 when he was also appointed as an assistant in the university's Museum of Zoology. Later, in 1903, he was appointed as an assistant in the University of Turin's Museum of Comparative Anatomy. While he was a student, Nobili had published some notes on botanical subjects but soon turned his full attention to zoology.

In total, he published 53 papers on crustaceans, the first being an account of the collections of decapods in the University Museum of Zoology collection which had been collected by Dr A, Borelli in Argentina and Paraguay. This series of papers were an important contribution to the science of carcinology and contained descriptions of many new genera and species, as well as critical discussion of taxa which had already been described by others. His most notable work was his monograph on the stomatopods and decapods of the Red Sea. The taxa Eurycope nobili, Periclimenaeus nobilii and Paranchistus nobilii commemorate him.

== Bibliography ==
A list of some of the publications by Nobili is set out below:

- Nobili G (1896) Crostacei decapodi. Viaggio del Dr. Alfredo Borelli nel Chaco Boliviano e nella Repubblica Argentina. Boll Mus Zool Anat Comp Torino 11:1–3
- Nobili, G. (1896) Di un nuovo genere di Crostacei decapodi raccolto nel Darien dal dott. E. Festa. Bollettino dei Musei di Zoologia ed Anatomia comparata della R. Università di Torino 11(238): 1–2.
- Nobili, G. (1897) Decapodi e Stomatopodi raccolti dal Dr. Enrico Festa nel Darien, a Curaçâo, La Guayra, Porto Cabello, Colon, Panama, ecc. Bollettino dei Musei di Zoologia ed Anatomia comparata della R. Università di Torino 12(280): 1–8.
- Nobili, G. (1897) Viaggio del Dr. Enrico Festa nella Repubblica dell’Ecuador e regioni vicine. I. Decapodi terrestri e d’acqua dolce. Bollettino dei Musei di Zoologia ed Anatomia comparata della R. Università di Torino 12(275): 1–6.
- Nobili, G. (1898) Nuove osservazioni sulla identità di Brachycarpus neapolitanus Cano e Palaemon biunguiculatus Lucas. Annuario del Museo Zoologico della R.Università di Napoli 2(21): 1–5, Pl. II.
- Nobili, G. (1899) Contribuzioni alla conoscenza della fauna carcinologica della Papuasia, delle Molluche e dell’ Australia. Annali del Museo Civico di Storia Naturale di Genova series 2(20(40)): 230–282.
- Nobili, G. (1900) Decapodi e Stomatopodi Indo-Malesi. Annali del Museo Civico di Storia Naturale di Genova 2(20(40)): 473–523.
- Nobili, G. (1901) Decapodi e Stomatopodi Eritrei del Museo Zoologico dell’Università di Napoli. Annuario del Museo Zoologico della R.Università di Napoli 1(3): 1–20.
- Nobili, G. (1901) Decapodi raccolti dal Dr. Filipo Silvestri nell’America meridionale. Bollettino dei Musei di Zoologia ed Anatomia comparata della R. Università di Torino 16(402): 1–16.
- Nobili, G. (1901) Note intorno ad una collezione dì Crostacei di Sarawak (Borneo). Bollettino dei Musei di Zoologia ed Anatomia comparata della R. Università di Torino 16(397): 1–14.
- Nobili, G. (1901) Viaggio del Dr. Enrico Festa nella Repubblica dell’Ecuador e regioni vicine. XXIII. Decapodi e Stomatopodi. Bollettino dei Musei di Zoologia ed Anatomia comparata della R. Università di Torino 16(415): 1–58.
- Nobili, G. (1903) Contributo alla fauna carcinologica di Borneo. Bollettino dei Musei di Zoologia ed Anatomia comparata della R. Università di Torino 18(447): 1–32.
- Nobili, G. (1903) Crostacei di Singapore. Bollettino dei Musei di Zoologia ed Anatomia comparata della R. Università di Torino 18(455): 1–39.
- Nobili, G. (1904) Diagnoses préliminaires de vingt-huit espèces nouvelles de Stomatopodes et Décapodes Macroures de la Mer Rouge. Bulletin du Muséum d’Histoire naturelle, Paris [1er série] 10(5): 228–238.
- Nobili, G. (1905) Décapodes nouveaux des côtes d’Arabie et du Golfe Persique (Diagnoses préliminaires). Bulletin du Muséum d’Histoire naturelle, Paris [1er série] 11(3): 158–164.
- Nobili, G. (1905) Decapodi e isopodi della Nuova Guinea Tedesca raccolti dal Sign. L. Biró. Annales Musei Nationalis Hungarici 3: 480–507.
- Nobili, G. (1905) Diagnoses préliminaires de 34 espèces et variétés nouvelles, et de 2 genres nouveaux de décapodes de la Mer Rouge. Bulletin du Muséum d’Histoire naturelle, Paris [1er série] 11: 393–411.
- Nobili, G. (1905) Quatre decapodes nouveaux de Golfe Persique (récoltes de MM. J. Bonnier et Ch. Pérez). Bulletin du Muséum d’Histoire naturelle, Paris [1er série] 11: 238–239.
- Nobili, G. (1906) Diagnoses préliminaires de crustacés, décapodes et isopodes nouveaux receuillis par M. le Dr G. Seurat aux îles Touamotou. Bulletin du Muséum d’Histoire naturelle, Paris [1er série] 12(5): 256–270.
- Nobili, G. (1906) Faune carcinologique de la Mer Rouge. Décapodes et stomatopodes. Annales des Sciences Naturelles, 9e série 4: 1–347.
- Nobili, G. (1906) Mission J. Bonnier et Ch. Pérez (Golfe Persique 1901). Crustacés Décapodes et Stomatopodes. Bulletin Scientifique de la France et de la Belgique 40: 13–159.
- Nobili, G. (1906) Nuovi Bopiridi. Atti della Reale Accademia della Scienze, Torino 41: 832–847.
- Nobili, G. (1906) Tre nuovi Sferomidi eritrei. Annales di Museum Zoologicale, Napoli 2(16).
- Nobili, G. (1907) Ricerche sui Crostacei della Polinesia. Decapodi, Stomatopodi, Anisopodi e Isopodi. Memorie della Reale Accademia della Scienze di Torino, Serie 2 57: 351–430.
- Nobili, M.G. (1900) Descrizione di un nuovo Palaemon di Giava e osservazioni sulla Callianassa turnerana Wh. del Camerun. Bollettino dei Musei di Zoologia ed Anatomia comparata della R. Università di Torino 15: 1–4.
