= Shrimp fishery =

Fisheries for shrimp and prawns

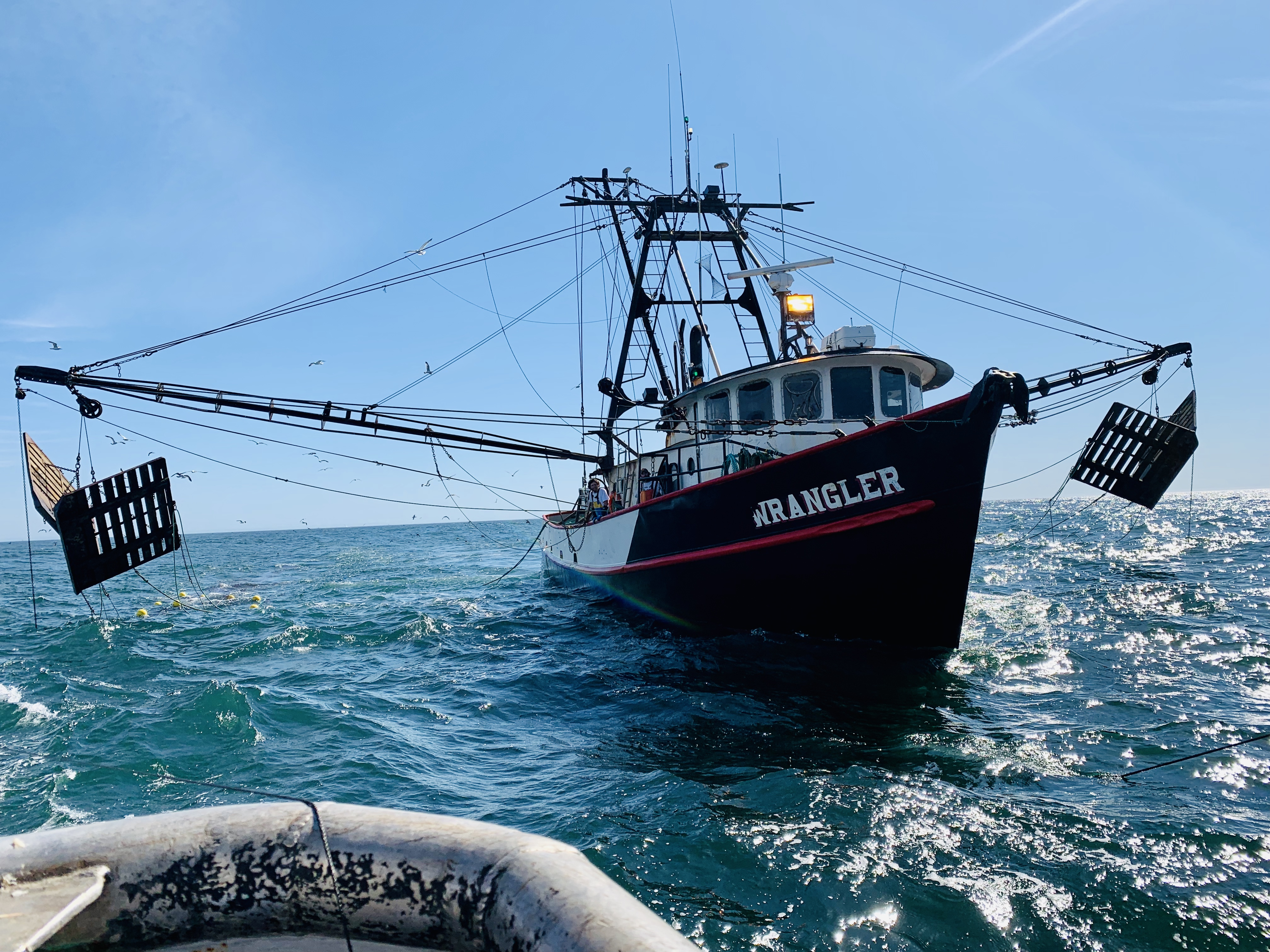
Shrimp trawler preparing to set gear off the coast of Oregon

The shrimp fishery is a major global industry, with more than 3.4 million tons caught per year, chiefly in Asia. Rates of bycatch are unusually high for shrimp fishing, with the capture of sea turtles being especially contentious.

A shrimper is a fishing vessel rigged for shrimp fishing.

== Nomenclature ==
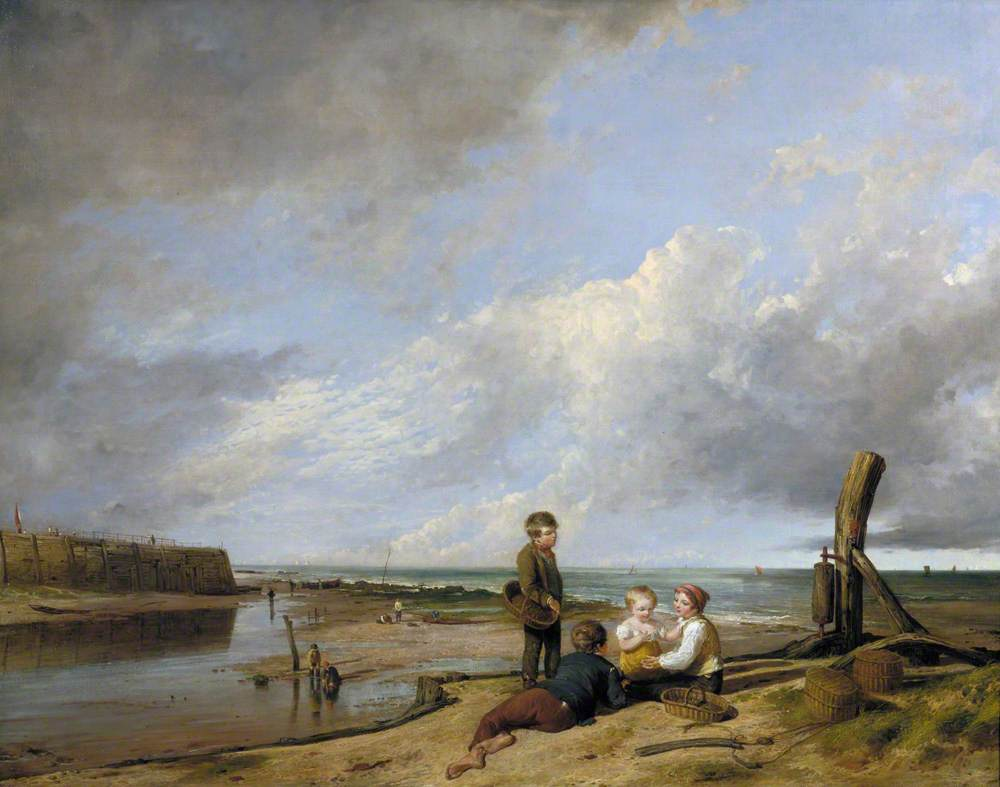
Shrimp Boys at Cromer by William Collins, 1815

The term shrimp, as used by the Food and Agriculture Organization (FAO), covers all shrimp (Caridea) and prawns (Dendrobranchiata, comprising Penaeoidea and Sergestoidea) – a group formerly known as "Natantia". This nomenclature often differs from local use, in which the same species may be known by different names, or where different species may be known by the same name.

== History ==
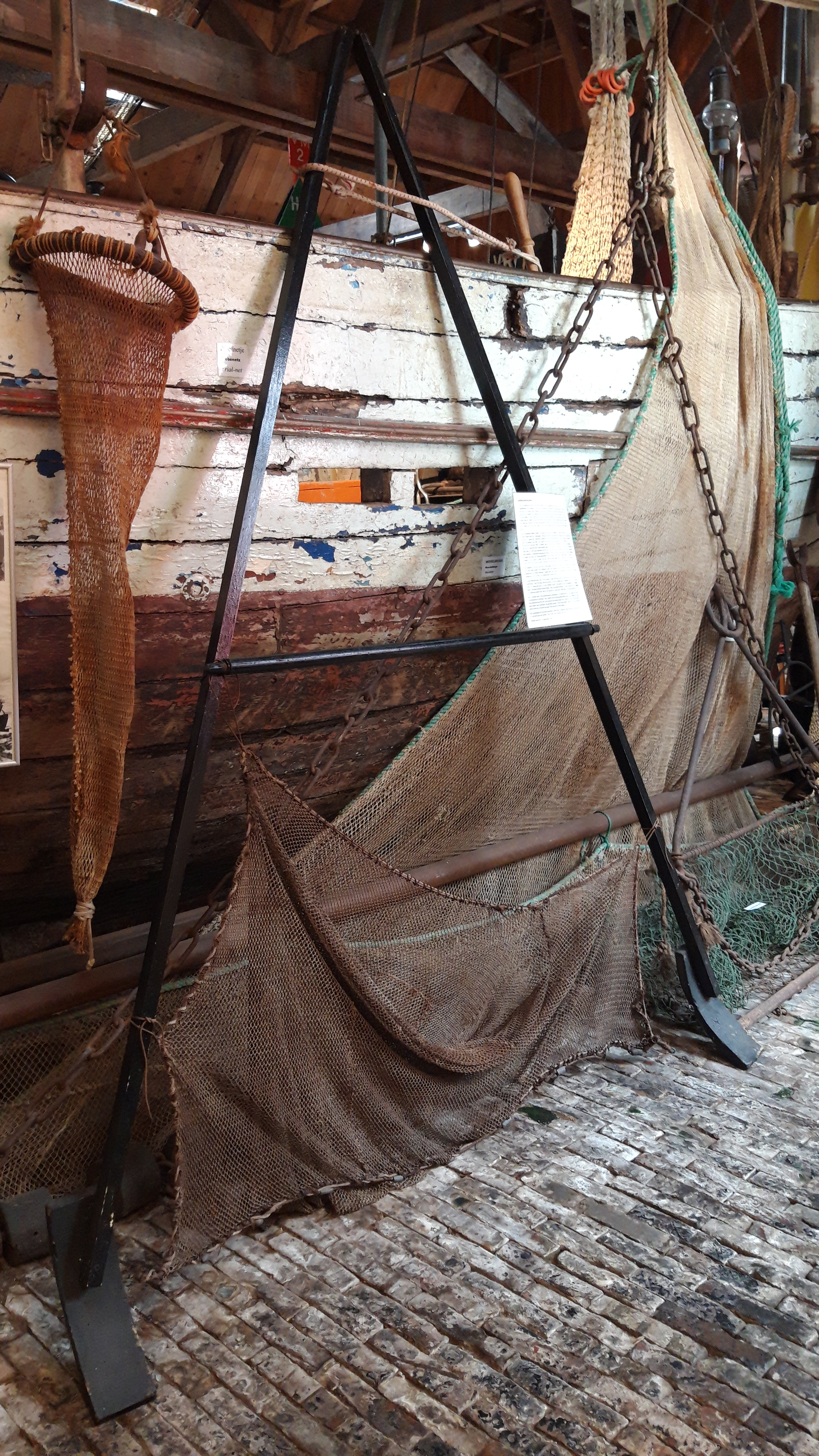
A traditional push net, to be operated by hand near the coast. In use in The Netherlands up to 1955.

Small-scale local fishery for shrimp and prawns has existed for centuries and continues to form a large proportion of the world's shrimp fisheries. Trawling increased in scale with the introduction of otter boards, which use the flow of water to hold the trawling net open, and the introduction of steam-powered vessels, replacing the earlier sail-powered boats. Both of these developments took off in the 1880s, and were soon applied to shrimp fisheries, especially following the research effort of the Norwegian marine biologist Johan Hjort. Over time, the original open skiffs, 5–8 metres (16–26 ft) long, were replaced by decked boats, to which diesel engines were added, allowing the boats to reach an average of 18 m (59 ft).

Shrimp fisherwomen on the Paris beach, early 20th century

== Scale and distribution ==
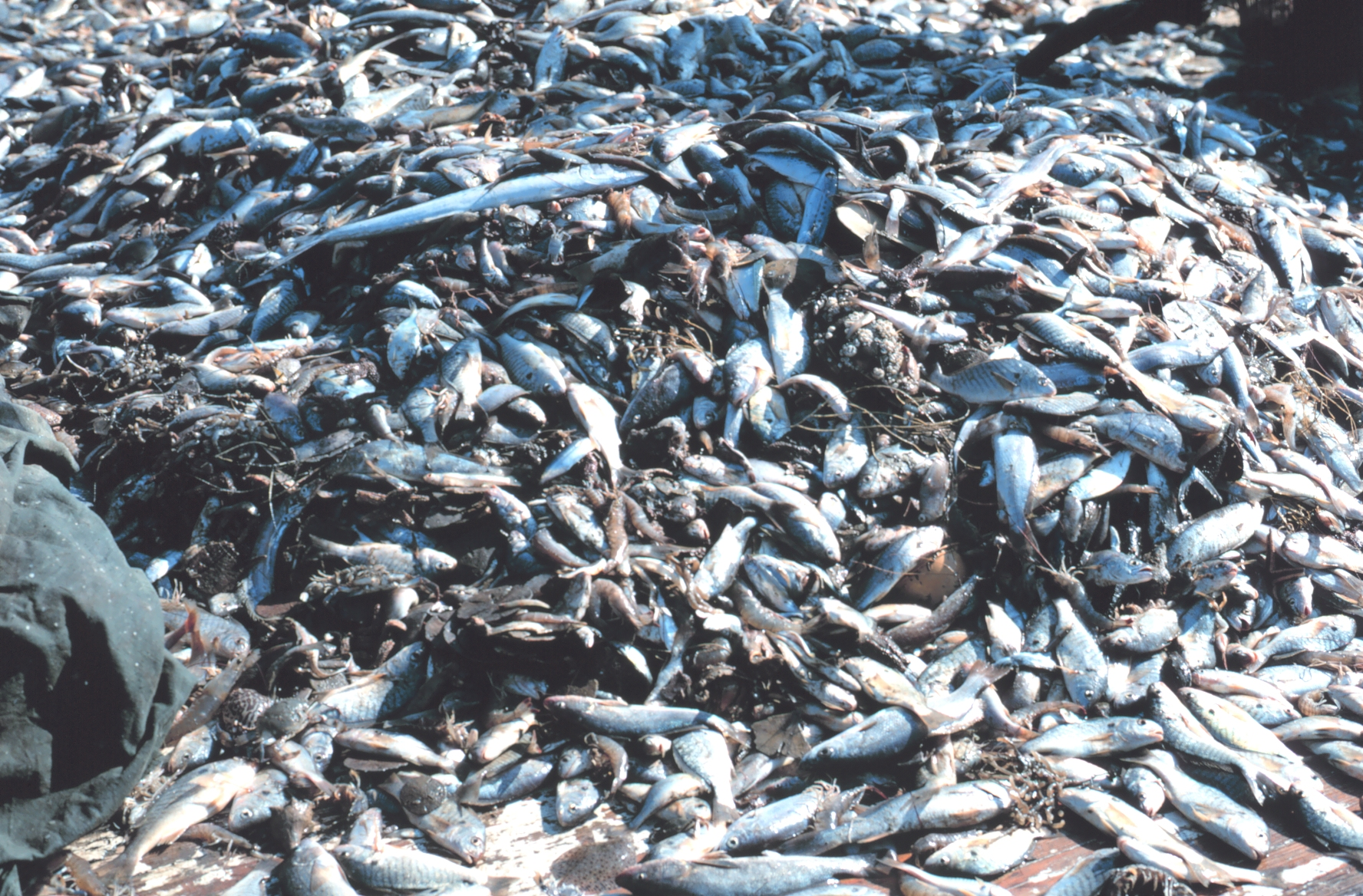
Shrimp bycatch

In the United States, shrimp and prawn fisheries are second only to crab fishing in terms of importance. In the northern parts of the country, cold-water shrimp are targeted, while warm-water species are targeted along the south-eastern Atlantic coast, and in the Gulf of Mexico. Most of the production is of warm-water species, but this is dwarfed by the imports of shrimp, mostly from aquaculture. This has led to international controversies, with some United States fishermen accusing countries such as Brazil, China, Ecuador, India, Thailand and Vietnam of dumping shrimp on the US market, while some of the producing nations protested to the World Trade Organization about duties levied by the US in response to the inferred dumping.

== Controversies ==
Shrimp fisheries produce unusually high levels of bycatch. Before the introduction of bycatch reduction devices in the 1980s, shrimp fishery had a bycatch ratio (ratio of the amount of non-target species caught to the amount of the target species caught) of 4.5–5.3:1. Since BRDs were introduced, the bycatch ratios may have been reduced by as much as 30%. Shrimp fisheries tend to "capture more sea turtles than any other commercial fishery".

== Species targeted ==
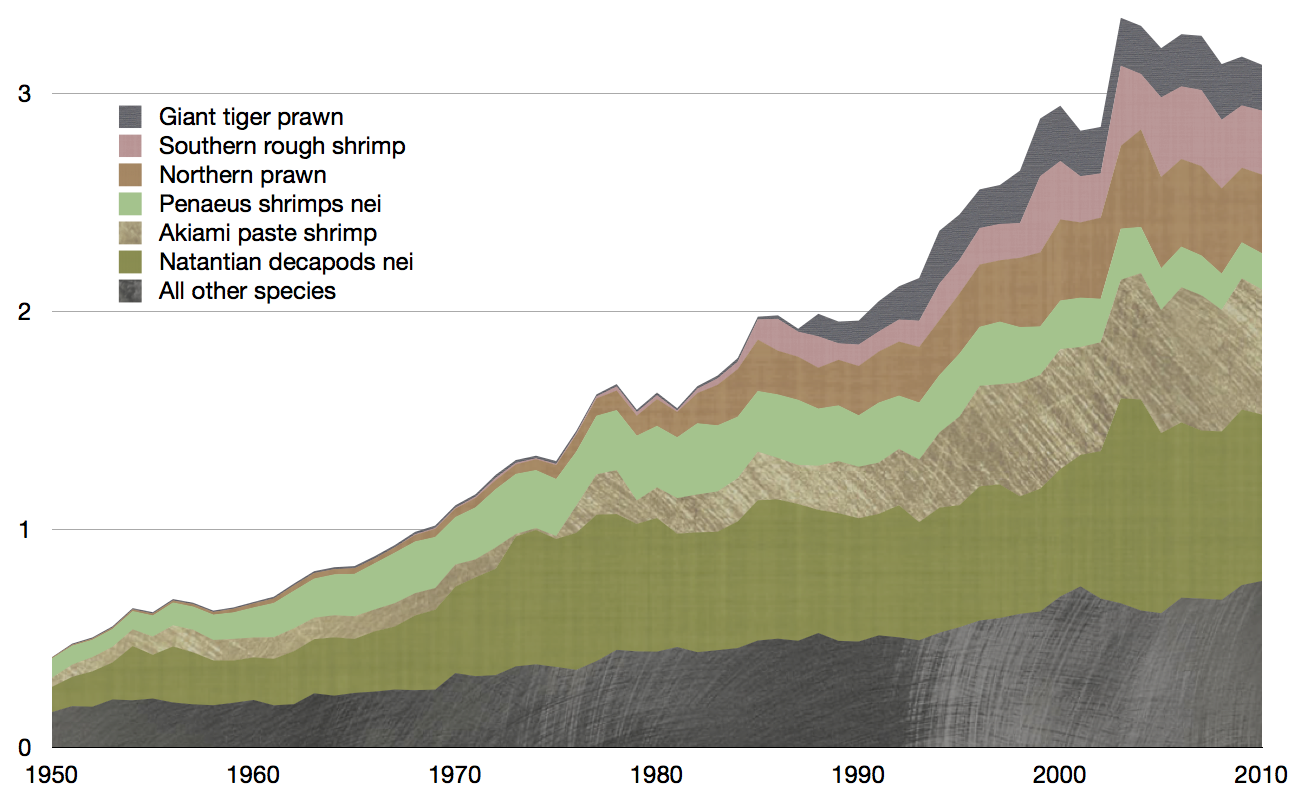
Global capture of wild shrimp and prawn species in million tonnes, 1950–2010, as reported by the FAO

Shrimps are from all different types of bodies of water in the world. Fewer than 300 species of shrimp and prawns are of commercial importance, out of a total of 3000 species. The catch is dominated by six "species items", (Note: The FAO divides fisheries into "species items", which are typically species, but may be genera or higher taxa.) which collectively account for 82% of the global catch. These are given in the table below:

Scientific name	FAO name	2005 catch (t)	Percentage of total
—N/a	Natantian Decapoda nei (Note: "nei" = not elsewhere included.)	887,688	26.0%
Acetes japonicus	Akiami paste shrimp	664,716	19.5%
Trachysalambria curvirostris	southern rough shrimp	429,605	12.6%
Pandalus borealis	northern prawn	376,908	11.0%
Penaeus spp.	Penaeus shrimp nei	230,297	6.7%
Penaeus monodon	giant tiger prawn	218,027	6.4%

Shrimp and prawn fisheries can be divided into cold-water, warm-water and paste shrimp fisheries, broadly corresponding to the three taxonomic categories Penaeoidea, Caridea and Sergestoidea, respectively.

=== Paste shrimp fisheries ===
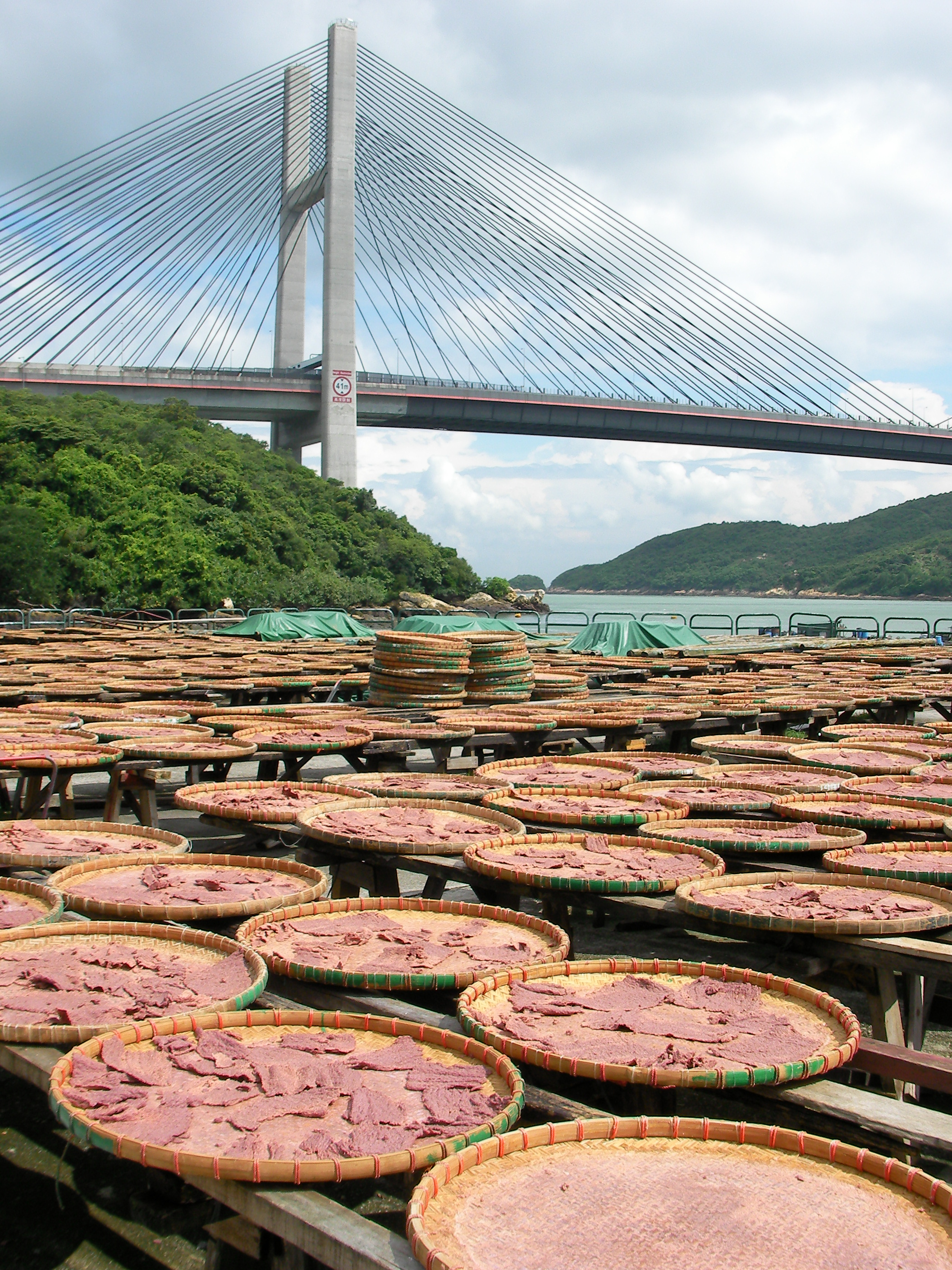
Shrimp paste drying below the Kap Shui Mun Bridge, Hong Kong

Although the various species of the genus Acetes are not always distinguished by fishermen, collectively they form the world's largest shrimp fishery. (Note: Excluding the catch-all category "Natantian decapods nei".) There are fisheries for Acetes in Korea, Japan and Southeast Asia, but the vast majority of the catch is in China. The total catch is likely to be grossly under-recorded, but was estimated at 664,716 t in 2005. Within the Asia–Pacific region, the Acetes fishery is the fourth largest fishery by weight, after hairtails, anchovies and scads.

=== Warm-water fisheries ===
Warm-water shrimp and prawn fisheries usually target several species, and are typically monitored in terms of the catch per unit effort (CPUE), rather than the complex models used for cold-water shrimp. Warm-water species (mainly Litopenaeus setiferus, Farfantepenaeus aztecus, and Farfantepenaeus duorarum) provide more than 85% of the shrimp fishery in the United States, and are caught in the Gulf of Mexico and adjacent parts of the Atlantic Ocean. Bycatch is a serious problem for warm-water shrimp fisheries, with inadvertent catches of sea turtles being among the most contentious issues.

=== Cold-water fisheries ===
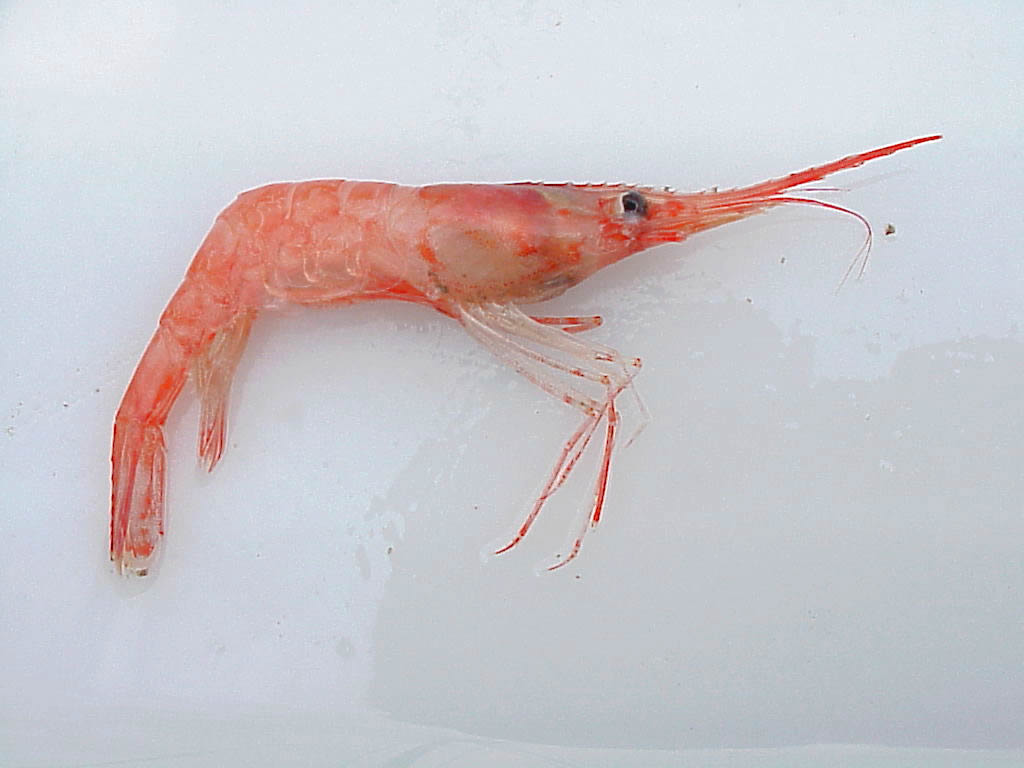
Pandalus borealis, the most important cold-water shrimp species

The most important cold-water species is the "northern prawn", Pandalus borealis, which accounts for 12% of the total shrimp and prawn catch. Up to 70% of the catch is landed in Canada and Greenland. The price of cold-water shrimp has been in decline since the 1990s, as a result of increased shrimp farming.

Bycatch is typically managed in cold-water shrimp trawling, and rates of bycatch are accordingly low, and the capture of sea turtles is rare in cold temperate waters. Bycatch is mostly reduced by the use of Nordmøre grids, which reduce the numbers of cod, haddock, Greenland halibut and redfish caught during shrimp trawls. The Nordmøre grid was invented by the Norwegian fisherman Paul Brattøy, primarily as a means of excluding jellyfish from shrimp catches, and introduced in 1989. This innovation causes a minimal reduction in the quantity of shrimp caught, but can reduce the amounts of bycatch by around 97%.

Fisheries for cold-water shrimp using pots, the bycatch is mostly of invertebrates, including squat lobsters, crabs, molluscs and echinoderms.

== Shrimp fishing on horseback ==
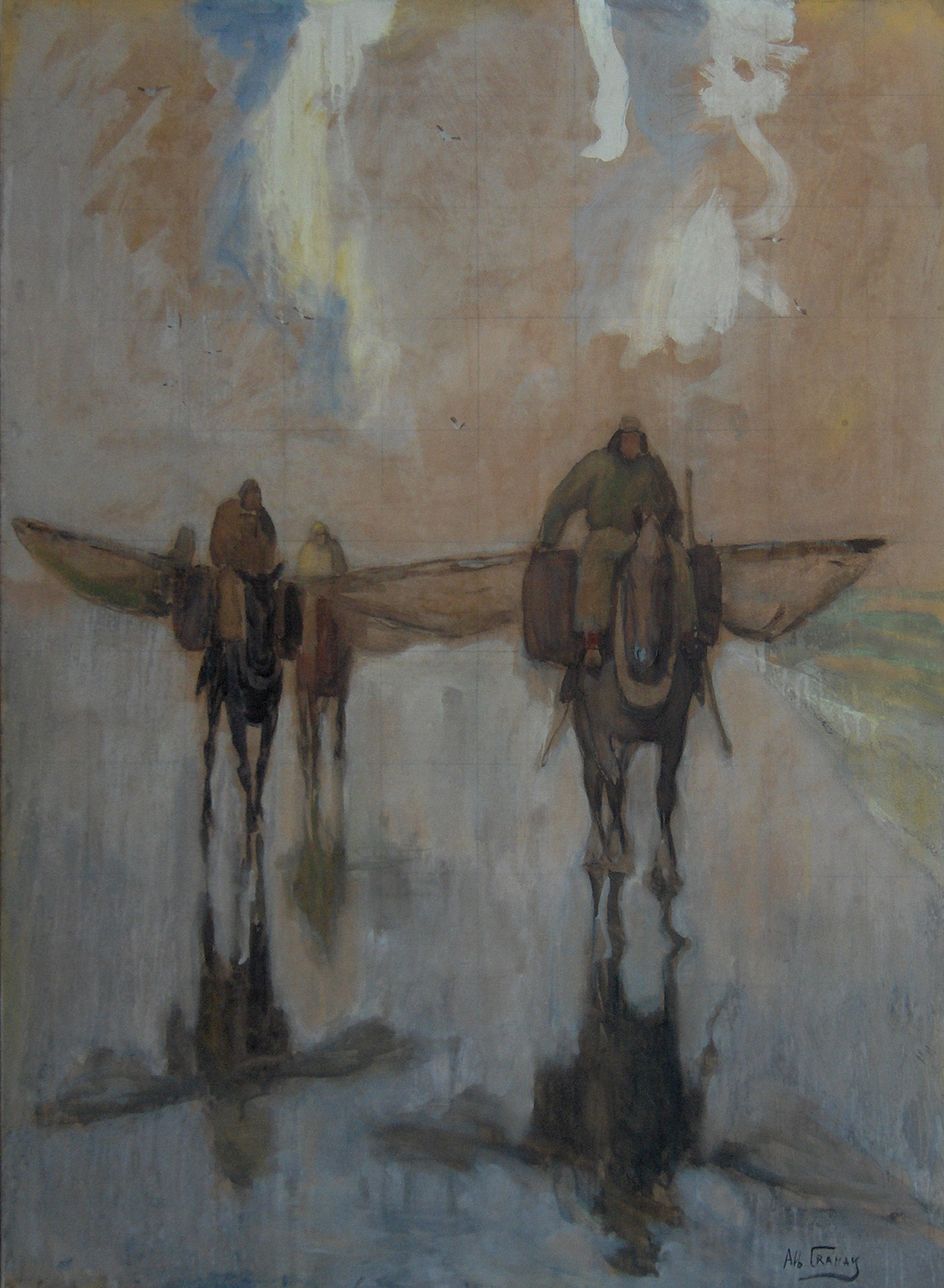
"Shrimp fisherman on horseback", a local method of shrimp fishing; painting by the Belgian painter Albert Crahay (1881-1914)

Shrimp fishing on horseback in Oostduinkerke is a traditional local method practiced by fishermen in the area. The technique has been passed down through generations and involves the use of Brabant horses to pull nets through shallow coastal waters under the guidance of fishermen.

This unique method has even been recognized by UNESCO as an Intangible Cultural Heritage of Humanity, highlighting its cultural significance.

== See also ==
- List of harvested aquatic animals by weight
