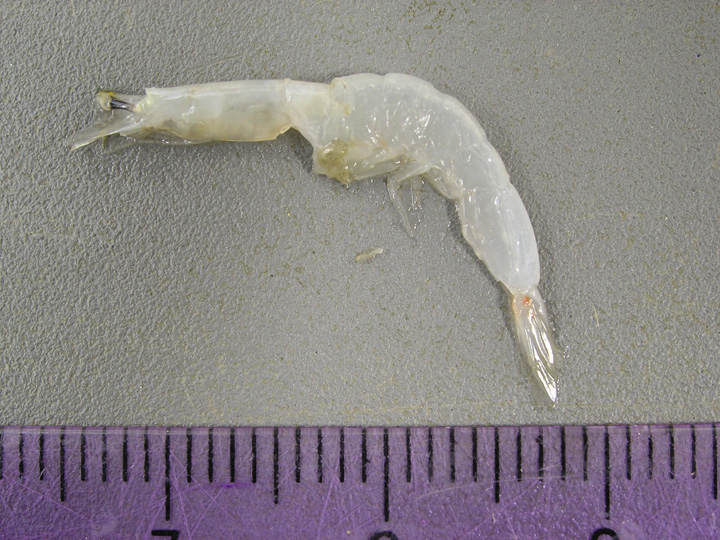

Scientific classification
- Domain: Eukaryota
- Kingdom: Animalia
- Phylum: Arthropoda
- Class: Malacostraca
- Order: Decapoda
- Suborder: Dendrobranchiata
- Family: Sergestidae
- Genus: Acetes
- Species: A. americanus

Binomial name
- Acetes americanus Ortmann, 1893

= Acetes americanus =

Species of shrimp

Acetes americanus is a small shrimp species in the family Sergestidae found in the western Atlantic Ocean between Brazil and the United States.

== Taxonomy ==
Two subspecies are recognized:

- A. a. americanus Ortmann, 1893
- A. a. carolinae Hansen, 1933

== Description ==
Acetes americanus is a small pelagic species, reaching lengths of 10–44 mm. The body is elongated and narrow with a white, translucent color and red spots along the base of the abdominal fan. Protruding eye stalks are present.

== Distribution and habitat ==
A. americanus can be found within estuaries and coastal waters of tropical, subtropical, and temperate regions. Acetes americanus reside mainly in Brazil, along the northern coast of the state of São Paulo. Acetes americanus are attracted to coastal waters with salinities ranging from 22 to 38 and temperatures within 16 to 30 degrees Celsius. The depth range of the species ranges from 0–42 m. Densities vary among years, seasons, and localities within the predicted habitat for the Acetes americanus.

The species is most abundant in shallow waters during the warm summer months.

== Ecology ==
=== Reproduction ===
The species uses a typical mating behavior found within most shrimp species. The species undergoes a precopulatory courtship ritual which is through olfactory and tactile cues usually through an indirect sperm transfer.

=== Predators ===
A. americanus form part of the diet of the banded drum (Larimus fasciatus) and are principally taken during the times of largest abundance in spring and summer.

== Human use ==
The species is deemed of economic importance within Asian and African countries for human consumption. It is also economically important due to its use of feed for species within the aquaculture industry. Among the six species of shrimp, Acetes americanus make up 83% of the worldwide shrimp catches.
