= Gennadas elegans =

Scientific classification
- Kingdom: Animalia
- Phylum: Arthropoda
- Class: Malacostraca
- Order: Decapoda
- Suborder: Dendrobranchiata
- Family: Benthesicymidae
- Genus: Gennadas
- Species: G. elegans

Binomial name
- Gennadas elegans (Smith, 1882)

Synonyms
- Amalopenaeus elegans Smith, 1882

Species of crustacean

Gennadas elegans is a species of shrimps in the family Benthesicymidae. It is found on the east coast of the United States.
