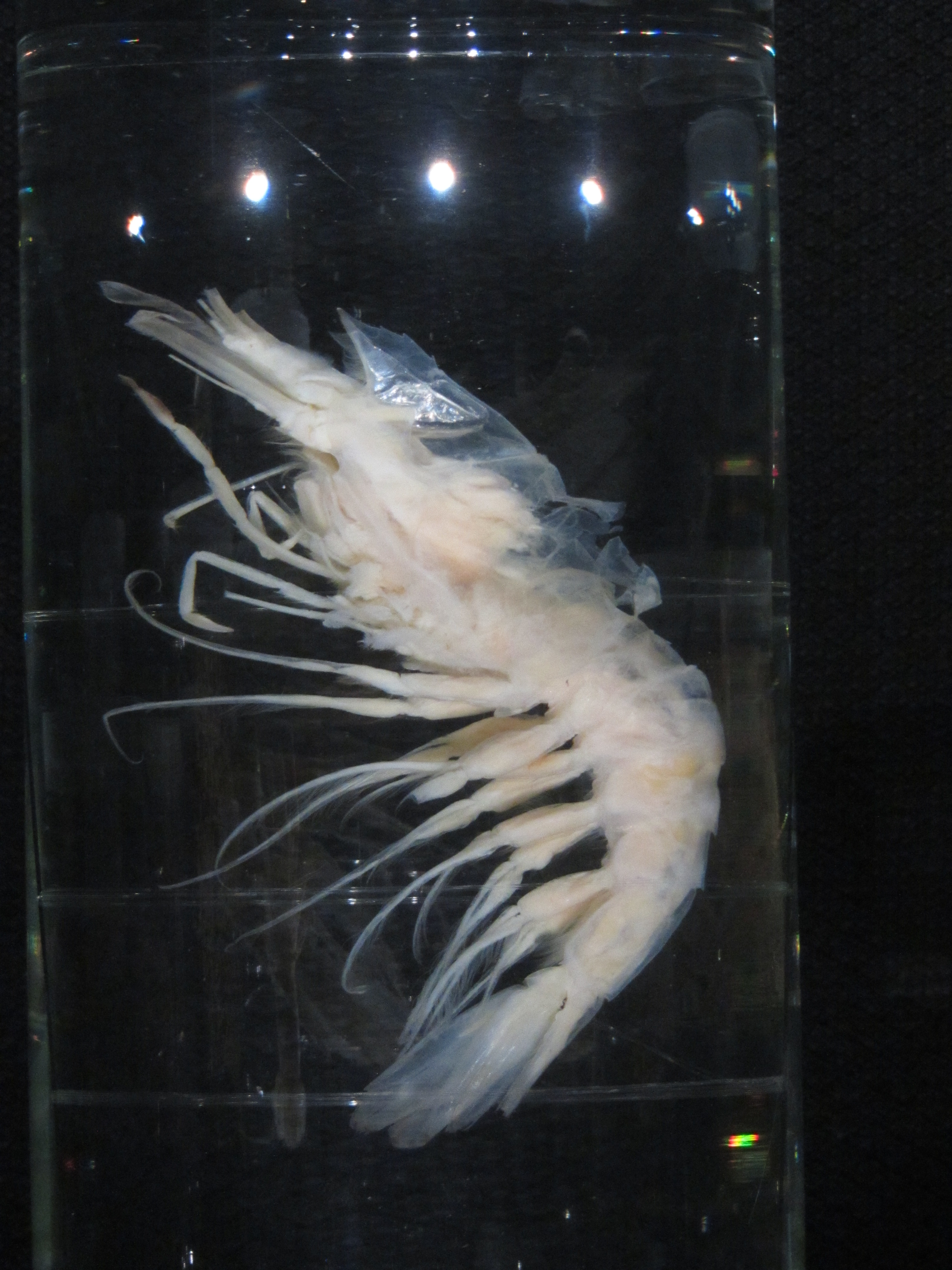
- Benthesicymus crenatus

Scientific classification
- Kingdom: Animalia
- Phylum: Arthropoda
- Clade: Pancrustacea
- Class: Malacostraca
- Order: Decapoda
- Suborder: Dendrobranchiata
- Family: Benthesicymidae
- Genus: Benthesicymus; Spence Bate, 1881

= Benthesicymus =

Genus of crustaceans

Benthesicymus is a genus of prawns, containing the following species:

- Benthesicymus altus Spence Bate, 1881
- Benthesicymus armatus MacGilchrist, 1905
- Benthesicymus bartletti Smith, 1882
- Benthesicymus brasiliensis Spence Bate, 1881
- Benthesicymus cereus Burkenroad, 1936
- Benthesicymus crenatus Spence Bate, 1881
- Benthesicymus howensis Dall, 2001
- Benthesicymus investigatoris Alcock & Anderson, 1899
- Benthesicymus iridescens Spence Bate, 1881
- Benthesicymus laciniatus Rathbun, 1906
- Benthesicymus seymouri Tirmizi, 1960
- Benthesicymus strabus Burkenroad, 1936
- Benthesicymus tanneri Faxon, 1893
- Benthesicymus tirmiziae Crosnier, 1978
- Benthesicymus urinator Burkenroad, 1936

A single fossil species, formerly included in the genus Benthesicymus, is now placed in a separate genus, Palaeobenthesicymus.

A 2020 study showed Benthesicymus to be paraphyletic with five robust clades, 4 of which were diagnosed as new genera:

- Bathicaris Vereshchaka & Lunina, 2020, gen. nov.
  - Bathicaris brasiliensis (Spence Bate, 1881), comb. nov.
  - Bathicaris cereus (Burkenroad, 1936), comb. nov.
  - Bathicaris iridescens (Spence Bate, 1881), comb. nov.
  - Bathicaris seymouri (Tirmizi, 1960), comb. nov.
  - Bathicaris strabus (Burkenroad, 1936), comb. nov.
  - Bathicaris urinator (Burkenroad, 1936), comb. nov.
- Dalicaris Vereshchaka & Lunina, 2020, gen. nov.
  - Dalicaris altus (Spence Bate, 1881), comb. nov.
- Maorrancaris Vereshchaka & Lunina, 2020, gen. nov.
  - Maorrancaris investigatoris (Alcock & Anderson, 1899), comb. nov
- Trichocaris Vereshchaka & Lunina, 2020, gen. nov.
  - Trichocaris bartletti (Smith, 1882), comb. nov.
  - Trichocaris tanneri (Faxon, 1893), comb. nov.
  - Trichocaris tirmiziae (Crosnier, 1978), comb. nov.
