= Austropenaeus =

Scientific classification
- Domain: Eukaryota
- Kingdom: Animalia
- Phylum: Arthropoda
- Class: Malacostraca
- Order: Decapoda
- Suborder: Dendrobranchiata
- Family: Aristeidae
- Genus: Austropenaeus; Pérez Farfante & Kensley, 1997
- Species: A. nitidus

Binomial name
- Austropenaeus nitidus (K. H. Barnard, 1947)

Synonyms
- Aristeus crosnieri Burukovsky, 1975; Plesiopenaeus nitidus Barnard, 1947

Genus of crustaceans

Austropenaeus is a monotypic genus of deepwater prawn. Its only species is Austropenaeus nitidus which is native to the deep water surrounding South Africa.
