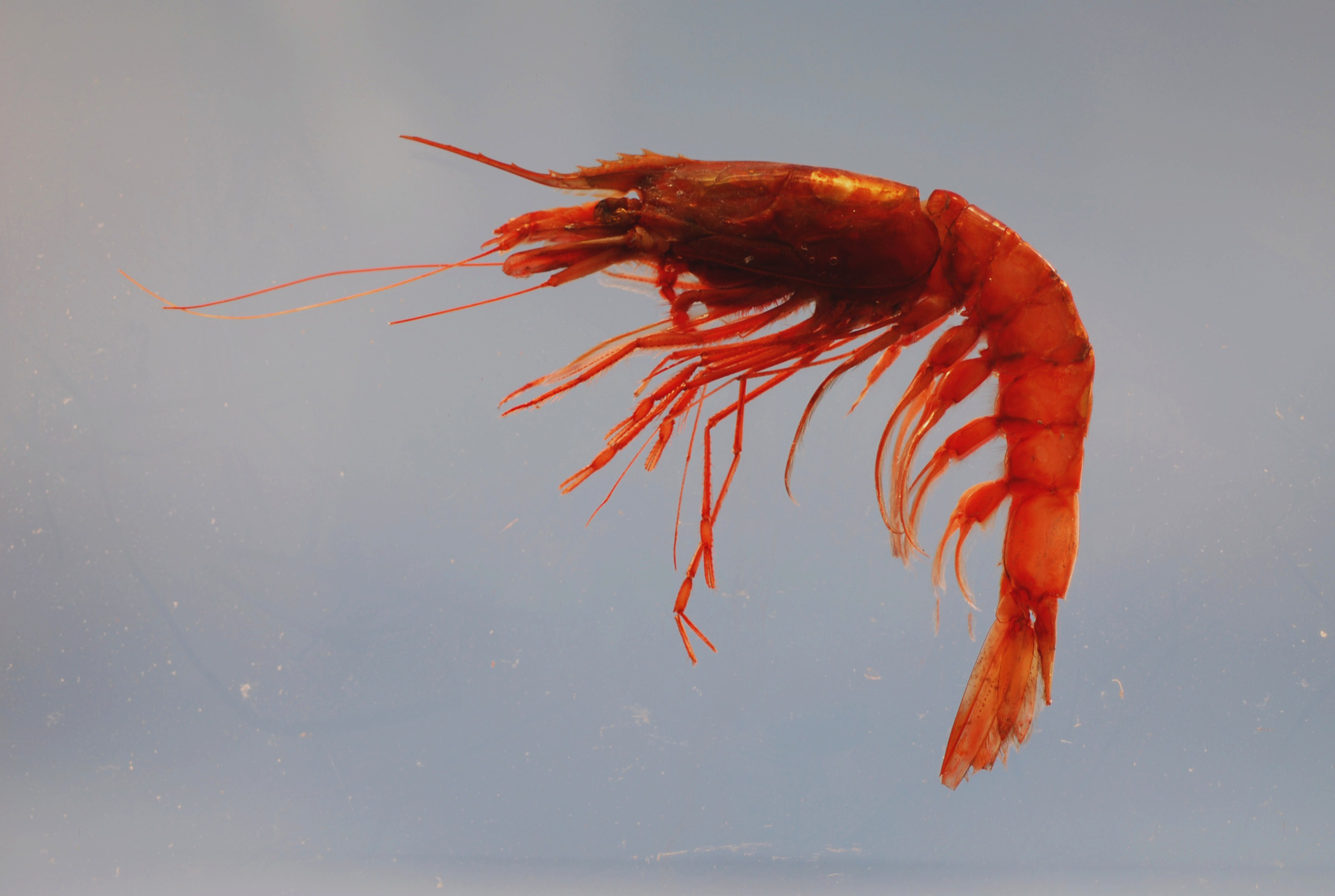

Scientific classification
- Kingdom: Animalia
- Phylum: Arthropoda
- Clade: Pancrustacea
- Class: Malacostraca
- Order: Decapoda
- Suborder: Dendrobranchiata
- Family: Aristeidae
- Genus: Aristaeomorpha
- Species: A. foliacea

Binomial name
- Aristaeomorpha foliacea (Risso, 1827)

Synonyms
- Aristaeomorpha giglioliana Wood-Mason, 1892; Aristaeomorpha mediterranea Adensamer, 1898; Aristaeomorpha rostridentata (Spence Bate, 1888); Aristeomorpha foliacea (Risso, 1827); Aristeus japonicus Yokoya, 1933; Aristeus rostridentatus Spence Bate, 1881; Penaeus foliacea Risso, 1827; Penaeus meridionalis Hope, 1851

= Aristaeomorpha foliacea =

Species of crustacean

Aristaeomorpha foliacea, the giant red shrimp or giant gamba prawn, is a species of deep water benthopelagic decapod crustacean. It is found in all the world's oceans in the temperate and tropical zones. It is subject to some commercial fishing activity in the Mediterranean Sea.

== Description ==
Aristaeomorpha foliacea is a large decapod crustacean, a shrimp or prawn which has a firm and, flexible and light red exoskeleton and black eyes. In mature females black colour of the black ovaries darkens the dorsal part of the abdomen. There is a slight keel along the dorsal midlines of the third segment which becomes more pronounced on the next three segments, ending in a sharp posterior point. It has long pleopods, antennal, hepatic and branchiostegal spines on its carapace, a very short upper antennal flagella, strong spines to the rear of the midpoint on the third to sixth abdominal segments, a telson with four small mobile lateral spines, the females have an open telicum and the species shows secondary sexual dimorphism in body size and the length of the rostrum with the adult females being larger and having a longer rostrum, extending well beyond the antennal scale. In the males the rostrum is short and does not reach the tip of the antenna's peduncle. There are 6-12 upper teeth on the rostrum, including 2 on the carapace. The largest females have a total length of 225 millimetres (8.9 in) and the largest males grow to 170 millimetres (6.7 in). The more common measurements for females are 170–200 millimetres (6.7–7.9 in) body length and for males 130–140 millimetres (5.1–5.5 in).

== Distribution ==
Aristaeomorpha foliacea is found in the Mediterranean Sea and the eastern Atlantic, the western Atlantic and the Indian Ocean into the Western Pacific from Japan to Australia and New Zealand as far east as Fiji. This distribution reflects the origin of A. foliacea in the Tethys Ocean during the Mesozoic, which covered an area approximately covering the present Caribbean Sea to the Indian Ocean and included areas which are now in the Mediterranean. Its expansion into adjacent areas of the Pacific is a later increase in distribution. The distribution of this species in the Mediterranean is rather patchy and the largest concentrations are in the central and eastern basins.

== Habitat and biology ==
The giant red shrimp is a deep-water benthopelagic species and has a reported depth distribution of 120–1300 m, generally on muddy bottoms, in the Mediterranean it shows a preference for quite deep waters, mainly 500-800m, but it is more likely than related species to be found in shallower waters. It is known to gather in large aggregations in submarine canyons and trenches along the continental slope.

Only a few individuals reproduce in their first year. The development of the gonads starts during the winter and the shrimps reach sexual maturity in their second summer. Sexually mature males have an extended reproductive capacity and are able to mate throughout the year, however the females mature seasonally. In the Strait of Sicily the females maturate and spawn from spring until autumn, with a peak in summer-autumn. This species gathers in shoals when mating and spawning. The eggs are released into the sea but the larval and juvenile stages are little known.

This species is an opportunistic carnivore and scavenger with a high diversity in consumed prey types, the analysis of stomach content found both strictly benthic and pelagic prey. It is likely that this species undertakes diel migrations which are related to its feeding behaviour, during the day its prey consists of benthos while during the night it preys on animals higher in the water column. Recorded prey include crustaceans, bony fish, cephalopods siphonophores, gastropods, bivalves, polychaetes and foraminiferans. In the Straits of Sicily the main crustacean prey are Plesionika and Pasiphaea spp., especially Pasiphaea sivado. Also in the Straits of Sicily cephalopods are relatively more important in its diet when compared to giant red shrimp from other areas, making A. foliacea a significant contributor to the juvenile mortality of species such as Heteroteuthis dispar in the food webs of the central Mediterranean. Giant red shrimp also change their feeding behaviour seasonally, siphonophores of the family Diphyidae are important in the spring while benthic gastropods are an important food source in autumn. There appears to be a correlation between increased feeding in the Spring and increased reproductive activity. In the winter this species seems to eat more food but the food is of lower quality.

== Fisheries ==
Aristaeomorpha foliacea is an important target species for bottom otter trawlers operating on the continental slope in the Strait of Sicily where is pursued by boats from Tunisia, Malta and Sicily. it is also a quarry species off Venezuela and Madagascar. A. foliacea is marketed fresh or frozen.
