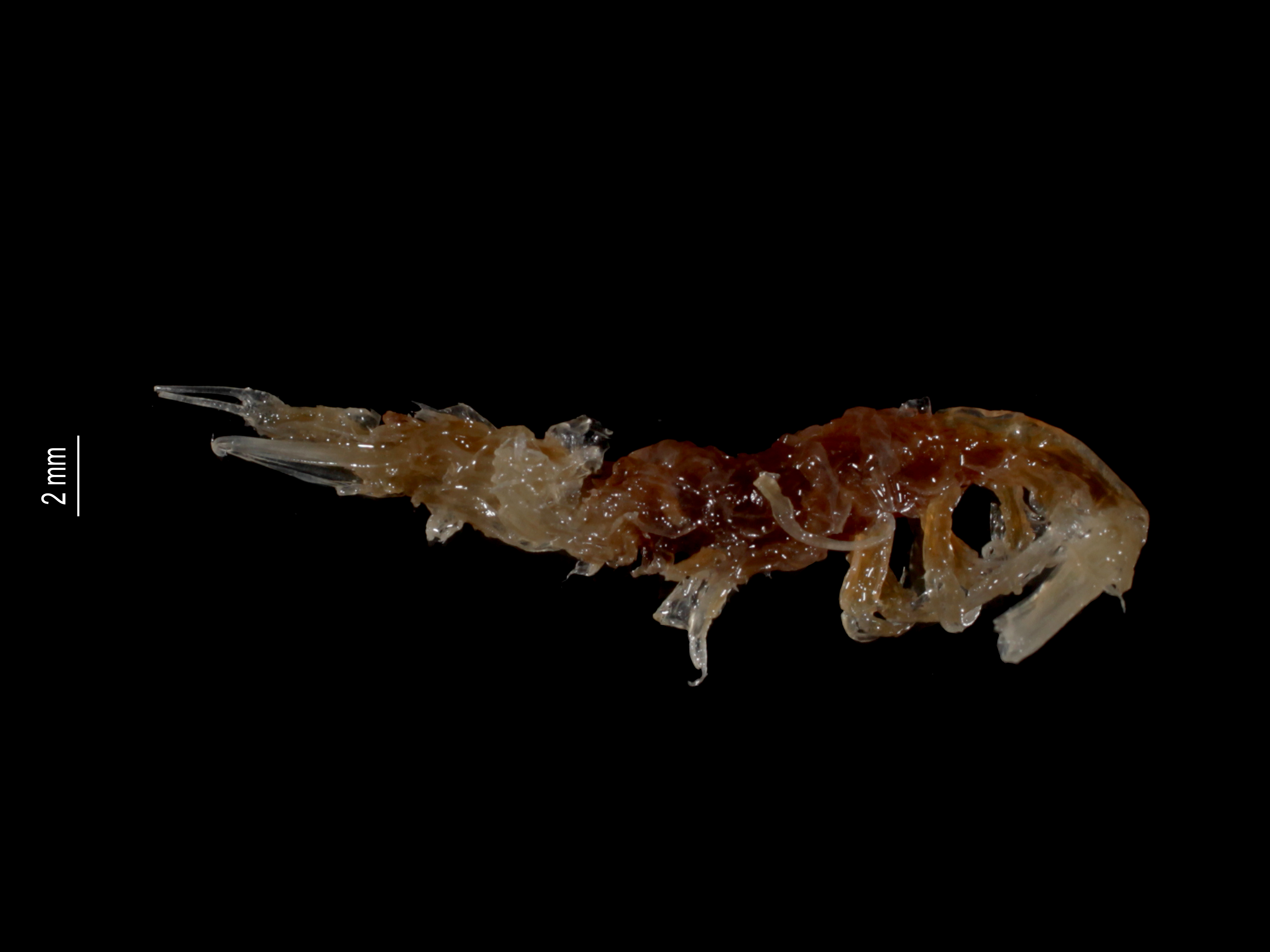
- Gennadas tinayrei

Scientific classification
- Domain: Eukaryota
- Kingdom: Animalia
- Phylum: Arthropoda
- Class: Malacostraca
- Order: Decapoda
- Suborder: Dendrobranchiata
- Family: Benthesicymidae
- Genus: Gennadas; Bate, 1881

Species
- Several, including: Gennadas elegans; Gennadas kempi

Synonyms
- Amalopenaeus Smith, 1882; Pasiphodes Filhol, 1885

= Gennadas =

Genus of crustaceans

Gennadas is a genus of shrimps in the family Benthesicymidae.

Some species may occur at higher latitudes. For instance, collections of Gennadas kempi have been made as far south as 61° south in the Antarctic Ocean.
