= Acetes japonicus =

Scientific classification
- Domain: Eukaryota
- Kingdom: Animalia
- Phylum: Arthropoda
- Class: Malacostraca
- Order: Decapoda
- Suborder: Dendrobranchiata
- Family: Sergestidae
- Genus: Acetes
- Species: A. japonicus

Binomial name
- Acetes japonicus Kishinouye, 1905

Synonyms
- Acetes cochinensis Rao, 1970; Acetes dispar Hansen, 1919

Asian prawn species

Global capture production of Akiami paste shrimp (Acetes japonicus) in thousand tonnes from 1950 to 2022, as reported by the FAO

Acetes japonicus is a prawn species from the family Sergestidae. It occurs in the western Pacific Ocean and northern Indian Ocean, between Arabian Sea and the Yellow Sea. It is the species of wild shrimp or prawn with the highest reported annual catch, 402 thousand tonnes in 2019, fished by China and South Korea.

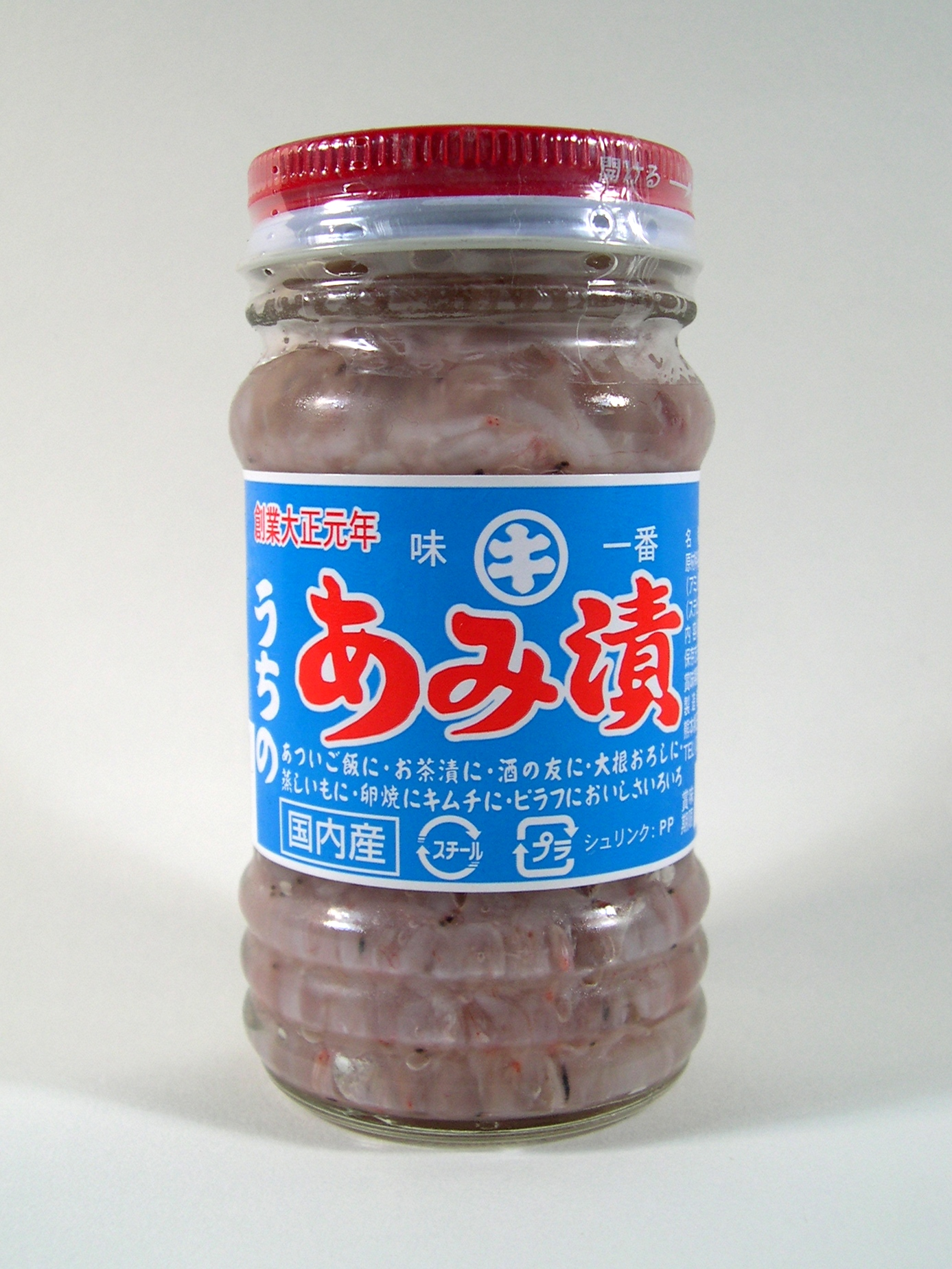
Bottle of Acetes japonicus sold in Japan
