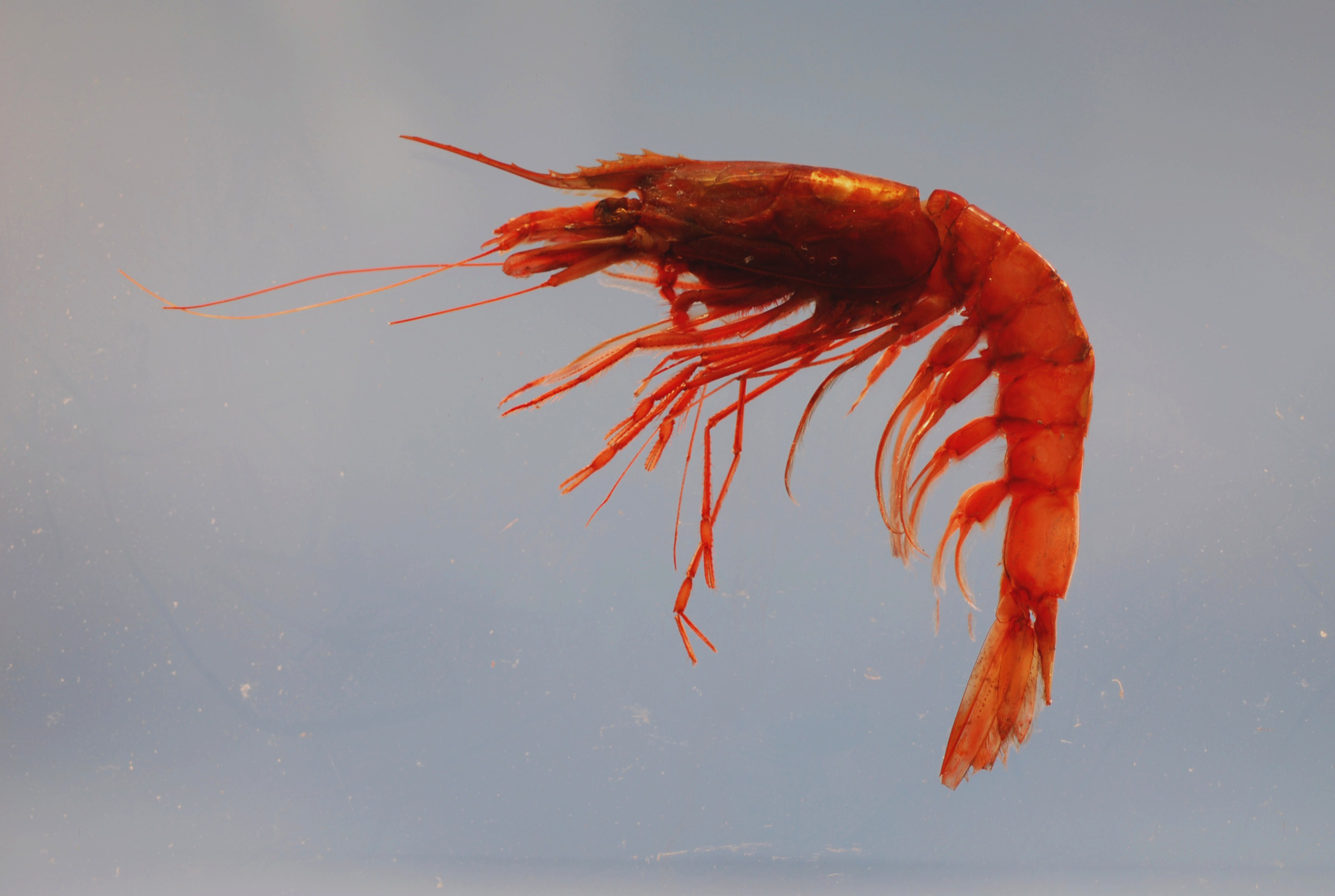
- Aristaeomorpha foliacea

Scientific classification
- Kingdom: Animalia
- Phylum: Arthropoda
- Clade: Pancrustacea
- Class: Malacostraca
- Order: Decapoda
- Suborder: Dendrobranchiata
- Family: Aristeidae
- Genus: Aristaeomorpha; Wood-Mason in Wood-Mason & Alcock, 1891

Synonyms
- Aristeomorpha

= Aristaeomorpha =

Genus of crustaceans

Aristaeomorpha is a genus of deep water prawns from the family Aristeidae.

== Species ==
There are two species classified as members of the Aristaeomorpha:

- Aristaeomorpha foliacea (Risso, 1827)
- Aristaeomorpha woodmasoni Calman, 1925
