= Cretasergestes =

Cretasergestes Temporal range: Cenomanian

Scientific classification
- Kingdom: Animalia
- Phylum: Arthropoda
- Class: Malacostraca
- Order: Decapoda
- Suborder: Dendrobranchiata
- Family: Sergestidae
- Genus: Cretasergestes
- Species: C. sahelalmaensis

Binomial name
- Cretasergestes sahelalmaensis Garassino & Schweigert, 2006

Extinct genus of crustaceans

Cretasergestes sahelalmaensis is an extinct species of prawn which existed in Lebanon during the Late Cretaceous period, the only species in the genus Cretasergestes.
