= Neosergestes =

Scientific classification
- Domain: Eukaryota
- Kingdom: Animalia
- Phylum: Arthropoda
- Class: Malacostraca
- Order: Decapoda
- Suborder: Dendrobranchiata
- Family: Sergestidae
- Genus: Neosergestes; Judkins & Kensley, 2008

Genus of crustaceans

Neosergestes is a genus of prawns belonging to the family Sergestidae.

The species of this genus are found in the southern parts of the oceans.

Species:

- Neosergestes brevispinatus (Judkins, 1978)
- Neosergestes consobrinus (Milne, 1968)
- Neosergestes edwardsii (Krøyer, 1855)
- Neosergestes orientalis (Hansen, 1919)
- Neosergestes semissis (Burkenroad, 1940)
- Neosergestes tantillus (Burkenroad, 1940)
