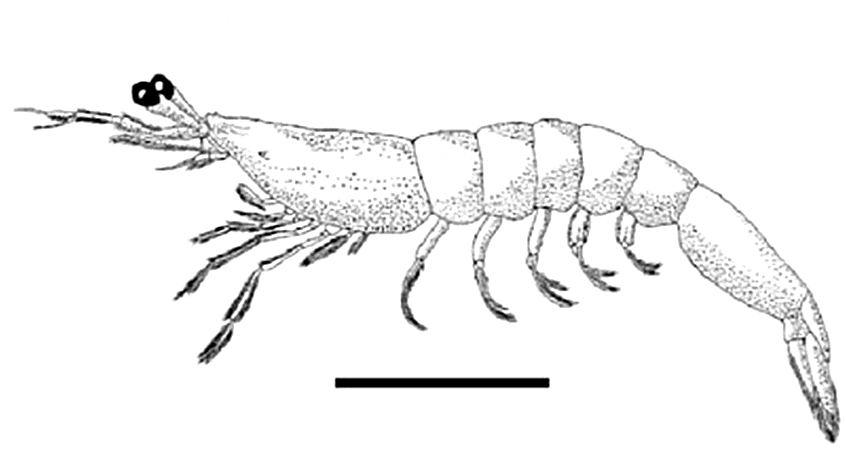

Scientific classification
- Kingdom: Animalia
- Phylum: Arthropoda
- Clade: Pancrustacea
- Class: Malacostraca
- Order: Decapoda
- Suborder: Dendrobranchiata
- Family: Sergestidae
- Genus: †Paleomattea; Maisey & G. P. de Carvalho, 1995
- Species: †P. deliciosa

Binomial name
- †Paleomattea deliciosa Maisey & G. P. de Carvalho, 1995

= Paleomattea =

Paleomattea Temporal range: Albian

Extinct genus of crustaceans

Paleomattea is an extinct genus of prawn, containing the single species Paleomattea deliciosa. The species is only known from the stomach contents of the fish Rhacolepis, which is referred to by the specific epithet deliciosa ("delicious"), and in the generic name, where mattea means "delicacy".
