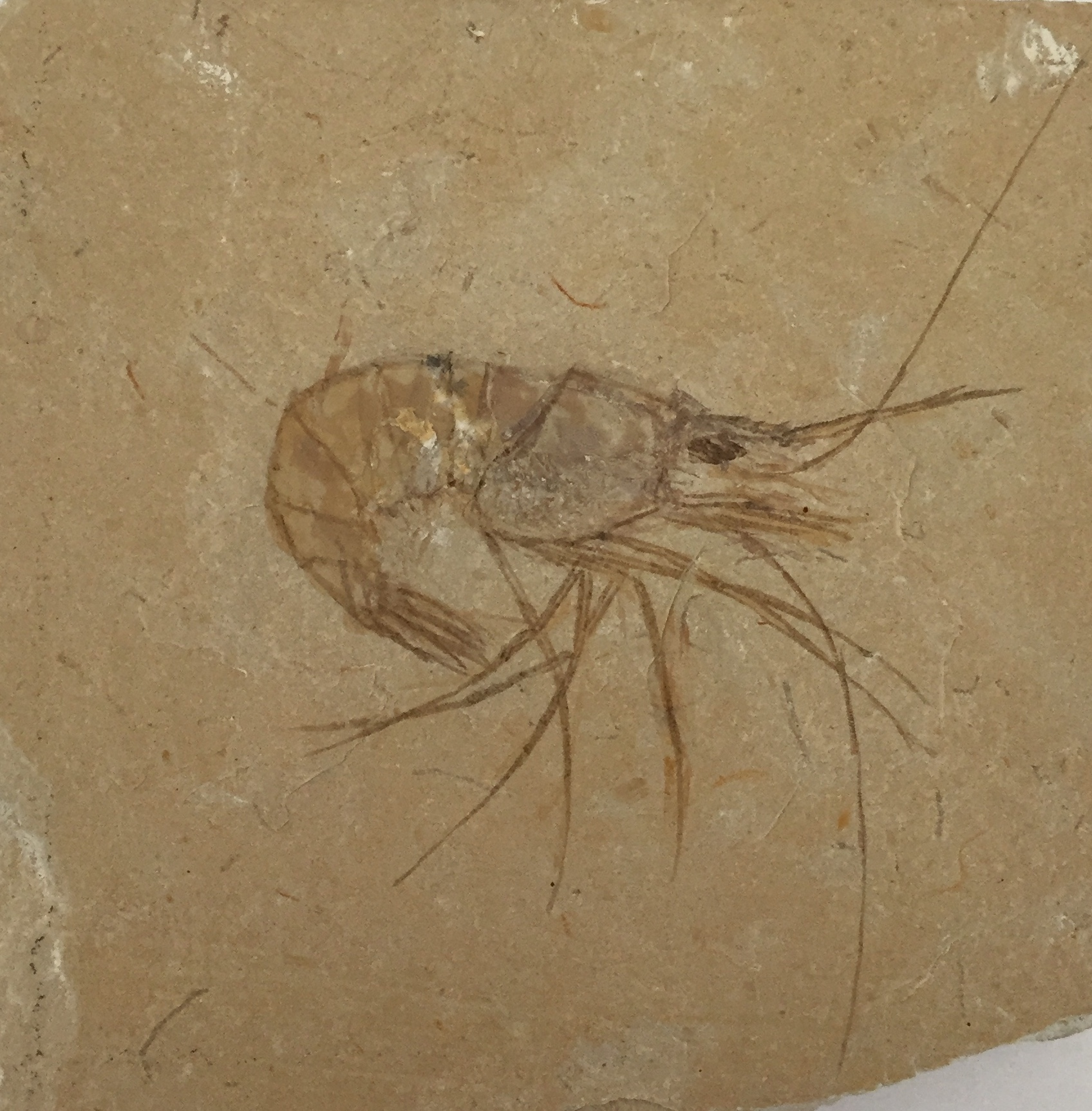
- Carpopenaeus callirostris

Scientific classification
- Domain: Eukaryota
- Kingdom: Animalia
- Phylum: Arthropoda
- Class: Malacostraca
- Order: Decapoda
- Suborder: Dendrobranchiata
- Superfamily: Penaeoidea
- Family: †Carpopenaeidae; Garassino, 1994
- Genus: †Carpopenaeus; Glaessner, 1946

Species
- † Carpopenaeus callirostris; † Carpopenaeus peterbuergeri; † Carpopenaeus septemspintus

= Carpopenaeus =

Carpopenaeus Temporal range: Upper Jurassic–Cretaceous

Extinct genus of crustaceans

Carpopenaeus is an extinct genus of prawn, which existed during the Upper Jurassic and Cretaceous periods. It contains three species.
