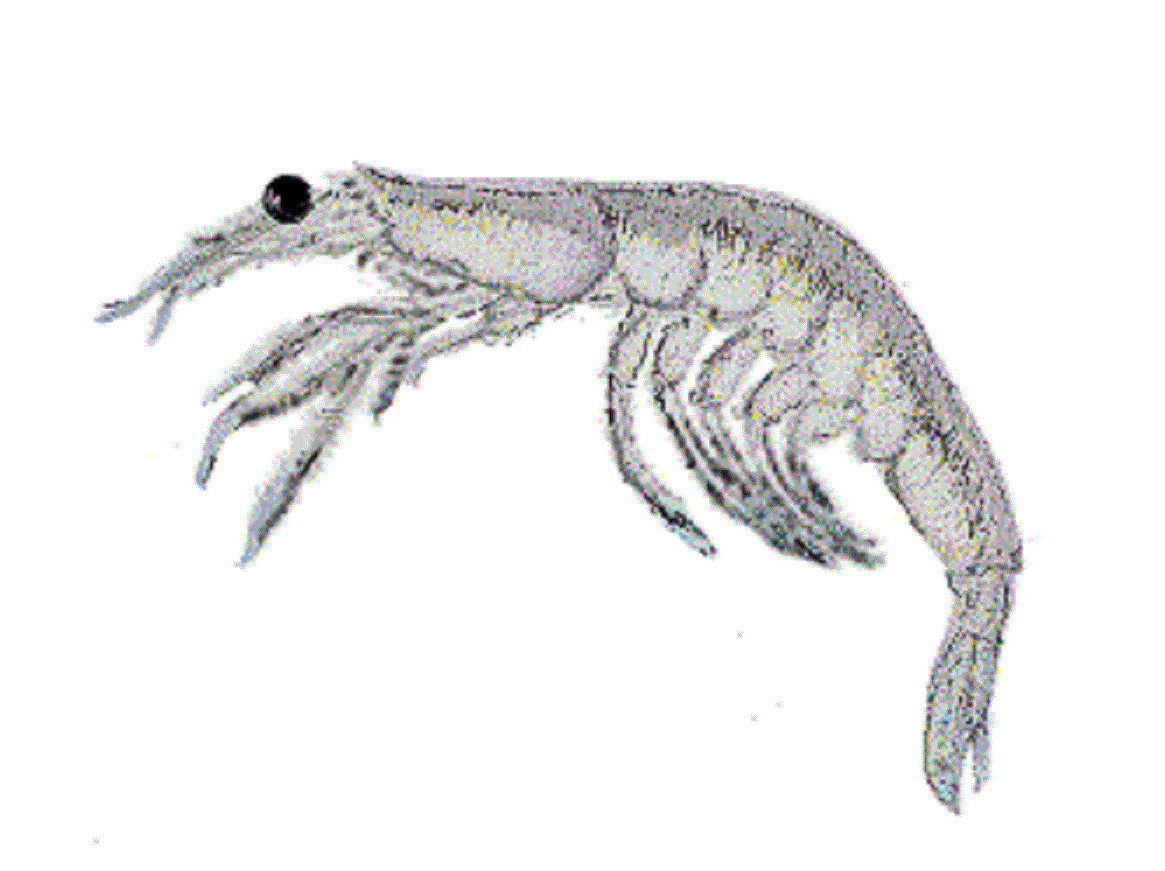
- Acetes sibogae

Scientific classification
- Kingdom: Animalia
- Phylum: Arthropoda
- Clade: Pancrustacea
- Class: Malacostraca
- Order: Decapoda
- Suborder: Dendrobranchiata
- Family: Sergestidae
- Genus: Acetes; H. Milne-Edwards, 1830

Type species
- Acetes indicus H. Milne-Edwards, 1830

= Acetes =

Genus of shrimp

Acetes is a genus of small prawns that resemble krill, which is native to the western and central Indo-Pacific, the Atlantic coast of the Americas, Pacific coast of South America and inland waters of South America. Although most are from marine or estuarine habitats, the South American A. paraguayensis is a fresh water species. Several of its species are important for the production of shrimp paste in Southeast Asia, including Acetes. japonicus, which is the world's most heavily fished species of wild shrimp or prawn in terms of total tonnage and represent the majority of non-human animals killed for food in terms of number of individuals. They are generally 3-4 cm long.

In Southeast Asia, Acetes have different local names depending on the country. It is known as ruốc in Vietnam, rebon in Indonesia, geragau in Malaysia, bubuk in Brunei, alamang in the Philippines, among others.

== Description ==
The genus is characterised by the loss of the fourth and fifth pairs of pereiopods. They are small prawns, 1–4 centimetres (0.39–1.57 in) long, translucent, but with a pair of black eyes, and a number of red spots of pigment on the uropods.

== Life cycle ==
The eggs of Acetes are green. As they develop, they swell to twice their original size or more. The eggs hatch early in the year, and the larvae grow, mature and spawn in the same year.

== Taxonomy ==
It includes 14 species, which are listed here with their FAO endorsed common names:

- Acetes americanus Ortmann, 1893 – aviu shrimp
- Acetes binghami Burkenroad, 1934
- Acetes chinensis Hansen, 1919 – northern mauxia shrimp
- Acetes erythraeus Nobili, 1905 – tsivakihini paste shrimp
- Acetes indicus H. Milne-Edwards, 1830 – Jawala paste shrimp
- Acetes intermedius Omori, 1975 – Taiwan mauxia shrimp
- Acetes japonicus Kishinouye, 1905 – akiami paste shrimp
- Acetes johni Nataraj, 1947
- Acetes marinus Omori, 1975
- Acetes natalensis Barnard, 1950
- Acetes paraguayensis Hansen, 1919

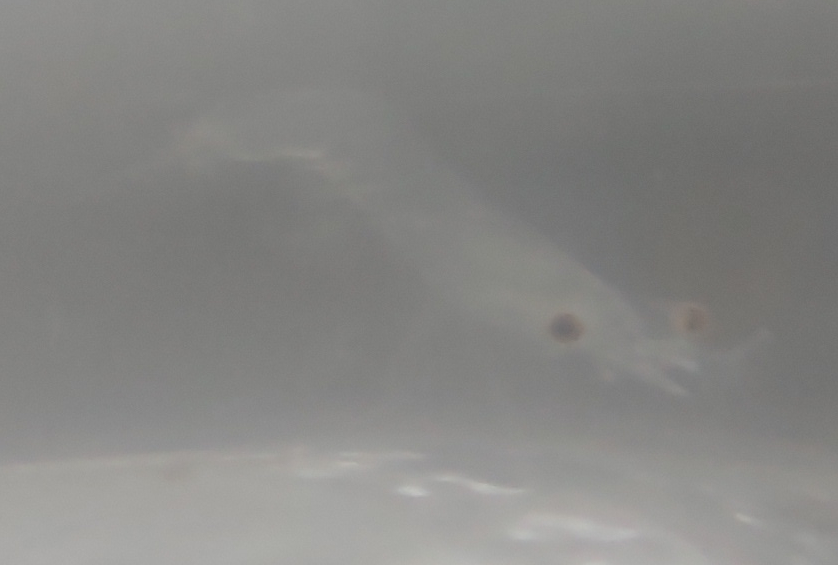
A. paraguayensis

- Acetes serrulatus (Krøyer, 1859) – southern mauxia shrimp
- Acetes sibogae Hansen, 1919 – alamang shrimp

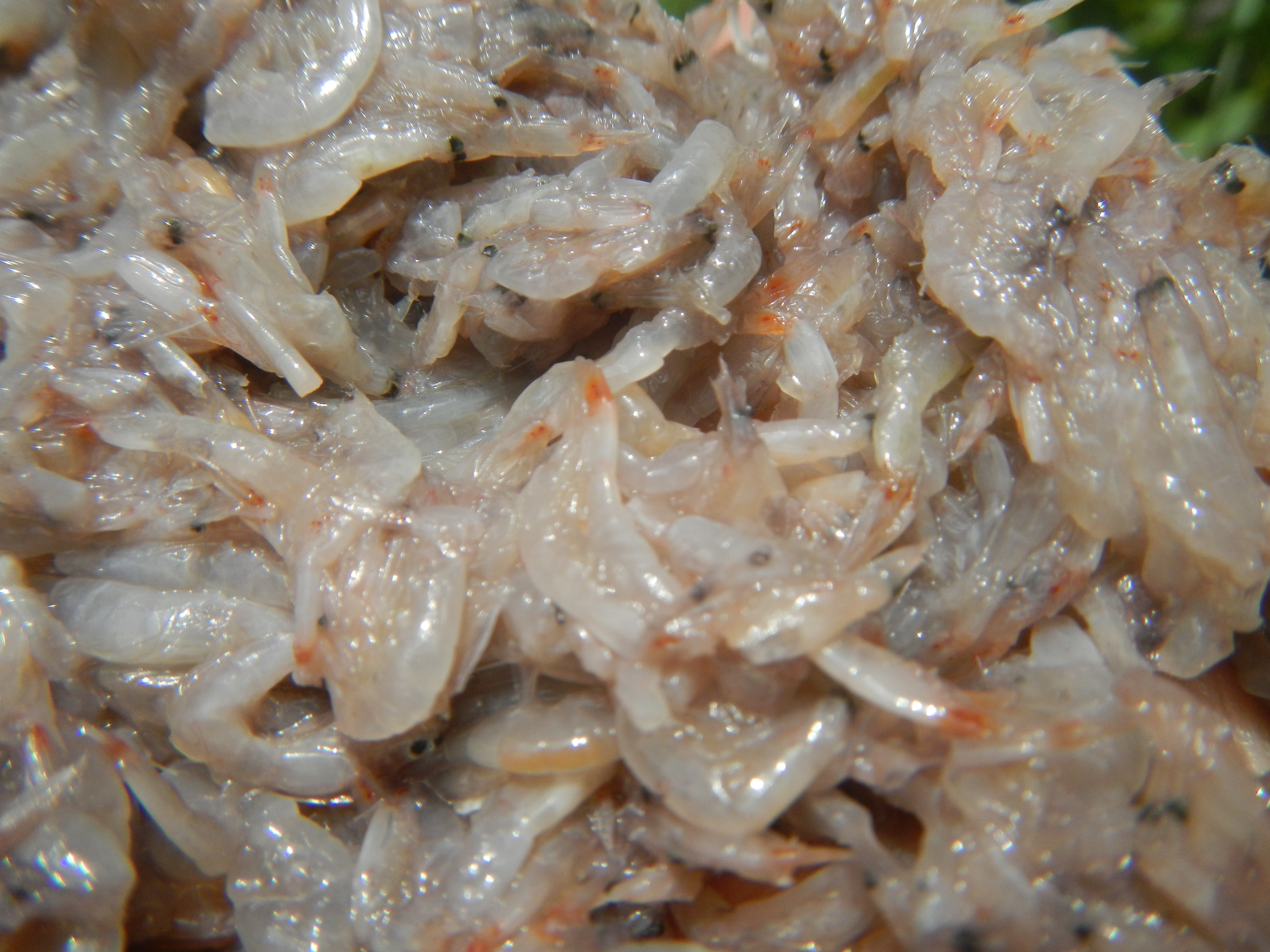
A. sibogae Alamang

- Acetes vulgaris Hansen, 1919 – jembret shrimp

== Fishery ==
Many species of Acetes are fished for commercially, and the different species are often not discriminated. Acetes are the most fished genus of crustacean, with global production in 2008 of 558,124 tonnes (1.23×10^{9} lb). Fishers mostly use push nets and bag nets, as well as seines both on boats and from the shore.

=== Preparation ===
Only a small proportion of the entire catch is sold fresh, with most of it being dried, salted or fermented. The caught prawns are washed and then mixed with 4–5 pounds (1.8–2.3 kg) of salt per 100 lb (45 kg) of prawns. The prawns are then crushed using cleavers and packed into various containers, where the paste remains for around 4 hours. After this, the paste is re-packed, before being left to mature for a month, after which it is mixed and crushed again, and then packed for sale. If a producer cannot sell the paste quickly, it can be kept for up to 6 months, mincing it every month or so. The resulting paste is reported to contain 16.2% protein and 1.3% fat.

== See also ==
- Shrimp fishery
- Shrimp paste
