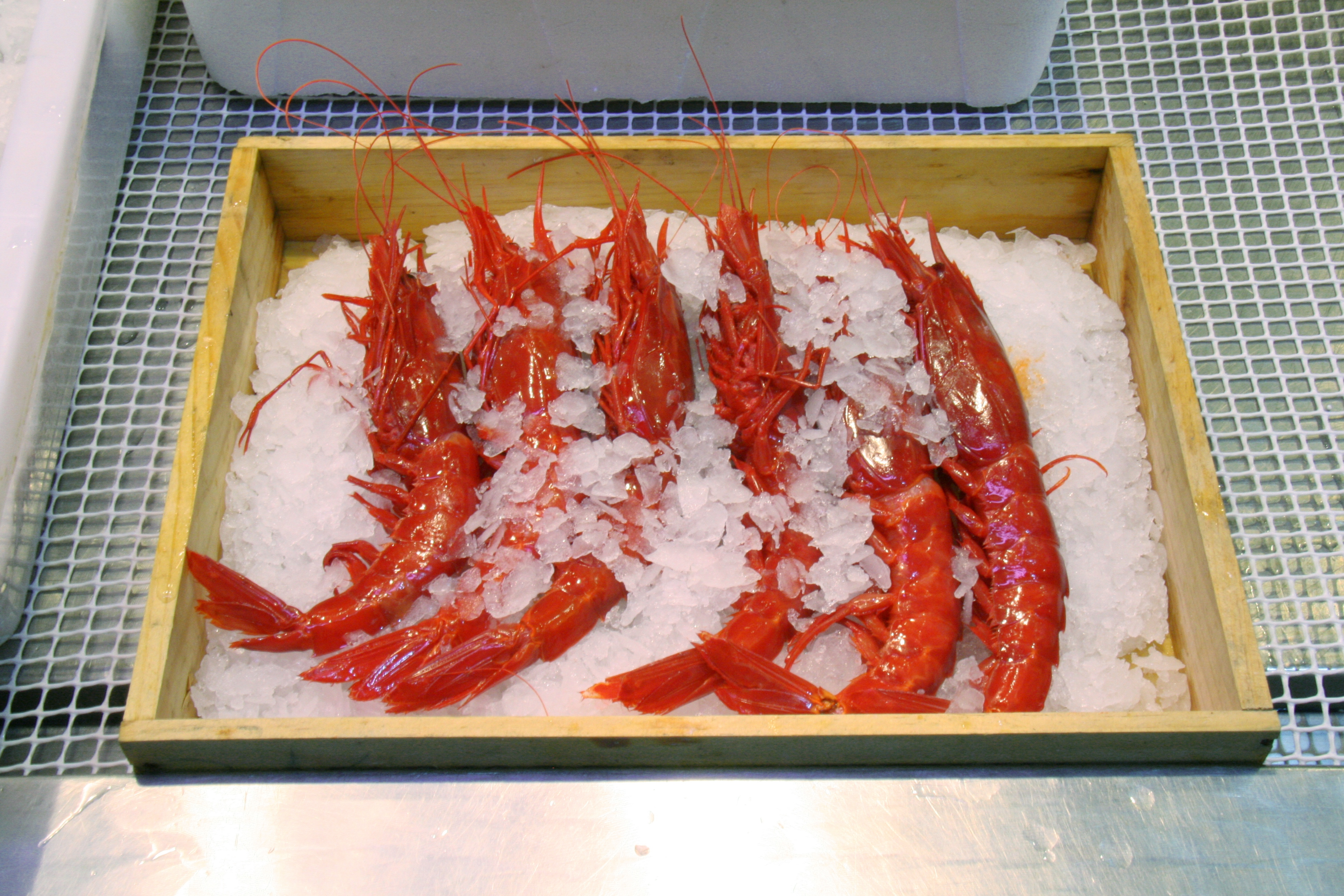

Scientific classification
- Kingdom: Animalia
- Phylum: Arthropoda
- Class: Malacostraca
- Order: Decapoda
- Suborder: Dendrobranchiata
- Family: Aristeidae
- Genus: Aristaeopsis; Wood-Mason, 1891
- Species: A. edwardsiana

Binomial name
- Aristaeopsis edwardsiana (Johnson, 1868)

Synonyms
- Aristaeopsis edwardsianus (Johnson, 1867); Aristeus coralinus Spence Bate, 1888; Aristeus splendens Richard, 1900; Penaeus edwardsianus Johnson, 1868; Plesiopenaeus edwardsianus (Johnson, 1868)

= Aristaeopsis =

Genus of crustaceans

Aristaeopsis is a monotypic genus of deepwater prawn. Its only species Aristaeopsis edwardsiana, commonly known as Carabineros shrimp or cardinal prawn, is the target of commercial fisheries. The scientific name honours Henri Milne-Edwards.
