= Aciculopoda =

Aciculopoda Temporal range: Famennian

Scientific classification
- Kingdom: Animalia
- Phylum: Arthropoda
- Class: Malacostraca
- Order: Decapoda
- Suborder: Dendrobranchiata
- Superfamily: Penaeoidea
- Family: †Aciculopodidae; Feldmann & Schweitzer, 2010
- Genus: †Aciculopoda; Feldmann & Schweitzer, 2010
- Species: †A. mapesi

Binomial name
- †Aciculopoda mapesi Feldmann & Schweitzer, 2010

Extinct genus of crustaceans

Aciculopoda is an extinct prawn which existed in what is now Oklahoma approximately 360 million years ago. It was described in 2010 on the basis of a single fossil from Oklahoma. The single species, Aciculopoda mapesi, was named by Rodney Feldmann and Carrie Schweitzer in honour of Royal Mapes, a paleontologist who discovered the type specimen. It is only the third unambiguous fossil decapod from before the Mesozoic.

== Discovery ==
The fossil was discovered in the Woodford Shale, exposed at the Ryan Quarry, in Pontotoc County, Oklahoma. The Woodford Shale is a dark-colored siliceous shale which outcrops to the north-east and the south-west of the Arbuckle Mountains in Oklahoma. It contains "radiolarians, conodonts, sponge spicules, ammonoid and nautiloid cephalopods, inarticulate brachiopods [...] and small phyllocarid arthropods", and spans the Devonian–Carboniferous boundary. The strata which produced Aciculopoda are thought on the basis of conodont biostratigraphy to be from the Famennian.

== Description ==
The holotype of Aciculopoda mapesi is housed at the United States National Museum as lot USNM 540766. The animal is 68.8 mm (2.71 in) long, of which the anterior 31 mm (1.2 in) is the cephalothorax. The pleon (abdomen) is around 62 mm (2.4 in) long, along its curved dorsal margin, and about 9 mm (0.35 in) deep at its base. The cuticle is missing from the pleon, exposing the well-preserved muscles beneath.

== Etymology ==
The genus name Aciculopoda is said to be derived from the Latin acicula ("needle") and "poda" ("foot"), referring to the sharp spines on the pereiopods. Pes is however used for "foot" in classical Latin,. while in ancient Greek, pous (πούς) is used. The specific epithet commemorates Royal Mapes, who discovered the specimen and has published widely on fossil crustaceans.

== Interpretation ==
The only unambiguous decapod fossil older than Aciculopoda is Palaeopalaemon newberryi, found in Devonian sediments in Ohio. (The assignment of Imocaris to the Decapoda is the subject of some debate.) The fact that both Aciculopoda and Palaeopalaemon were discovered in the United States led Feldmann & Schweitzer to suggest that their common ancestor, the most recent common ancestor of the Decapoda may also have originated in the ancient continent Laurentia.
