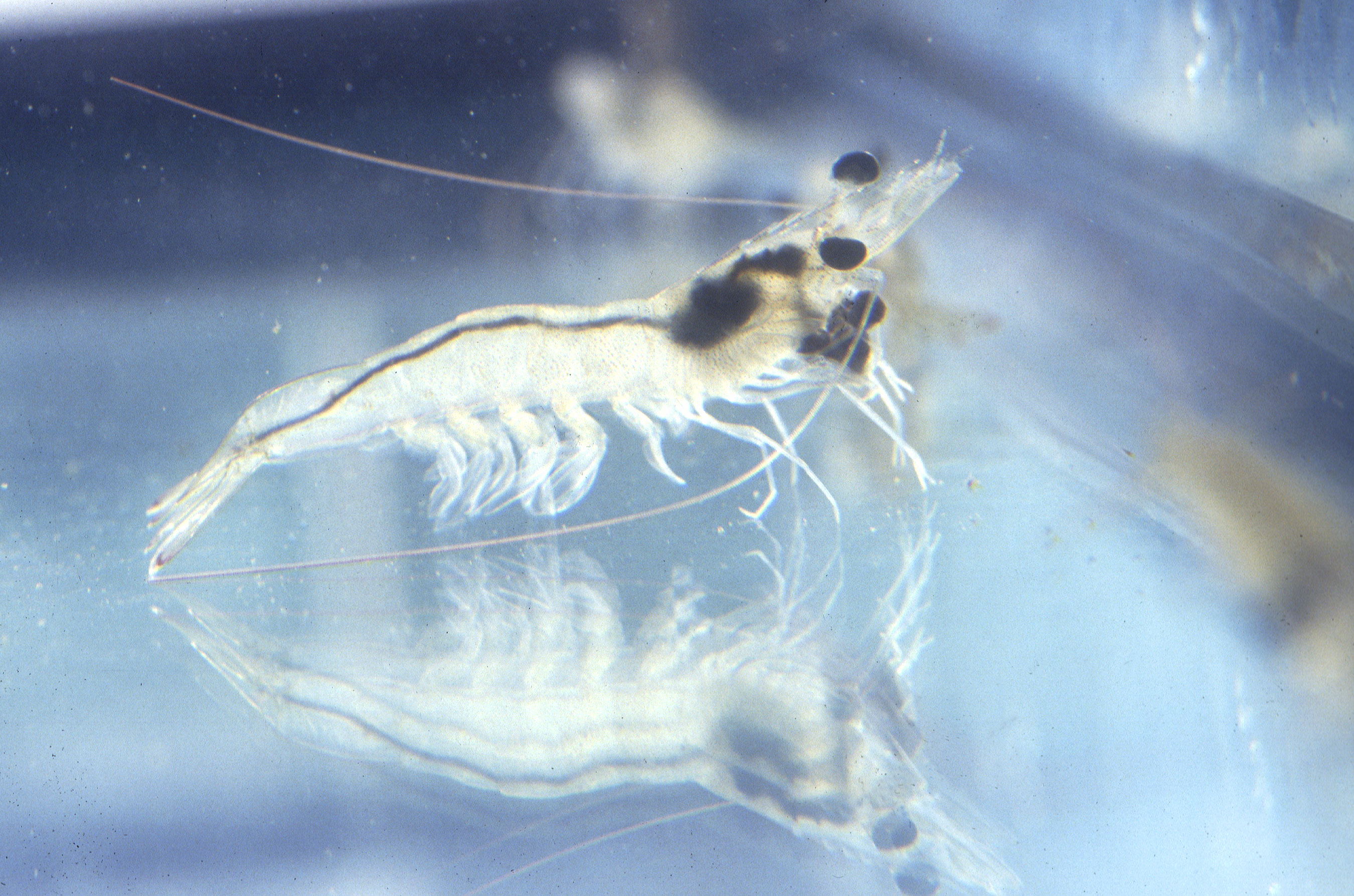
- Litopenaeus vannamei

Scientific classification
- Domain: Eukaryota
- Kingdom: Animalia
- Phylum: Arthropoda
- Class: Malacostraca
- Order: Decapoda
- Suborder: Dendrobranchiata
- Superfamily: Penaeoidea; Rafinesque, 1815

= Penaeoidea =

Penaeoidea Temporal range: Famennian–Recent

Superfamily of crustaceans

Penaeoidea is the larger of the two superfamilies of prawns. It comprises eight families, three of which are known only from fossils. The fossil record of the group stretches back to Aciculopoda, discovered in Famennian sediments in Oklahoma.

- † Aciculopodidae (1 genus, 1 species)
- † Aegeridae (2 genera, 25 species)
- Aristeidae (10 genera, 28 species)
- Benthesicymidae (5 genera, 43 species)
- † Carpopenaeidae (1 genus, 3 species)
- Penaeidae (48 genera, 286 species)
- Sicyoniidae (1 genus, 53 species)
- Solenoceridae (10 genera, 86 species)

== See also ==
- Sergestoidea
