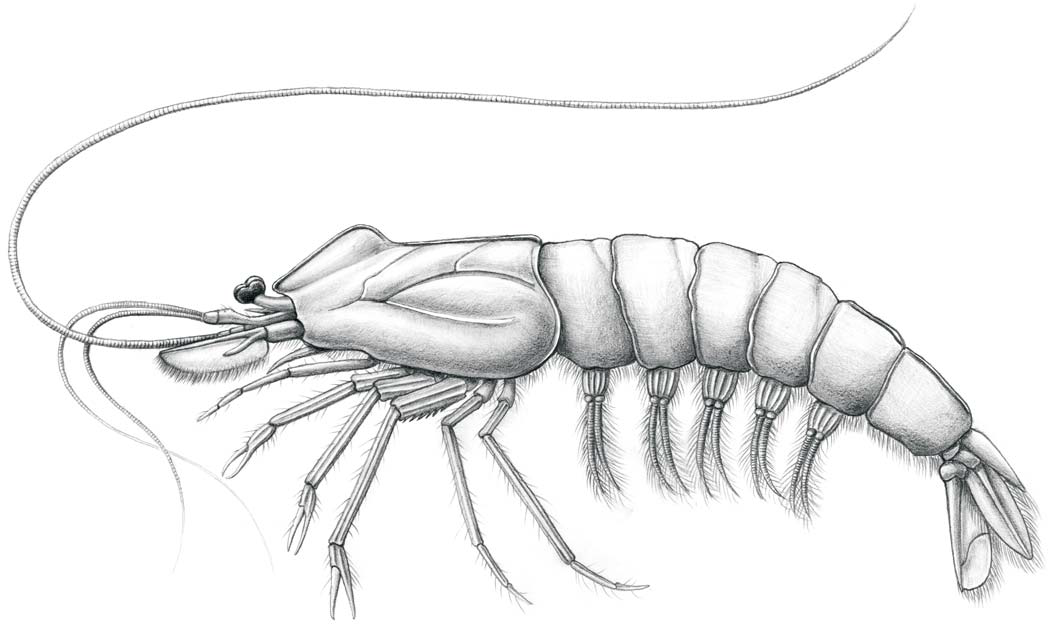

Scientific classification
- Kingdom: Animalia
- Phylum: Arthropoda
- Class: Malacostraca
- Order: Decapoda
- Suborder: Dendrobranchiata
- Family: Benthesicymidae
- Genus: †Palaeobenthesicymus; Audo & Charbonnier, 2013
- Species: †P. libanensis

Binomial name
- †Palaeobenthesicymus libanensis (Brocchi, 1875)

Synonyms
- Penaeus libanensis Brocchi, 1875; Benthesicymus libanensis (Brocchi, 1875)

= Palaeobenthesicymus =

Palaeobenthesicymus Temporal range: Santonian

Extinct genus of crustaceans

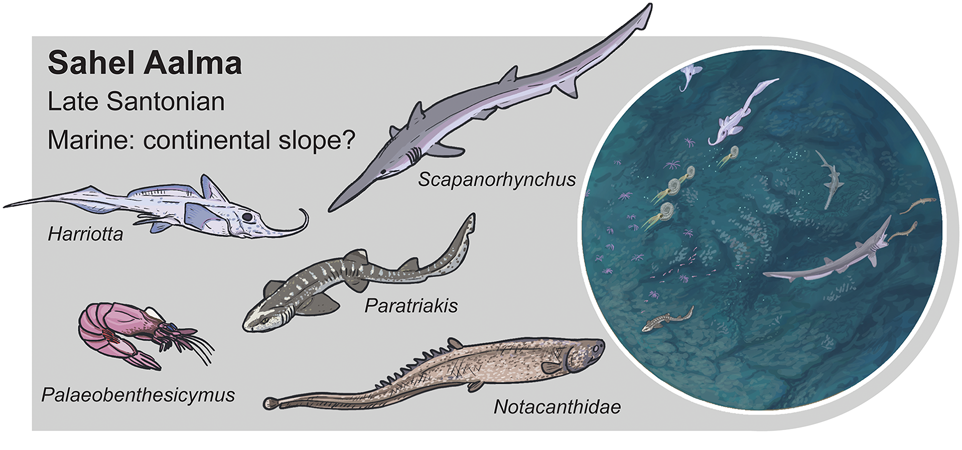
Fauna and depositional environment of the Sahel Alma locality, including Palaeobenthesicymus

Palaeobenthesicymus is an extinct genus of prawns which existed in what is now Lebanon in the Late Santonian. It was described by Denis Audo and Sylvain Charbonnier in 2013, as a new genus for the species Penaeus libanensis, first described by P. Brocchi in 1875.
