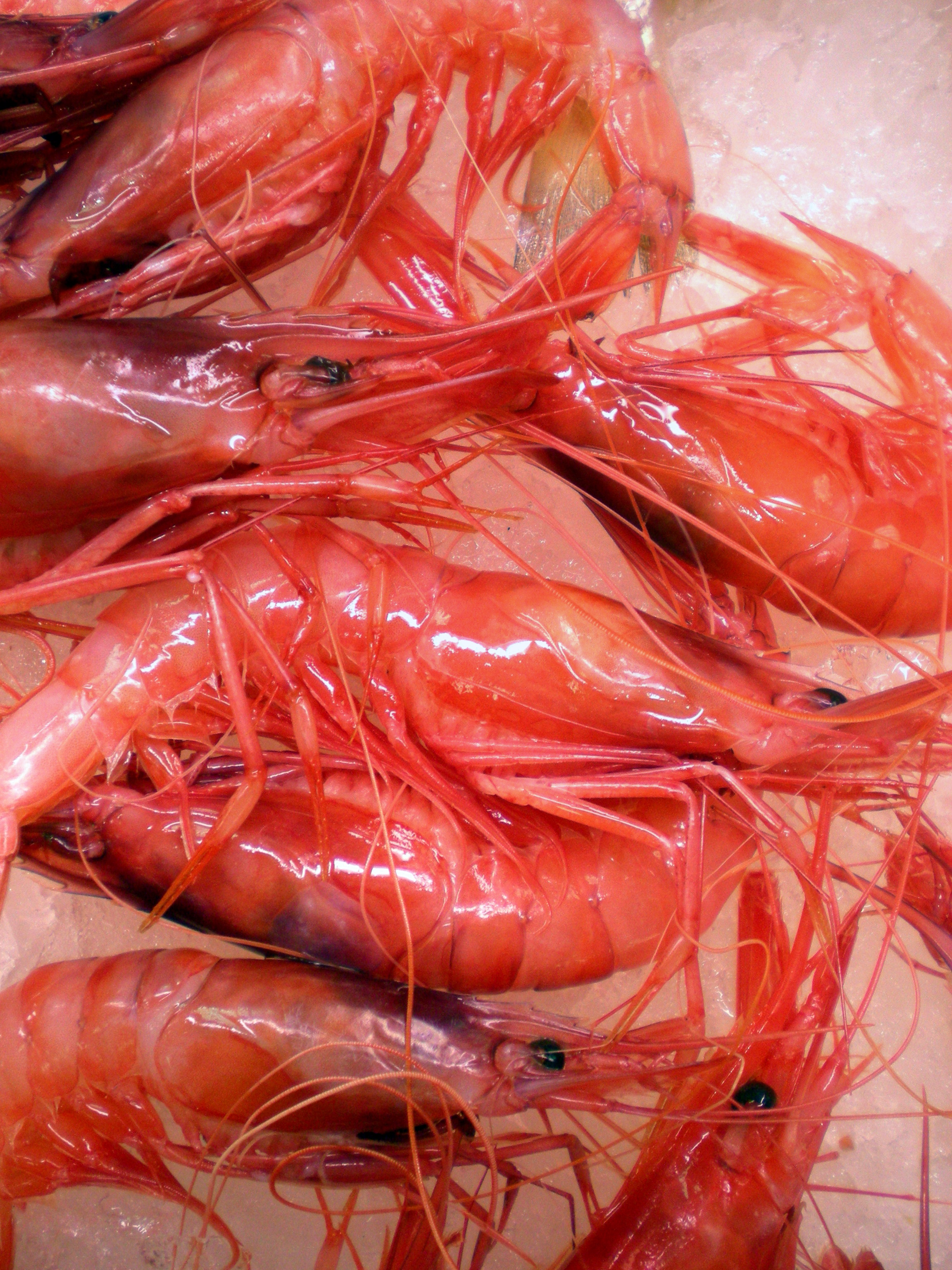
- Aristeus antennatus

Scientific classification
- Kingdom: Animalia
- Phylum: Arthropoda
- Clade: Pancrustacea
- Class: Malacostraca
- Order: Decapoda
- Suborder: Dendrobranchiata
- Superfamily: Penaeoidea
- Family: Aristeidae; Wood-Mason, 1891

Type genus
- Aristeus Duvernoy, 1840

= Aristeidae =

Family of crustaceans

Aristeidae is a family of Dendrobranchiata decapod crustaceans known as deep-sea shrimps, gamba prawns or gamba shrimps. Some species are subject to commercial fisheries.

== Genera ==
The following genera are classified under the Aristeidae:

- Aristaeomorpha Wood-Mason, 1891
- Aristaeopsis Wood-Mason, 1891
- Aristeus Duvernoy, 1840
- Austropenaeus Pérez Farfante & Kensley, 1997
- Cerataspis Gray, 1828
  - The worldwide distributed Cerataspis monstrosa Gray, 1828 (also Cerataspis armatus Spence Bate, 1881)) was proven in 2012 to be the larva stage of the adult described Plesiopenaeus armatus (Spence Bate, 1881)
- Hemipenaeus Spence Bate, 1881
- Hepomadus Spence Bate, 1881
- Parahepomadus Crosnier, 1978
- Pseudaristeus Crosnier, 1978
