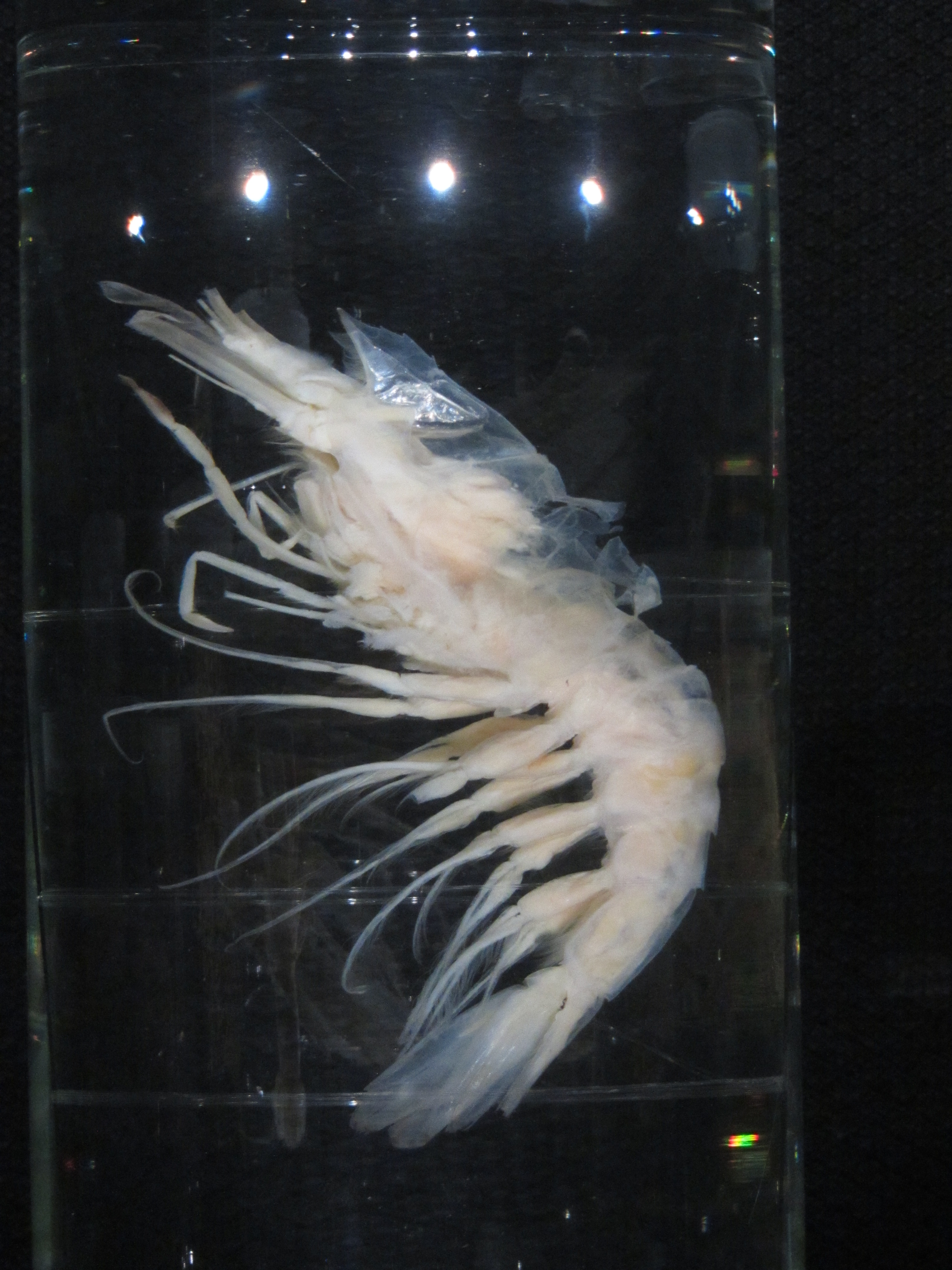
- Benthesicymus crenatus

Scientific classification
- Kingdom: Animalia
- Phylum: Arthropoda
- Class: Malacostraca
- Order: Decapoda
- Suborder: Dendrobranchiata
- Superfamily: Penaeoidea
- Family: Benthesicymidae; Wood-Mason in Wood-Mason & Alcock, 1891

Genera
- Altelatipes Crosnier & Vereshchaka, 2008; Bentheogennema Burkenroad, 1936; Benthesicymus Spence Bate, 1881; Benthonectes Smith, 1885; Gennadas Spence Bate, 1881; Palaeobenthesicymus; Bathicaris Vereshchaka & Kulagin, 2020; Dalicaris Vereshchaka & Kulagin, 2020; Maorrancaris Vereshchaka & Kulagin, 2020; Trichocaris Vereshchaka & Kulagin, 2020

= Benthesicymidae =

Family of crustaceans

Benthesicymidae is a family of pelagic and bathypelagic shrimps in the suborder Dendrobranchiata. Because they live in the deep ocean, these shrimp are difficult to collect, and much is still unknown about their ecology and evolution. Recent work by Vereshchaka & Lunina has clarified evolutionary relationships within the family. Evidence for fossil Benthesicymidae have been collected from the Late Santonian of Lebanon.
