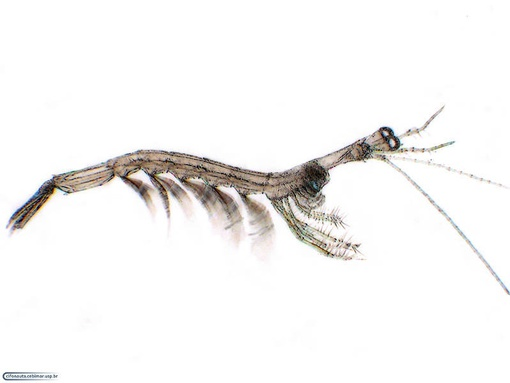

Scientific classification
- Domain: Eukaryota
- Kingdom: Animalia
- Phylum: Arthropoda
- Class: Malacostraca
- Order: Decapoda
- Suborder: Dendrobranchiata
- Superfamily: Sergestoidea; Dana, 1852

Families
- Luciferidae De Haan, 1849; Sergestidae Dana, 1852

= Sergestoidea =

Sergestoidea Temporal range: Bathonian–Recent

Superfamily of crustaceans

Sergestoidea is a superfamily of prawns, divided into two families – the Luciferidae and the Sergestidae.
