= Sergestidae =

Sergestidae Temporal range: Bathonian–Recent

Scientific classification
- Kingdom: Animalia
- Phylum: Arthropoda
- Clade: Pancrustacea
- Class: Malacostraca
- Order: Decapoda
- Suborder: Dendrobranchiata
- Superfamily: Sergestoidea
- Family: Sergestidae; Dana, 1852

Genera
- See text

Family of crustaceans

Sergestidae is a family of prawns which have lived since at least the Middle Jurassic (Bajocian/Bathonian of Monte Fallano Plattenkalk). It contains the following genera:

- Acetes H. Milne-Edwards, 1830
- Allosergestes Judkins & Kensley, 2008
- Challengerosergia Vereshchaka, Olesen & Lunina, 2014
- Cornutosergestes Vereshchaka, Olesen & Lunina, 2014
- Cretasergestes Garassino & Schweigert, 2006 †
- Deosergestes Judkins & Kensley, 2008
- Eusergestes Judkins & Kensley, 2008
- Gardinerosergia Vereshchaka, Olesen & Lunina, 2014
- Lucensosergia Vereshchaka, Olesen & Lunina, 2014
- Neosergestes Judkins & Kensley, 2008
- Paleomattea Maisey & G. P. de Carvalho, 1995 †
- Parasergestes Judkins & Kensley, 2008
- Peisos Burkenroad, 1945
- Petalidium Spence Bate, 1881
- Phorcosergia Vereshchaka, Olesen & Lunina, 2014
- Prehensilosergia Vereshchaka, Olesen & Lunina, 2014
- Robustosergia Vereshchaka, Olesen & Lunina, 2014
- Scintillosergia Vereshchaka, Olesen & Lunina, 2014
- Sergestes H. Milne-Edwards, 1830
- Sergia Stimpson, 1860
- Sicyonella Borradaile, 1910
