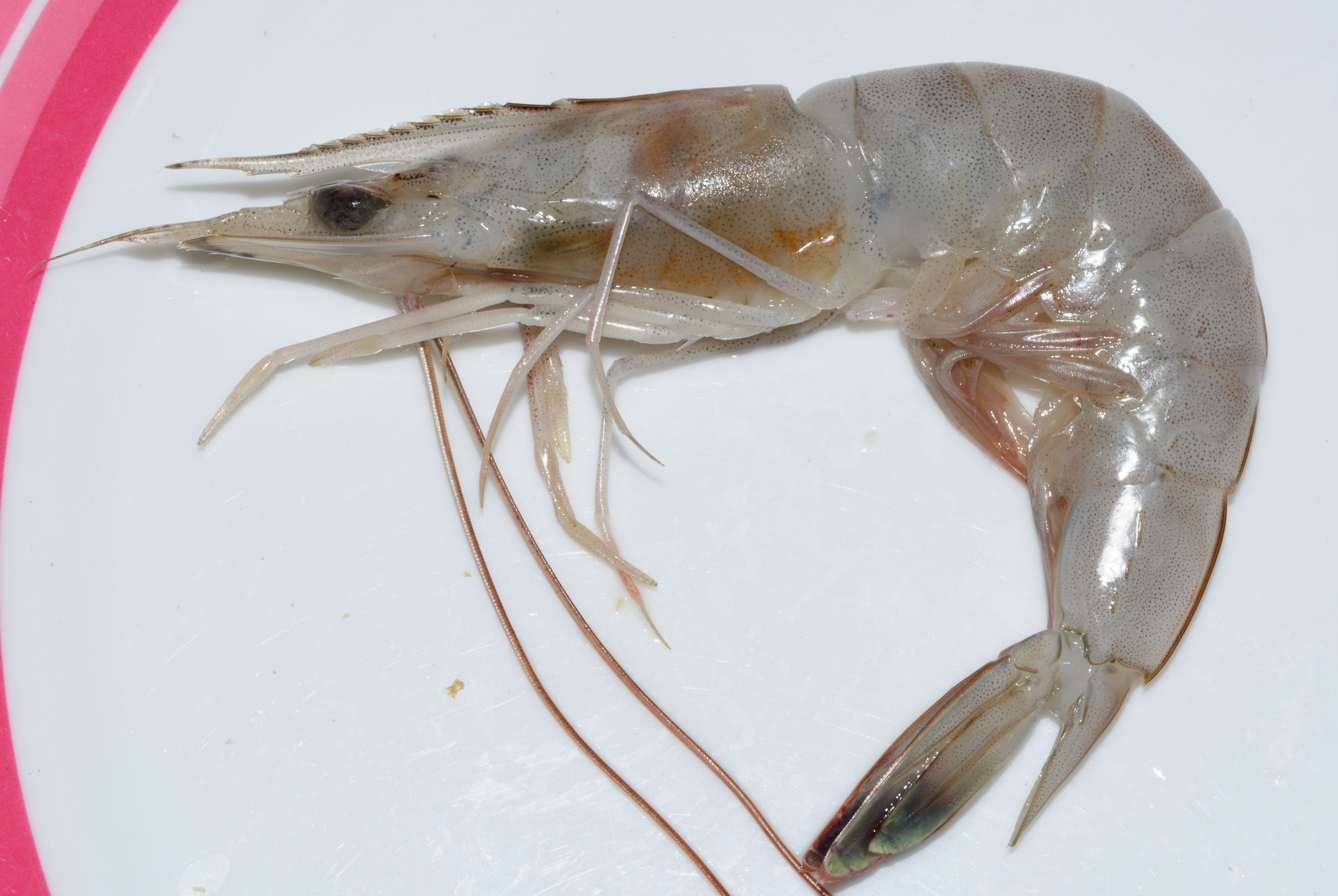
- Penaeus monodon

Scientific classification
- Kingdom: Animalia
- Phylum: Arthropoda
- Clade: Pancrustacea
- Class: Malacostraca
- Superorder: Eucarida
- Order: Decapoda
- Suborder: Dendrobranchiata; Bate, 1888

Superfamilies and families
- Penaeoidea Aciculopodidae † Aegeridae † Aristeidae Benthesicymidae Carpopenaeidae † Penaeidae Sicyoniidae Solenoceridae Sergestoidea Luciferidae Sergestidae

Synonyms
- Penaeidea Dana, 1852

= Dendrobranchiata =

Dendrobranchiata Temporal range: Famennian–Recent

Suborder of prawns

Dendrobranchiata is a suborder of decapods, commonly known as prawns (though this may be ambiguous). There are 540 extant species in seven families, and a fossil record extending back to the Devonian. They differ from related animals, such as Caridea and Stenopodidea, by the branching form of the gills (hence their scientific name Dendrobrachiata) and by the fact that they do not brood their eggs, but release them directly into the water. They may reach a length of over 330 millimetres (13 in) and a mass of 450 grams (1.0 lb), and are widely fished and farmed for human consumption.

== Nomenclature ==
While Dendrobranchiata and Caridea belong to different suborders of Decapoda, they are very similar in appearance, and in many contexts such as commercial farming and fisheries, they are both often referred to as "shrimp" and "prawn" interchangeably. In the United Kingdom, Australia and some other Commonwealth nations, the word "prawn" is used almost exclusively, while the opposite is the case in North America. The term "prawn" is also loosely used to describe any large shrimp, especially those that come 15 (or fewer) to the pound (such as "king prawns", yet sometimes known as "jumbo shrimp").

Due to their superficial similarity, Dendrobranchiata and Caridea were historically grouped together, though it is currently understood that they are distantly related. The classification of these groups is explained below.

== Description ==
Together with other swimming Decapoda, Dendrobranchiata show the "caridoid facies", or shrimp-like form. The body is typically robust, and can be divided into a cephalothorax (fusion of the head or cephalon and thorax) and a pleon (abdomen). The body is generally slightly flattened side-to-side. The largest species, Penaeus monodon, can reach a mass of 450 grams (16 oz) and a length of 336 millimetres (13.2 in).

=== Head ===
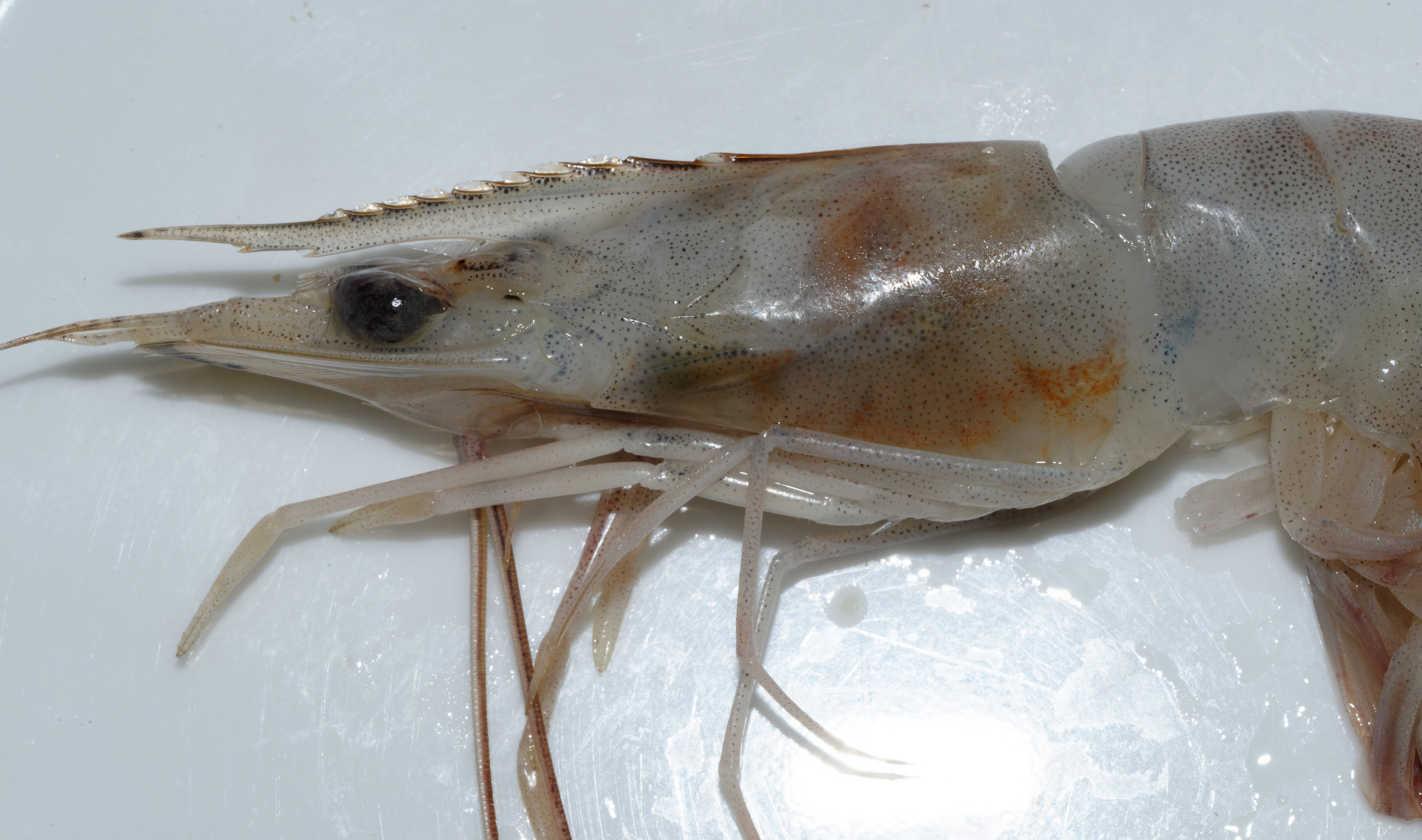
Head

The most conspicuous appendages arising from the head are the antennae; the first pair are biramous (having two flagella), except in Luciferidae, and are relatively small. The second pair can be 2–3 times the length of the body and are always uniramous (having a single flagellum). The mouthparts comprise pairs of mandibles, maxillules and maxillae, arising from the head, and three pairs of maxillipeds, arising from the thorax. A pair of stalked eyes points forwards from the head.

=== Thorax ===
The carapace originates from the thorax to cover the cephalothorax, and extends forwards between the eyes into a rostrum. This is only as long as the stalked eyes in Benthesicymidae, Luciferidae and Sergestidae, but considerably longer in Aristeidae.

As well as the three pairs of maxillipeds, the thorax also bears five pairs of pereiopods, or walking legs; the first three of these end in small chelae (pincers). The last two pereiopods are absent in Luciferidae and Acetes, but much longer than the preceding pereiopods in Hymenopenaeus and Xiphopenaeus.

The thoracic appendages carry gills, which are protected beneath the carapace. The gills are typically branched, and so resemble trees, lending the group its scientific name, Dendrobranchiata, from the Greek words δένδρον (dendron, tree) and βράγχια (branchia, gills).

=== Pleon ===
The pleon, or abdomen, is similar in length to the cephalothorax. It has six segments, the first five bearing lamellar pleopods, and the last one bearing uropods. The pleopods are biramous, except in Sicyoniidae, where they are uniramous. The uropods and telson collectively form the tail fan; the uropods are not divided by a diaeresis, as they are in many other decapods. The telson is pointed and is usually armed with four pairs of setae or spines.

=== Internal anatomy ===
Most of the musculature of a prawn is used for bending the pleon, and almost all the space in the pleon is filled by muscle. More than 17 muscles operate each of the pleopods, and a further 16 power the tail fan in the rapid backward movement of the caridoid escape reaction. These muscles, collectively, are the meat for which prawns are commercially fished and farmed.

The nervous system of prawns comprises a dorsal brain, and a ventral nerve cord, connected by two commissures around the oesophagus. The chief sensory inputs are visual input from the eyes, chemoreceptors on the antennae and in the mouth, and mechanoreceptors on the antennae and elsewhere.

The digestive system comprises a foregut, a midgut and a hindgut, and is situated dorsally. The foregut begins at the mouth, passes through the oesophagus, and opens into a sac that contains the grinding apparatus of the gastric mill. The hepatopancreas feeds into the midgut, where digestive enzymes are released, and nutrients taken up. The hindgut forms faecal pellets, which are then passed out through the muscular anus.

The circulatory system is based around a compact, triangular heart, which pumps blood into three main arteries. Excretion is carried out through the gills, and by specialised glands located at the base of the antennae, and is mostly in the form of ammonia.

== Life cycle ==
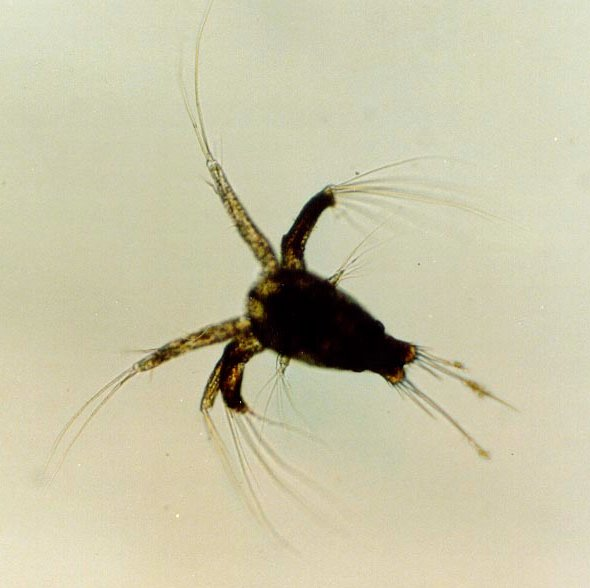
Nauplius of an unidentified prawn from the family Penaeidae

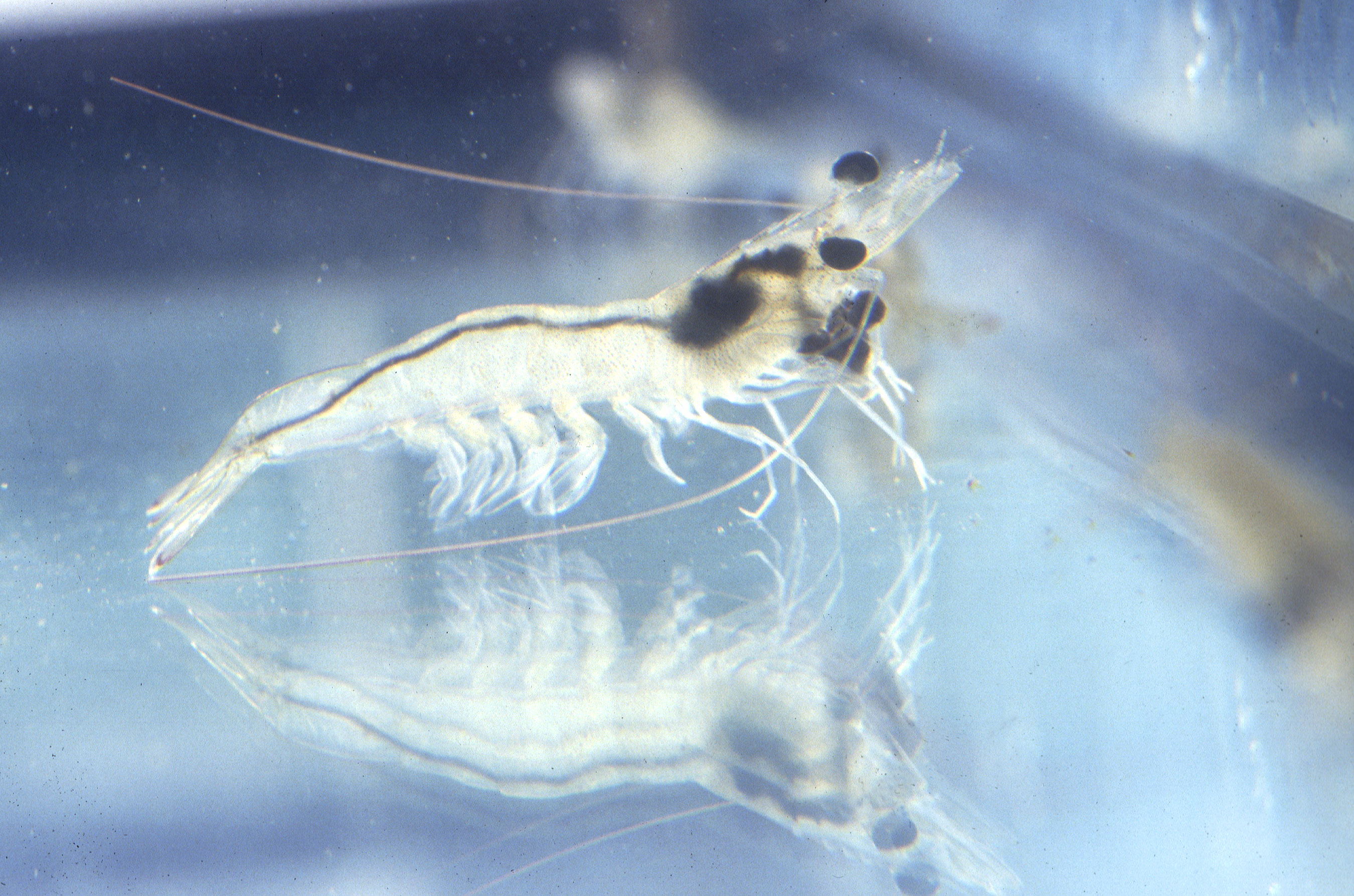
A juvenile Litopenaeus vannamei (whiteleg prawn)

Prawns may be divided into two groups based on the structure of the female genitalia, known as thelycum: those with an open thelycum and those with a closed thelycum. In the open-thelycum species, mating takes place towards the end of the moulting cycle, and usually at sunset. In closed-thelycum species, mating takes place shortly after moulting, when the exoskeleton is still soft, and usually occurs in the night. Courtship and mating may take up to 3 hours in Penaeus monodon, while in Farfantepenaeus paulensis, mating lasts just 4–5 seconds. Spawning may occur several times during the moulting cycle, and usually occurs at night.

With the exception of Luciferidae, the eggs of prawns are shed directly into the water, rather than being brooded. The eggs hatch into nauplius larvae, which are followed by zoea larvae (initially protozoea, and later mysis) and then a postlarva, before reaching adulthood. The changes between moults are gradual, and so the development is anamorphic rather than metamorphic.

Uniquely among the Decapoda, the nauplii of Dendrobranchiata are free-swimming. There are five to eight naupliar stages. The earlier stages have three pairs of appendages that are used for locomotion – two pairs of antennae and the mandibles. Later stages also have rudiments of other mouthparts, but the nauplius is unable to feed, and only lasts 24 to 68 hours. The body ends at a two-lobed telson, and the beginnings of a carapace emerge at this stage.

There are typically five or six zoea stages in Dendrobranchiata, divided into protozoea and mysis. In the protozoea larvae, the antennae are still used for locomotion, but the mandibles become specialised for mastication. All the thoracic somites (body segments) have formed, and a carapace is present, covering part of the thorax. It is smooth in the family Penaeidae, but bears many spines in the family Solenoceridae. The pleon (abdomen) is unsegmented in the first protozoea, and ends in a bilobed telson, which may be used for cleaning other appendages, or for steering. By the second protozoea, segmentation appears on the pleon, and by the third protozoea, which may also be called the metazoea, the uropods have appeared.

By the mysis stages, the pereiopods (thoracic appendages) start to be used instead of the antennae for locomotion. The larva swims backwards, with its tail upwards, spinning slowly as it goes. The carapace covers most of the segments of the thorax, and claws appear on the first three pereiopods. By the last mysis stage, the beginnings of pleopods have appeared on the first five segments of the abdomen.

The post-larva or juvenile stage is characterised by the use of the pleopods for locomotion. The claws become functional, but the gills are still rudimentary. The telson is narrower and only retains traces of its two-lobed development. Through a series of gradual changes over following moults, the animal takes on its adult form.

== Systematics ==
Dendrobranchiata were traditionally grouped together with Caridean shrimp as "Natantia" (the swimming decapoda), as opposed to the Reptantia (the walking decapods). In 1888, Charles Spence Bate recognised the differences in gill morphology, and separated Natantia into Dendrobranchiata, Phyllobranchiata and Trichobranchiata. Recent analyses using cladistics and molecular phylogenetics recognise Dendrobranchiata as the sister group to all other Decapoda, collectively called Pleocyemata.

The cladogram below shows Dendrobranchiata's placement within the larger order Decapoda, from analysis by Wolfe et al., 2019.

- Decapoda
  - - Dendrobranchiata (prawns)
  - Pleocyemata
    - - Stenopodidea (boxer shrimp)
      - - Procarididea
        - Caridea ("true" shrimp)
    - Reptantia (crawling / walking decapods)
      - - Achelata (spiny lobsters and slipper lobsters)
        - - Polychelida (benthic crustaceans)
          - Glypheidea (glypheoid lobsters)
          - Astacidea (lobsters and crayfish)
      - - Axiidea (mud shrimp, ghost shrimp, and burrowing shrimp)
        - - Gebiidea (mud lobsters and mud shrimp)
          - - Anomura (hermit crabs and allies)
            - Brachyura ("true" crabs)

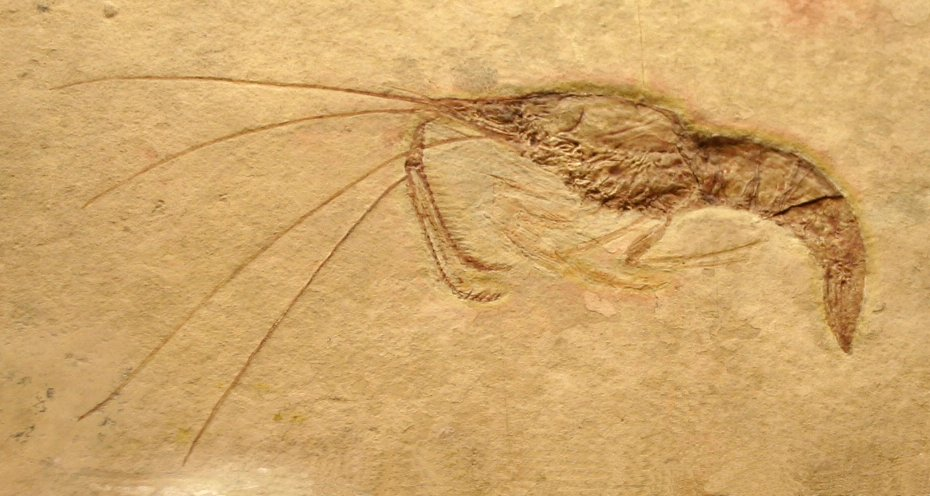
Fossil Aeger (Aegeridae)

Before 2010, the earliest known fossil prawns come from rocks in Madagascar of Permo-Triassic age, 250 million years ago. In 2010, however, the discovery of Aciculopoda from Famennian–stage rocks in Oklahoma extended the group's fossil record back to 360 million years ago. The best known fossil prawns are from the Jurassic Solnhofen limestones from Germany.

Living prawns are divided among seven families, five in the superfamily Penaeoidea, and two in the Sergestoidea, although molecular evidence disagrees with some aspects of the current classifications. Collectively, these include 540 extant species, and nearly 100 exclusively fossil species. A further two families are known only from fossils.

The cladogram below shows Dendrobranchiata's internal relationships of extant families (excluding Solenoceridae):

- Dendrobranchiata
  - Sergestoidea
    - Luciferidae
    - Sergestidae
  - Penaeoidea
    - - Sicyoniidae
      - Penaeidae
    - - Benthesicymidae
      - Aristeidae

=== Diversity ===
Dendrobranchiata comprises the following superfamilies and families:

Superfamily Penaeoidea Rafinesque-Schmaltz, 1815

† Aciculopodidae Feldmann & Schweitzer, 2010 – a single Famennian species, Aciculopoda mapesi
† Aegeridae Burkenroad, 1963 – two Mesozoic genera: Aeger and Acanthochirana
Aristeidae Wood-Mason, 1891 – 26 extant species in 9 genera, and one fossil genus
Benthesicymidae Wood-Mason, 1891 – 41 species in 4 genera
† Carpopenaeidae Garassino, 1994 – two Cretaceous species of Carpopenaeus
Penaeidae Rafinesque-Schmaltz, 1815 – 216 extant species in 26 genera, and several extinct genera, mostly Mesozoic
Sicyoniidae Ortmann, 1898 – 43 species of Sicyonia
Solenoceridae Wood-Mason, 1891 – 81 species in 9 genera

Superfamily Sergestoidea Dana, 1852

Luciferidae De Haan, 1849 – 7 species in 2 genera
Sergestidae Dana, 1852 – 90 extant species in six genera, and two extinct monotypic genera

== Distribution ==
The biodiversity of Dendrobranchiata decreases markedly at increasing latitudes; most species are only found in a region between 40° north and 40° south. Some species may occur at higher latitudes. For instance, Bentheogennema borealis is abundant at 57° north in the Pacific Ocean, while collections of Gennadas kempi have been made as far south as 61° south in the Antarctic Ocean.

== Ecology and behaviour ==
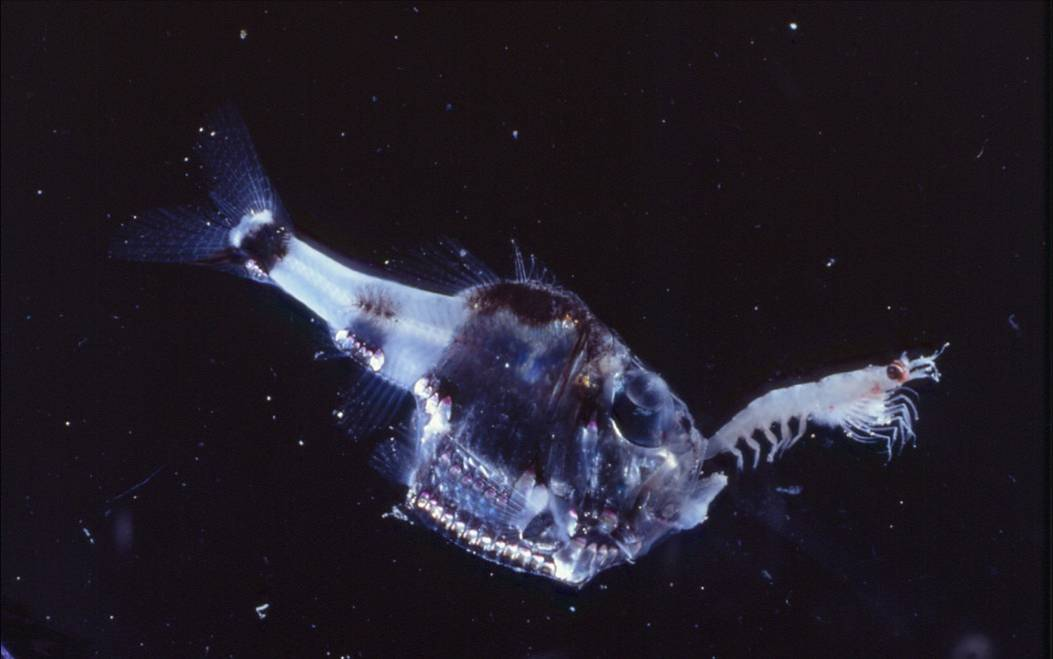
Fish, such as this Argyropelecus hemigymnus, are important predators of juvenile prawns, such as this Sicyonia.

There is a great deal of ecological variation within the suborder Dendrobranchiata. Some species of Sergestidae live in fresh water, but most prawns are exclusively marine. Species of Sergestidae and Benthesicymidae mostly live in deep water, and Solenoceridae species live offshore, while most Penaeidae species live in shallow inshore waters, and Lucifer is planktonic. Some species burrow in mud on the sea floor during the day and emerge at night to feed.

Prawns are "opportunistic omnivores", and their diet can include a range of food items from fine particles to large organisms. These may include fish, chaetognaths, krill, copepods, radiolarians, phytoplankton, nematocysts, ostracods and detritus. Prawns eat less around the time of ecdysis (moulting), probably because of the softness of the mouthparts, and must eat more than usual to compensate, once ecdysis is complete.

Prawns are an attractive food for predators, with a higher energy content than most other invertebrates. The larvae are prey to comb jellies, jellyfish, chaetognaths, fish and other crustaceans (such as mantis shrimp and crabs), and only a tiny proportion survive. Juveniles are targeted by a number of fish, cephalopods and birds; Litopenaeus vannamei juveniles experience 90% mortality in the 6–12 weeks they spend in Mexican lagoons, and this is thought to be due almost entirely to predation. Adult prawns are less susceptible to predation, but can fall prey to some fish.

== Economic importance ==
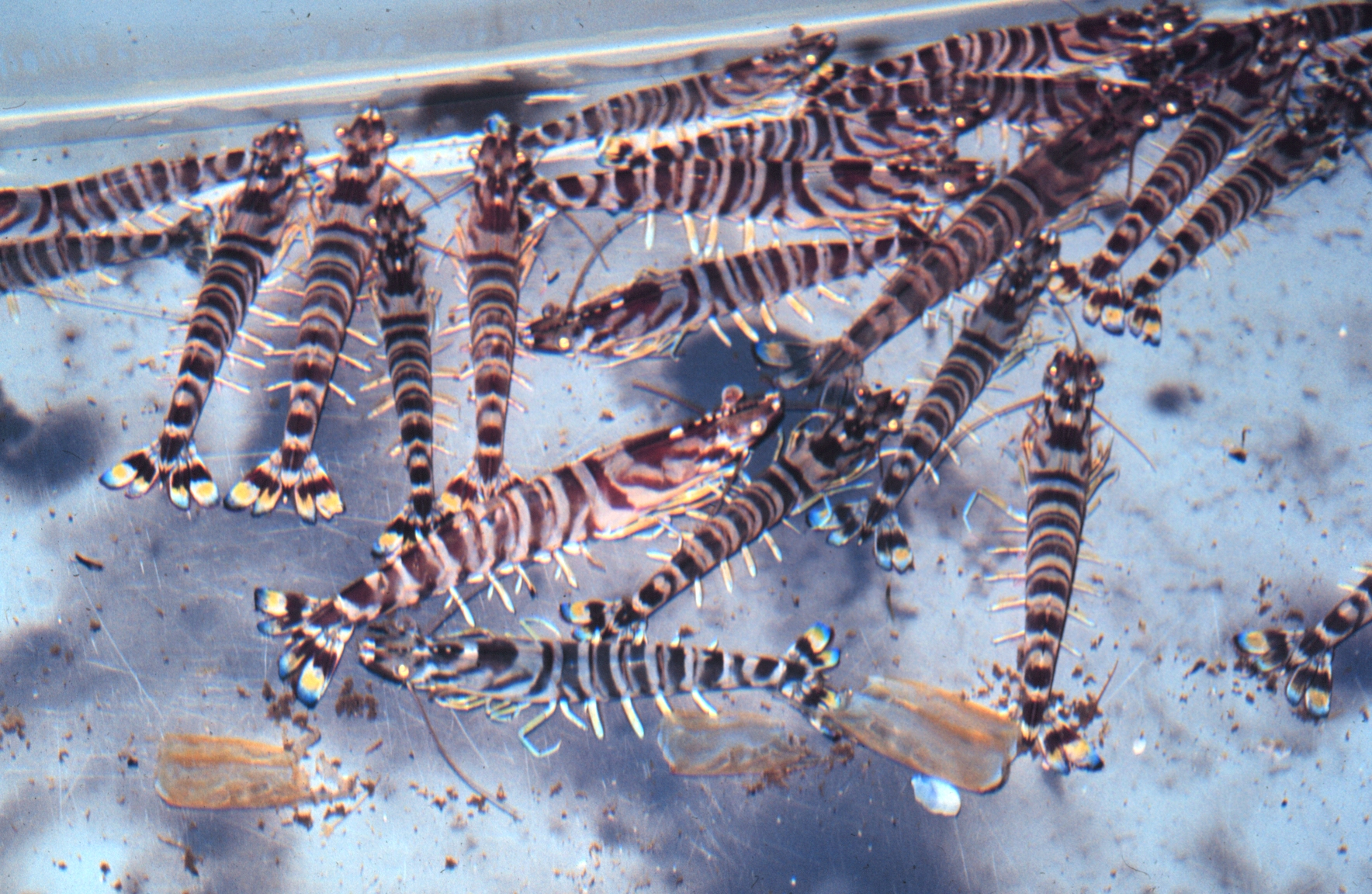
Marsupenaeus japonicus (Kuruma prawn) in an aquaculture facility in Taiwan

Dendrobranchiata are of huge economic importance. While in some countries, such as the United States, production is almost entirely through fisheries, other countries have concentrated on aquaculture (shrimp farms), including Ecuador where 95% of production is farmed; some countries produce similar amounts from fisheries and aquaculture, including Mexico, China, India and Indonesia.

Species from the family Aristeidae are important to deep-water fisheries, particularly in the Mediterranean Sea, where Aristaeomorpha foliacea is caught by trawlers. In Brazil, Aristaeomorpha foliacea, Aristaeopsis edwardsiana and Aristeus antillensis are of commercial importance. The shallow-water Penaeidae are of greater importance, however, and the most important species for fisheries is Fenneropenaeus chinensis, with a catch in 2005 of over 100,000 tons.

The most important species for aquaculture are Marsupenaeus japonicus (Kuruma prawn), Fenneropenaeus chinensis (Chinese prawn), Penaeus monodon (giant tiger prawn) and Litopenaeus vannamei (whiteleg prawn).
