= Hymenopenaeus doris =

Scientific classification
- Kingdom: Animalia
- Phylum: Arthropoda
- Clade: Pancrustacea
- Class: Malacostraca
- Order: Decapoda
- Suborder: Dendrobranchiata
- Family: Solenoceridae
- Genus: Hymenopenaeus
- Species: H. doris

Binomial name
- Hymenopenaeus doris Faxon, 1893

Species of crustacean

Hymenopenaeus doris, the zombie shrimp, is a species of prawn in the family Solenoceridae. The species lives in the Eastern Pacific in areas like Mexico, Peru, and Costa Rica, from depths of 549 to 4802 meters.

The defense mechanism of H. doris is to play dead in order to avoid predation; drifting motionless while playing dead, having the name "zombie shrimp". This might also be a way of saving energy, since the depth they live at disallows animals to swim rapidly for long periods of time due to the little oxygen.
