= Solenocera alfonso =

Scientific classification
- Domain: Eukaryota
- Kingdom: Animalia
- Phylum: Arthropoda
- Class: Malacostraca
- Order: Decapoda
- Suborder: Dendrobranchiata
- Family: Solenoceridae
- Genus: Solenocera
- Species: S. alfonso

Binomial name
- Solenocera alfonso Pérez Farfante, 1981

Species of crustacean

Solenocera alfonso is a species of decapod within the family Solenoceridae. The species is found in the eastern Indian Ocean and western central Pacific Ocean near countries such as the Philippines, Indonesia, and Australia at depths of 176 to 547 meters near benthic environments. It grows to lengths of 4 to 12 centimeters.
