= Hymenopenaeus fallax =

Scientific classification
- Domain: Eukaryota
- Kingdom: Animalia
- Phylum: Arthropoda
- Class: Malacostraca
- Order: Decapoda
- Suborder: Dendrobranchiata
- Family: Solenoceridae
- Genus: Hymenopenaeus
- Species: H. fallax

Binomial name
- Hymenopenaeus fallax Crosnier & Dall, 2004

Species of crustacean

Hymenopenaeus fallax is a species of prawn within the family Solenoceridae. The species is found distributed near the Hawaiian Islands at depths of 617 to 1937 meters. Females can grow up to 104 millimeters. Its species name fallax was given due to it often being confused H. obliquirostris.
