= Solenocera hextii =

Scientific classification
- Kingdom: Animalia
- Phylum: Arthropoda
- Clade: Pancrustacea
- Class: Malacostraca
- Order: Decapoda
- Suborder: Dendrobranchiata
- Family: Solenoceridae
- Genus: Solenocera
- Species: S. hextii

Binomial name
- Solenocera hextii Wood-Mason & Alcock, 1891

Species of crustacean

Solenocera hextii, the deep-sea mud shrimp, is a species of decapod within the family Solenoceridae. The species is found distributed in the Gulf of Aden, Arabian Sea and in the Bay of Bengal along the coasts of Yemen, Oman, Pakistan, India and Sri Lanka at depths of 120 to 505 meters. It is usually caught by deep sea trawlers at depths of 150 to 200 meters during January to March. Males grow to 5.5 centimeters whereas females can grow up to 13.8 centimeters in length. The species spawns from November to April, with the a peak in breeding occurring in January to February.
