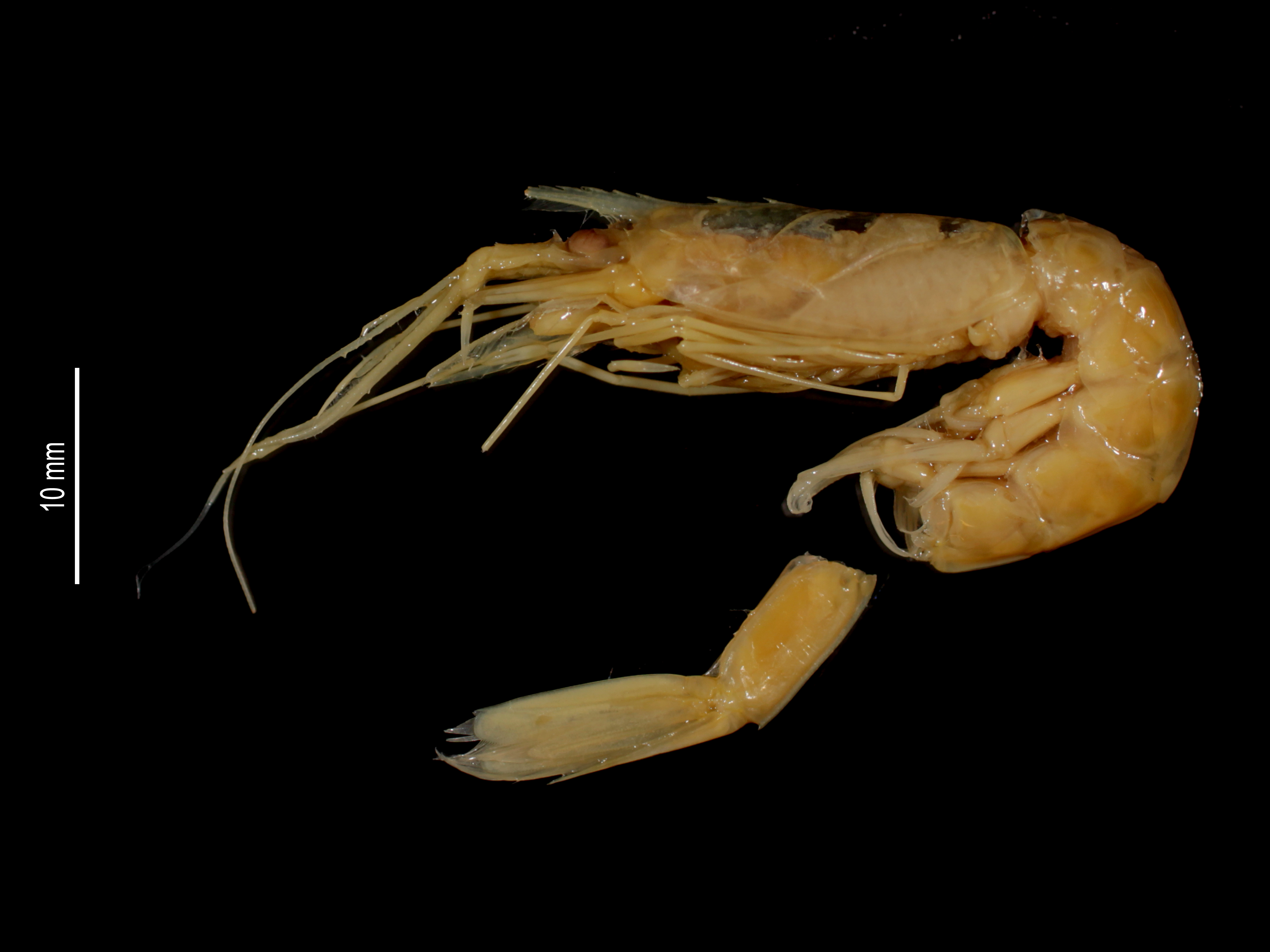

Scientific classification
- Domain: Eukaryota
- Kingdom: Animalia
- Phylum: Arthropoda
- Class: Malacostraca
- Order: Decapoda
- Suborder: Dendrobranchiata
- Family: Solenoceridae
- Genus: Hymenopenaeus
- Species: H. furici

Binomial name
- Hymenopenaeus furici Crosnier, 1978

= Hymenopenaeus furici =

Species of prawn

Hymenopenaeus furici is a species of prawn in the family Solenoceridae. They live in the Western Indian Ocean near Madagascar, at a depth ranging from 1000 to 1525 meters deep.
