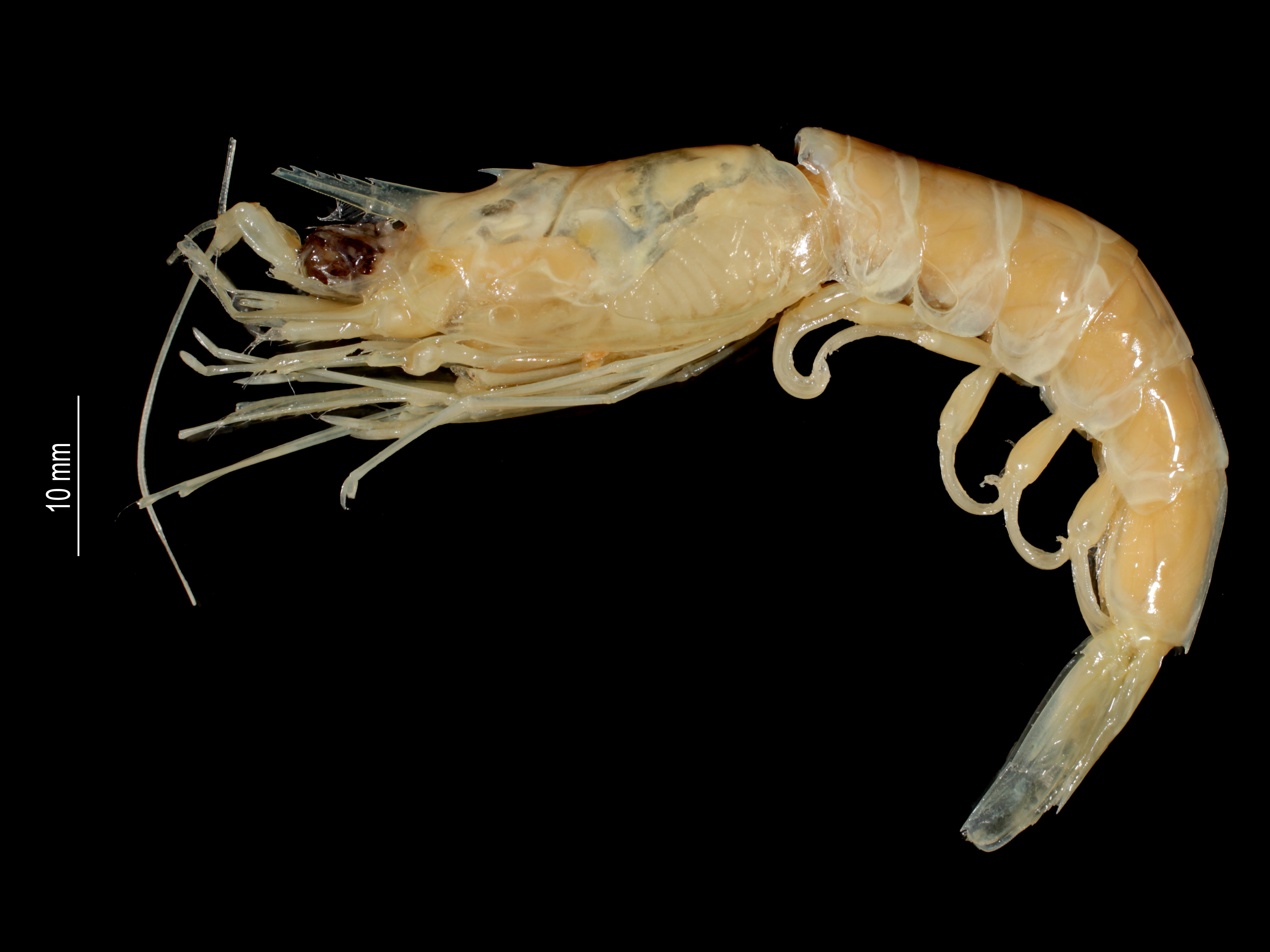

Scientific classification
- Domain: Eukaryota
- Kingdom: Animalia
- Phylum: Arthropoda
- Class: Malacostraca
- Order: Decapoda
- Suborder: Dendrobranchiata
- Family: Solenoceridae
- Genus: Hymenopenaeus
- Species: H. methalli

Binomial name
- Hymenopenaeus methalli Crosnier & Dall, 2004

= Hymenopenaeus methalli =

Species of crustacean

Hymenopenaeus methalli is a species of prawn in the family Solenocridae. The species range is in the Western Central Pacific, living at depths from 570 to 855 meters below the ocean surface.
