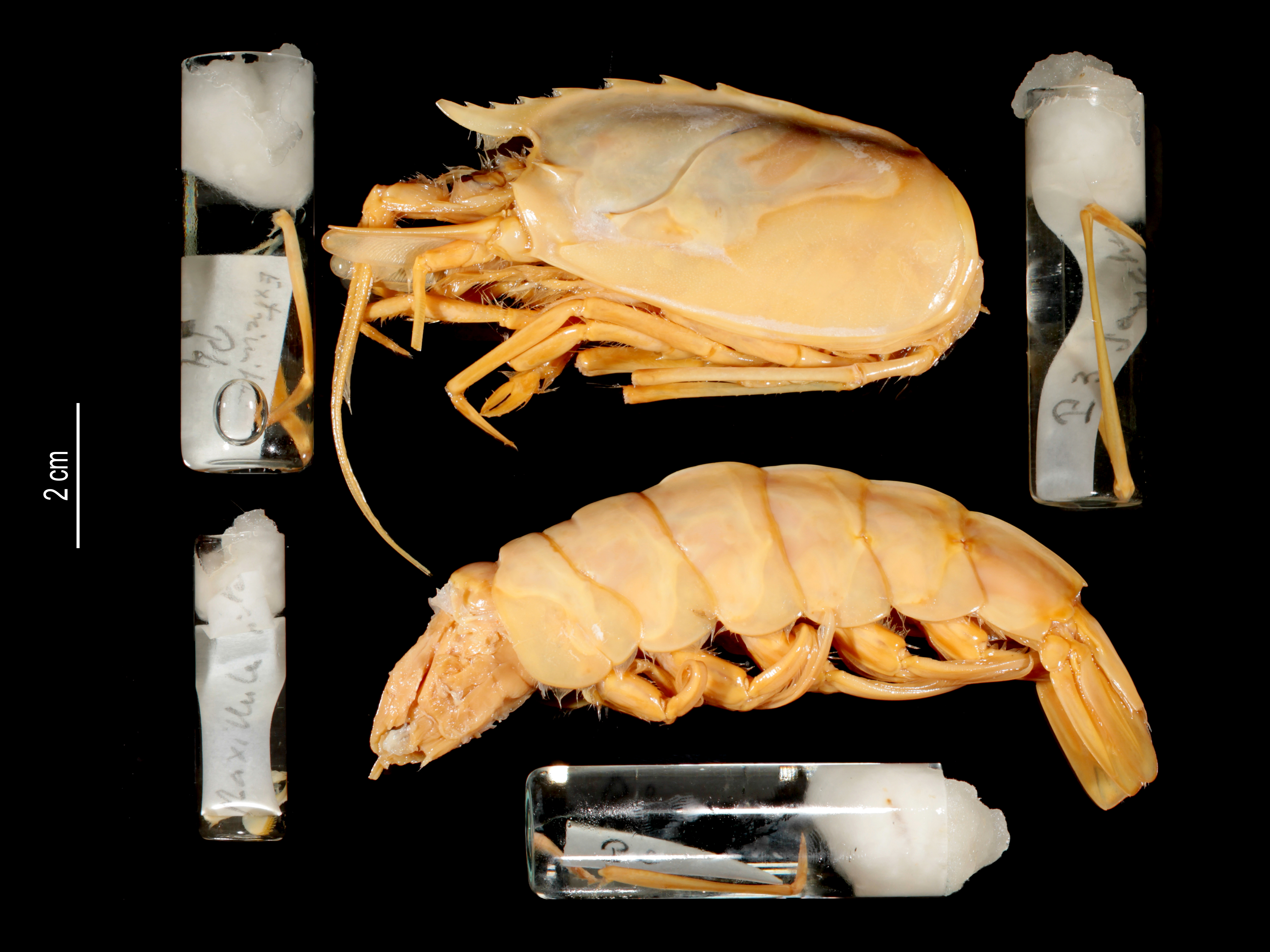

Scientific classification
- Kingdom: Animalia
- Phylum: Arthropoda
- Class: Malacostraca
- Order: Decapoda
- Suborder: Dendrobranchiata
- Family: Solenoceridae
- Genus: Cryptopenaeus
- Species: C. clevai

Binomial name
- Cryptopenaeus clevai Crosnier, 1984

= Cryptopenaeus clevai =

Species of crustacean

Cryptopenaeus clevai is a species of decapod within the family Solenoceridae. The species is found in the Indian Ocean near Indonesia, where it lives at depths of 410 to 587 meters.
