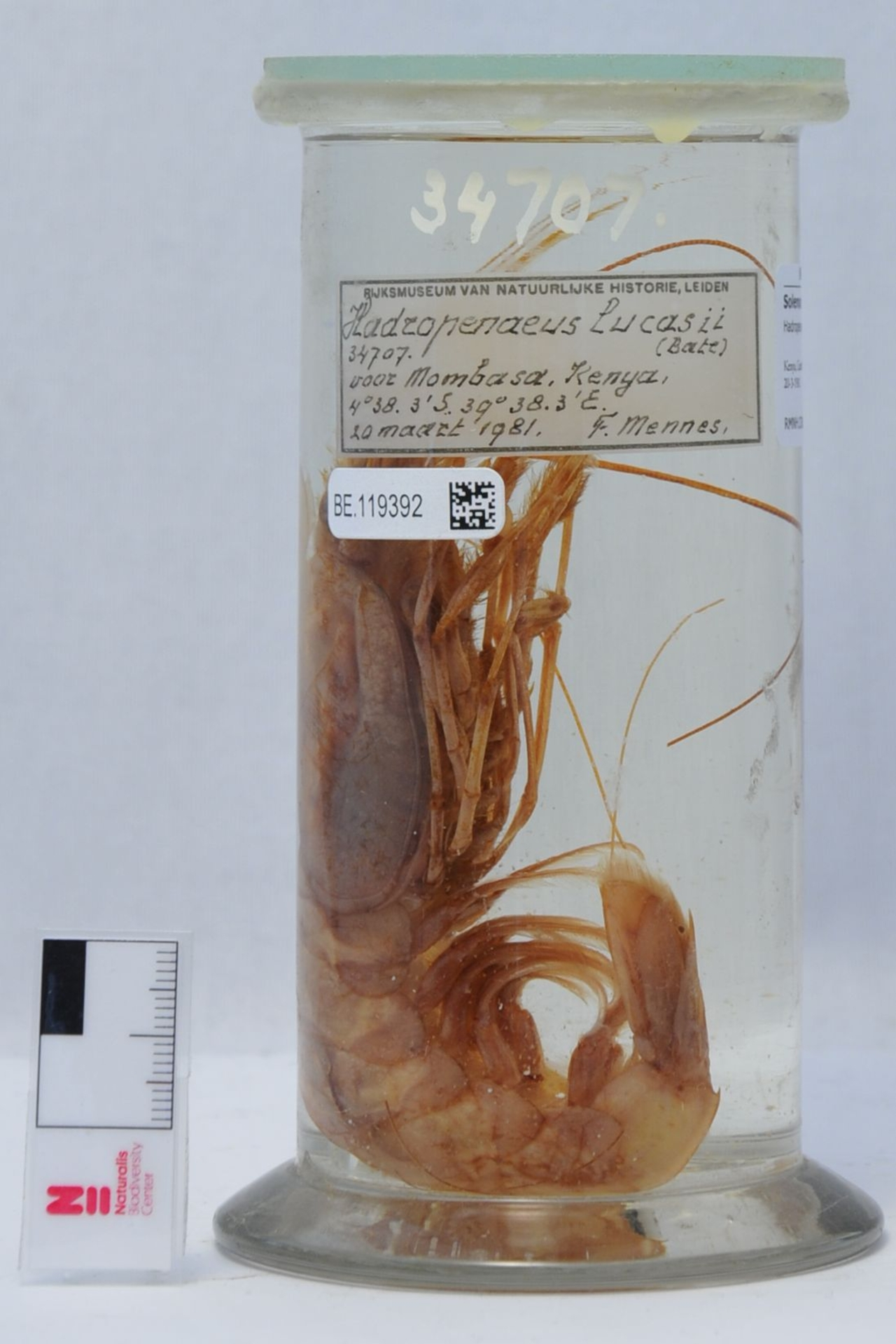

Scientific classification
- Kingdom: Animalia
- Phylum: Arthropoda
- Class: Malacostraca
- Order: Decapoda
- Suborder: Dendrobranchiata
- Family: Solenoceridae
- Genus: Hadropenaeus
- Species: H. lucasii

Binomial name
- Hadropenaeus lucasii (Spence Bate, 1881)

= Hadropenaeus lucasii =

Species of prawn

Hadropenaeus lucasii, commonly known by the FAO as the trident shrimp, is a species of decapod belonging to the family Solenoceridae. It is found in the Indo-West Pacific, from Madagascar to Japan as well as Indonesia and Hawaii, at a depth of 180 to 500 m (590 to 1,640 ft).

The species was originally described as Solenocera lucasii by Charles Spence Bate in 1881, who had collected it south of New Guinea at a depth of 130 fathoms (780 ft; 240 m).

== Description ==
Hadropenaeus lucasii grows to a maximum length of 7.25 cm (2.85 in) for males or 10 cm (3.9 in) for females – the carapace growing to up to 18.5 mm (0.73 in) or 25.5 mm (1.00 in) for males and females, respectively. Its rostrum is short and has seven teeth.
