= Hadropenaeus spinicaudatus =

Scientific classification
- Kingdom: Animalia
- Phylum: Arthropoda
- Clade: Pancrustacea
- Class: Malacostraca
- Order: Decapoda
- Suborder: Dendrobranchiata
- Family: Solenoceridae
- Genus: Hadropenaeus
- Species: H. spinicaudatus

Binomial name
- Hadropenaeus spinicaudatus Liu & Zhong, 1983

Synonyms
- Hadropenaeus spinicauda Liu & Zhong, 1983

Species of crustaceans

Hadropenaeus spinicaudatus, the spine-backed hadropenaeus is a species of decapod within the family Solenoceridae. The species is found in the West Pacific around New Caledonia at depths of 217 to 400 meters in benthic environments.
