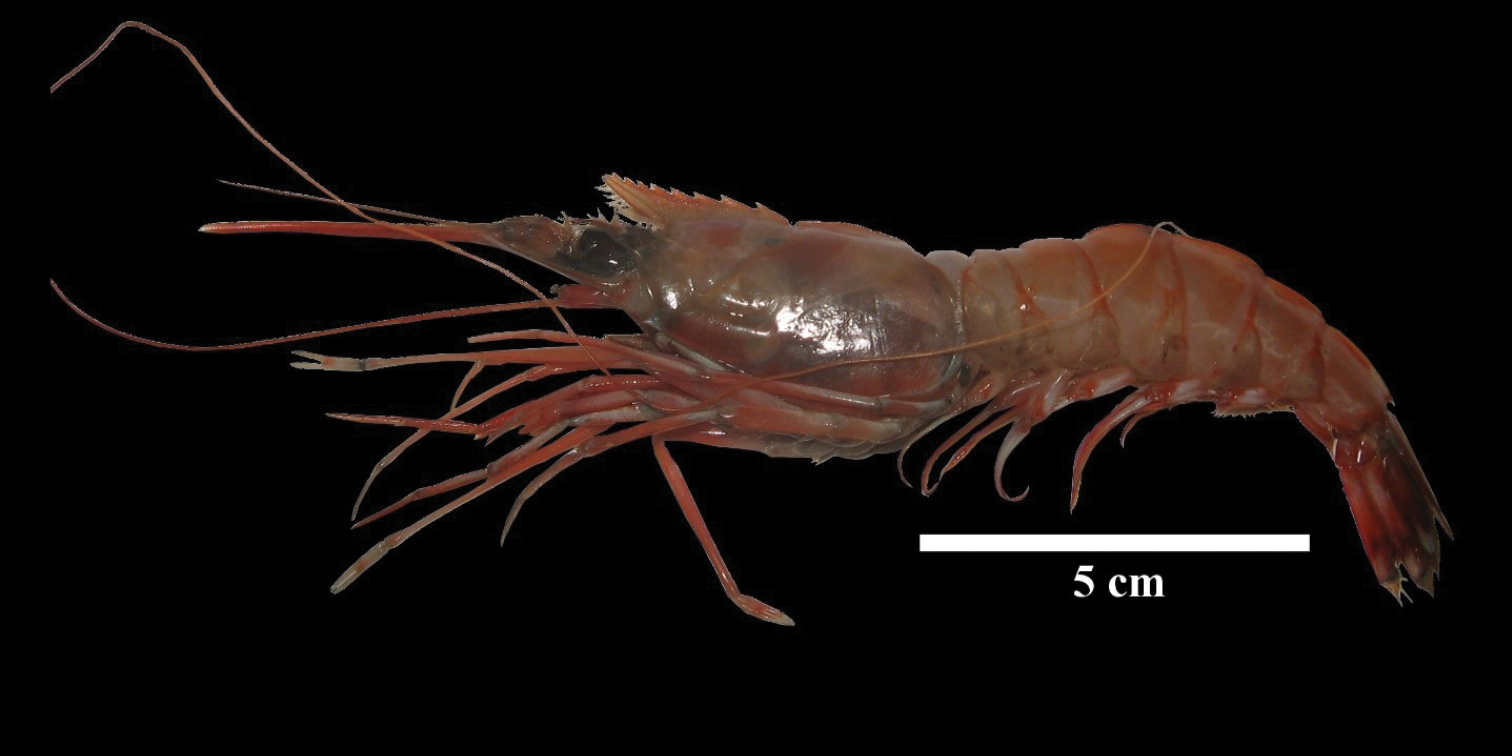

Scientific classification
- Kingdom: Animalia
- Phylum: Arthropoda
- Class: Malacostraca
- Order: Decapoda
- Suborder: Dendrobranchiata
- Family: Solenoceridae
- Genus: Solenocera
- Species: S. acuminata

Binomial name
- Solenocera acuminata Pérez Farfante & Bullis, 1973

= Solenocera acuminata =

Species of crustaceans

Solenocera acuminata is a species of decapod within the family Solenoceridae. The species is distributed in and around parts of the Caribbean Sea at depths of at depths of 150 to 400 meters, with the highest biomass being at 330 to 380 meters. Females are larger than males reaching lengths of 95.2 mm. The species is being considered for deep-sea fisheries in the Caribbean region of Colombia, however more information on the species is needed for fisheries to begin targeting the species.
