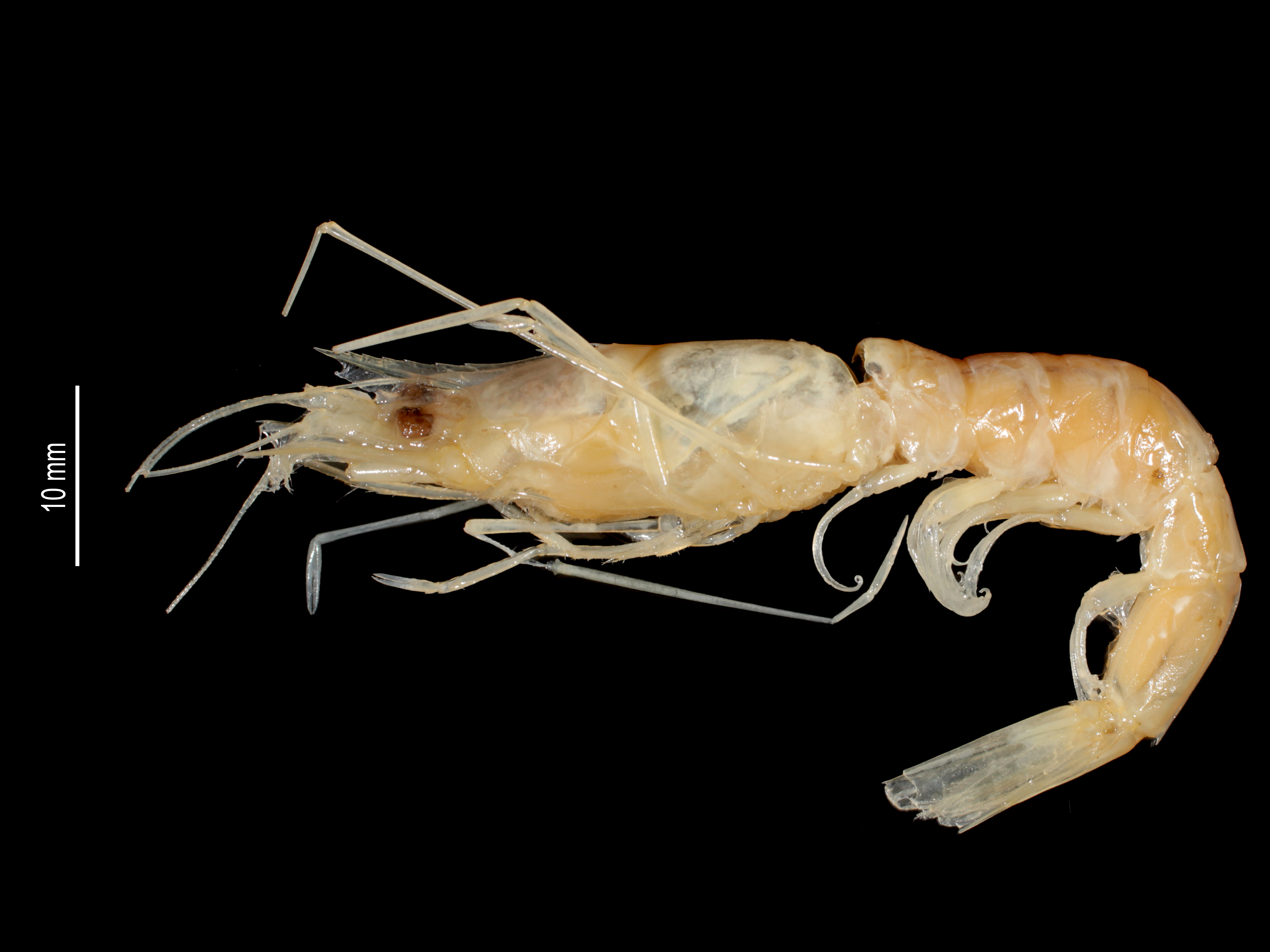
- Hymenopenaeus chacei

Scientific classification
- Domain: Eukaryota
- Kingdom: Animalia
- Phylum: Arthropoda
- Class: Malacostraca
- Order: Decapoda
- Suborder: Dendrobranchiata
- Family: Solenoceridae
- Genus: Hymenopenaeus; Smith, 1882

= Hymenopenaeus =

Genus of crustaceans

Hymenopenaeus is a genus of prawns containing 17 species.

== Species ==
- Hymenopenaeus aphoticus Burkenroad, 1936
- Hymenopenaeus chacei Crosnier & Forest, 1969
- Hymenopenaeus debilis Smith, 1882
- Hymenopenaeus doris Faxon, 1893
- Hymenopenaeus equalis Spence Bate, 1888
- Hymenopenaeus fallax Crosnier & Dall, 2004
- Hymenopenaeus fattahi Ramadan, 1938
- Hymenopenaeus furici Crosnier, 1978
- Hymenopenaeus halli Bruce, 1966
- Hymenopenaeus laevis Spence Bate, 1881
- Hymenopenaeus methalli Crosnier & Dall, 2004
- Hymenopenaeus neptunus Spence Bate, 1881
- Hymenopenaeus nereus Faxon, 1893
- Hymenopenaeus obliquirostris Spence Bate, 1881
- Hymenopenaeus propinquus de Man, 1907
- Hymenopenaeus sewelli Ramadan, 1938
- Hymenopenaeus tuerkayi Crosnier, 1995
