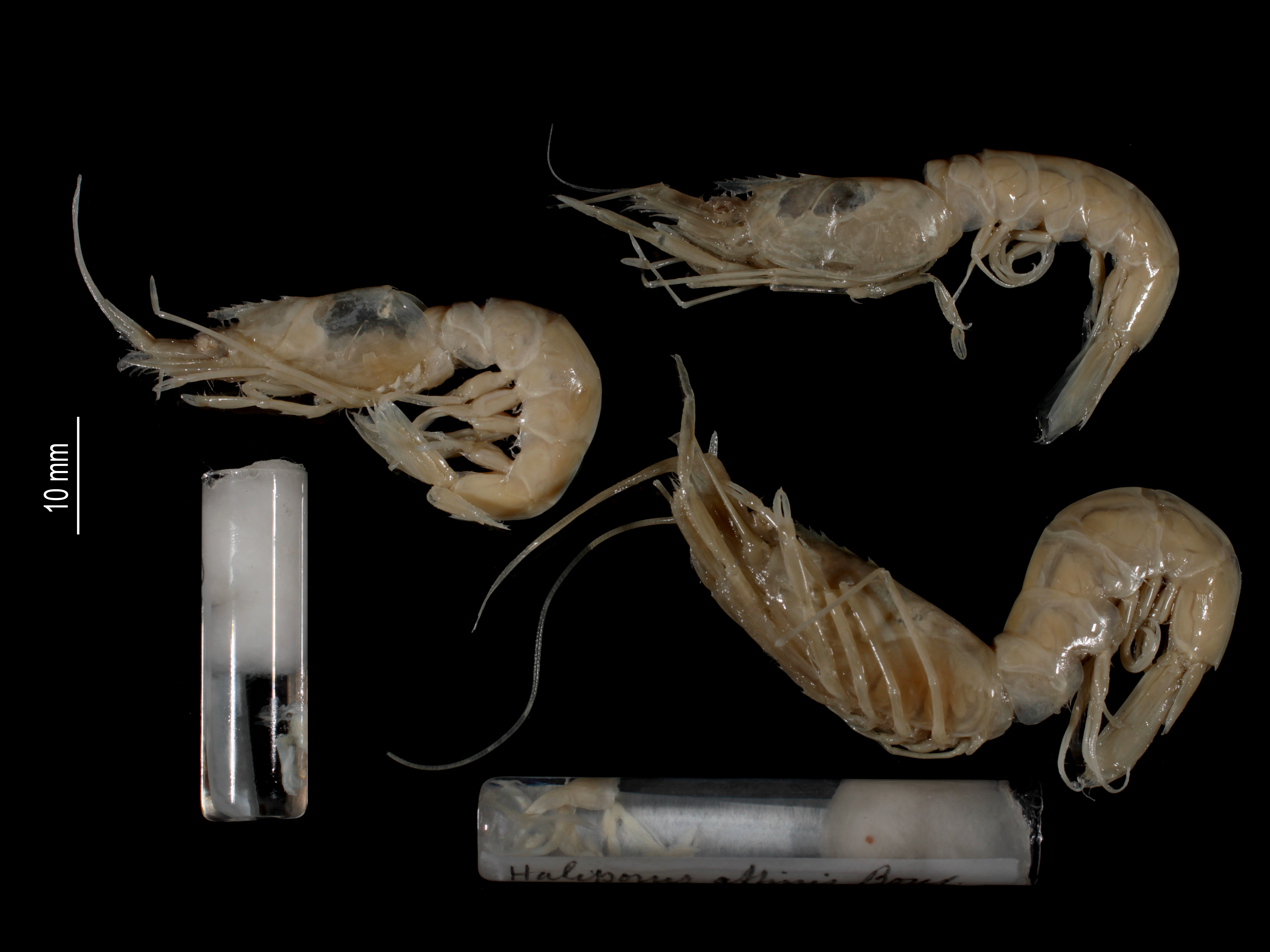
- Hadropenaeus affinis

Scientific classification
- Domain: Eukaryota
- Kingdom: Animalia
- Phylum: Arthropoda
- Class: Malacostraca
- Order: Decapoda
- Suborder: Dendrobranchiata
- Family: Solenoceridae
- Genus: Hadropenaeus; Pérez Farfante, 1977

= Hadropenaeus =

Genus of crustaceans

Hadropenaeus is a genus of prawns within the family Solenoceridae. Members of this genus are found at depths up to 1280 meters.

== Species ==
- Hadropenaeus affinis (Bouvier, 1906)
- Hadropenaeus lucasii (Spence Bate, 1881)
- Hadropenaeus modestus (Smith, 1885)
- Hadropenaeus spinicaudatus Liu & Zhong, 1983
