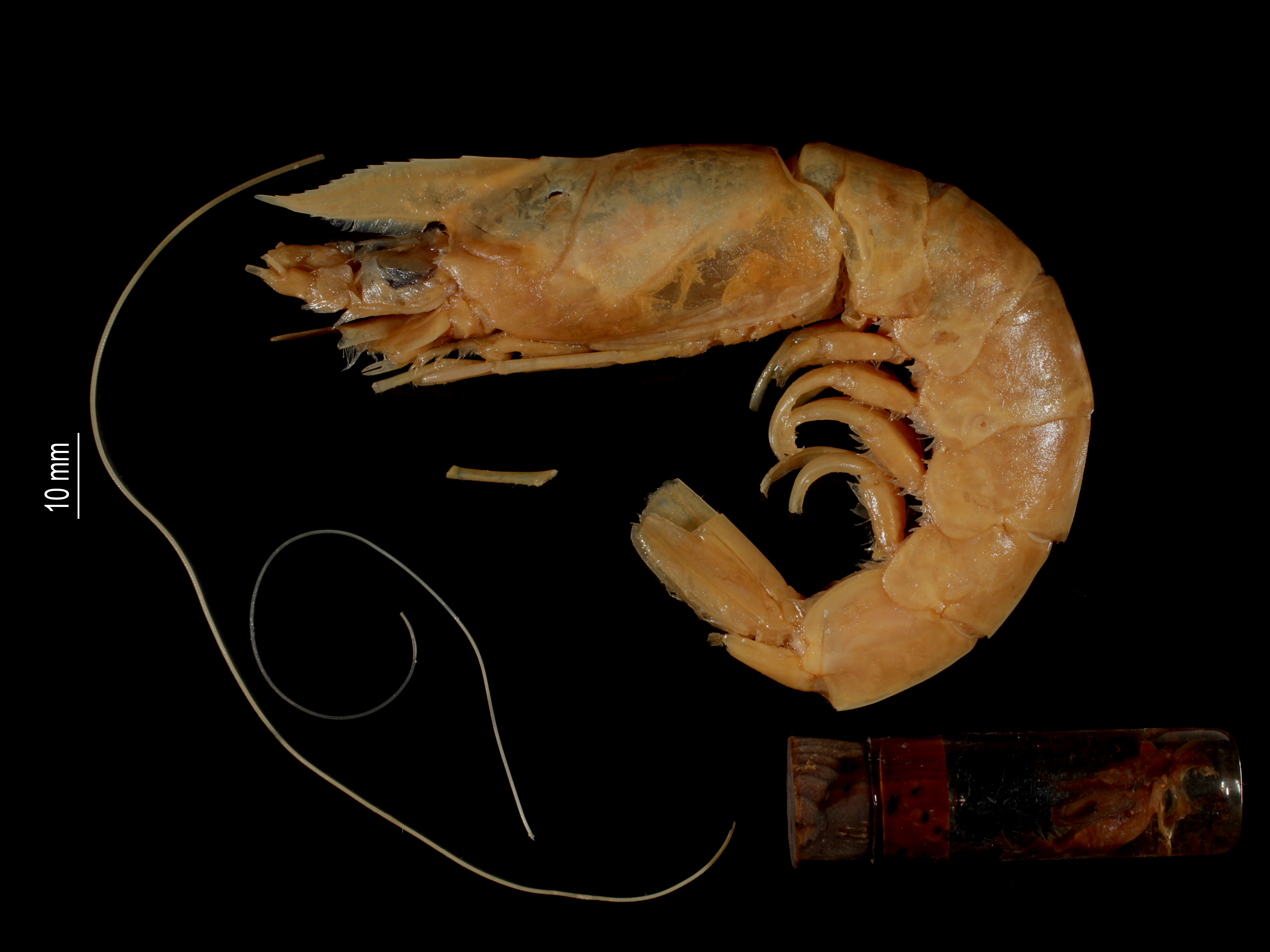
- Haliporoides triarthrus

Scientific classification
- Kingdom: Animalia
- Phylum: Arthropoda
- Clade: Pancrustacea
- Class: Malacostraca
- Order: Decapoda
- Suborder: Dendrobranchiata
- Family: Solenoceridae
- Genus: Haliporoides; Stebbing, 1914

Type species
- Haliporoides triarthrus Stebbing, 1914

Synonyms
- Parahaliporus Kubo, 1949

= Haliporoides =

Genus of crustaceans

Haliporoides is a genus of decapods within the family Solenoceridae. Members of this genus are found in the Indian and Pacific Ocean.

They are deep-water demersal, typically bottom-trawled at 200 to 500 metres. Species may be called knife shrimp, due to their prominent, blade-like rostra.

H. sibogae is fished commercially in eastern and western Australia and in southern Japan. In Australia, it is called "royal red prawn" or "red spot king prawn". In Japanese, it is higenaga-ebi (ヒゲナガエビ, 'long-horned prawn') or taka-ebi (たかえび). Its FAO name is "jack-knife shrimp" (code JAQ).

H. triarthrus (pink prawn, knife shrimp) is fished off Mozambique and South Africa.

Haliporoides sibogae (Haliporus sibogae de Man 1907, p. 138) and Metapenaeopsis sibogae (Metapeneus sibogae de Man 1907, p. 131) were both described by Johannes Govertus de Man in the same account of the Siboga Expedition, but they are distinct species.

== Species ==
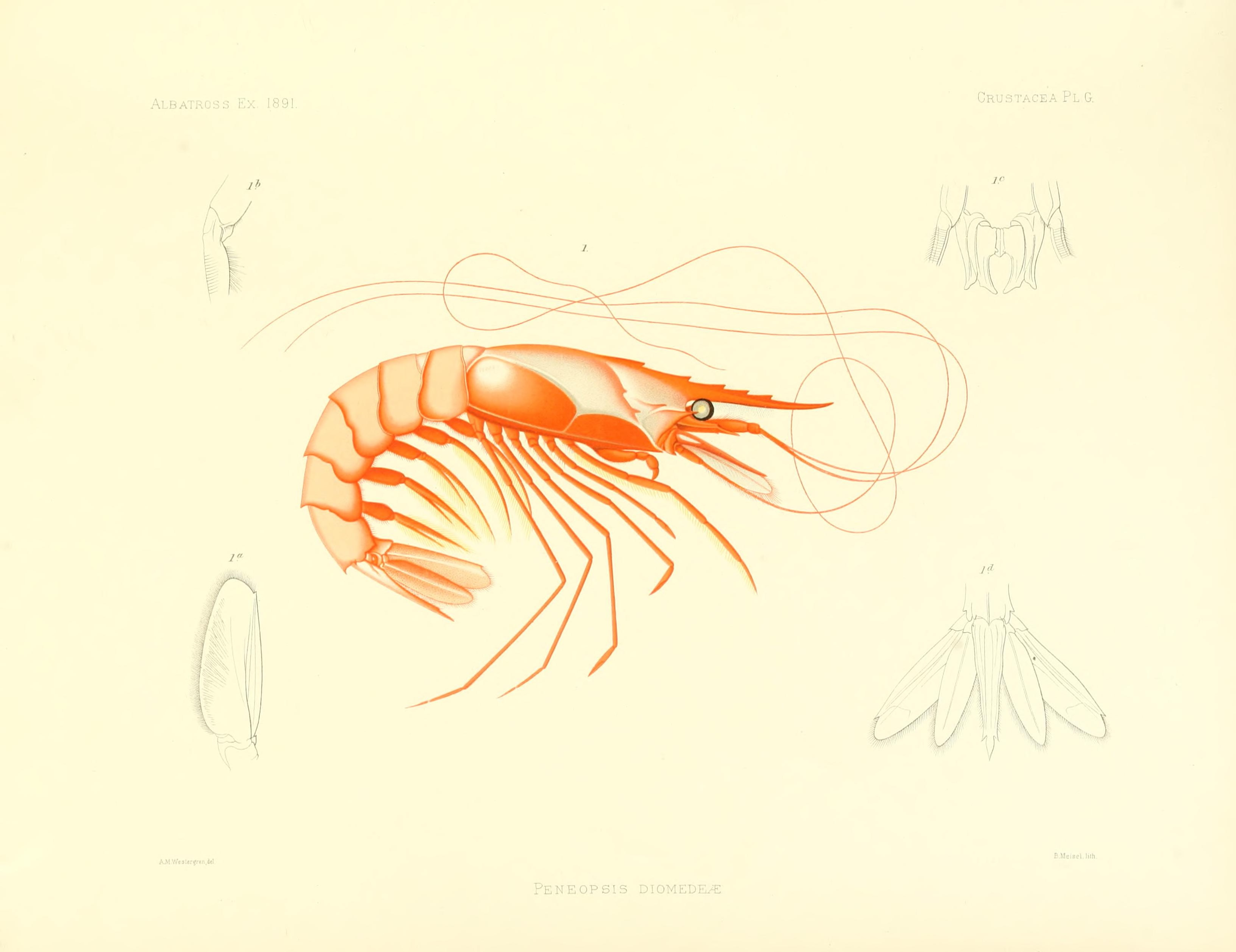
Illustration of Haliporoides diomedeae.

- Haliporoides cristatus (Kensley, Tranter and Griffin, 1987)
- Haliporoides diomedeae (Faxon, 1893)
- Haliporoides sibogae (De Man, 1907)
- Haliporoides triarthrus (Stebbing, 1914)
