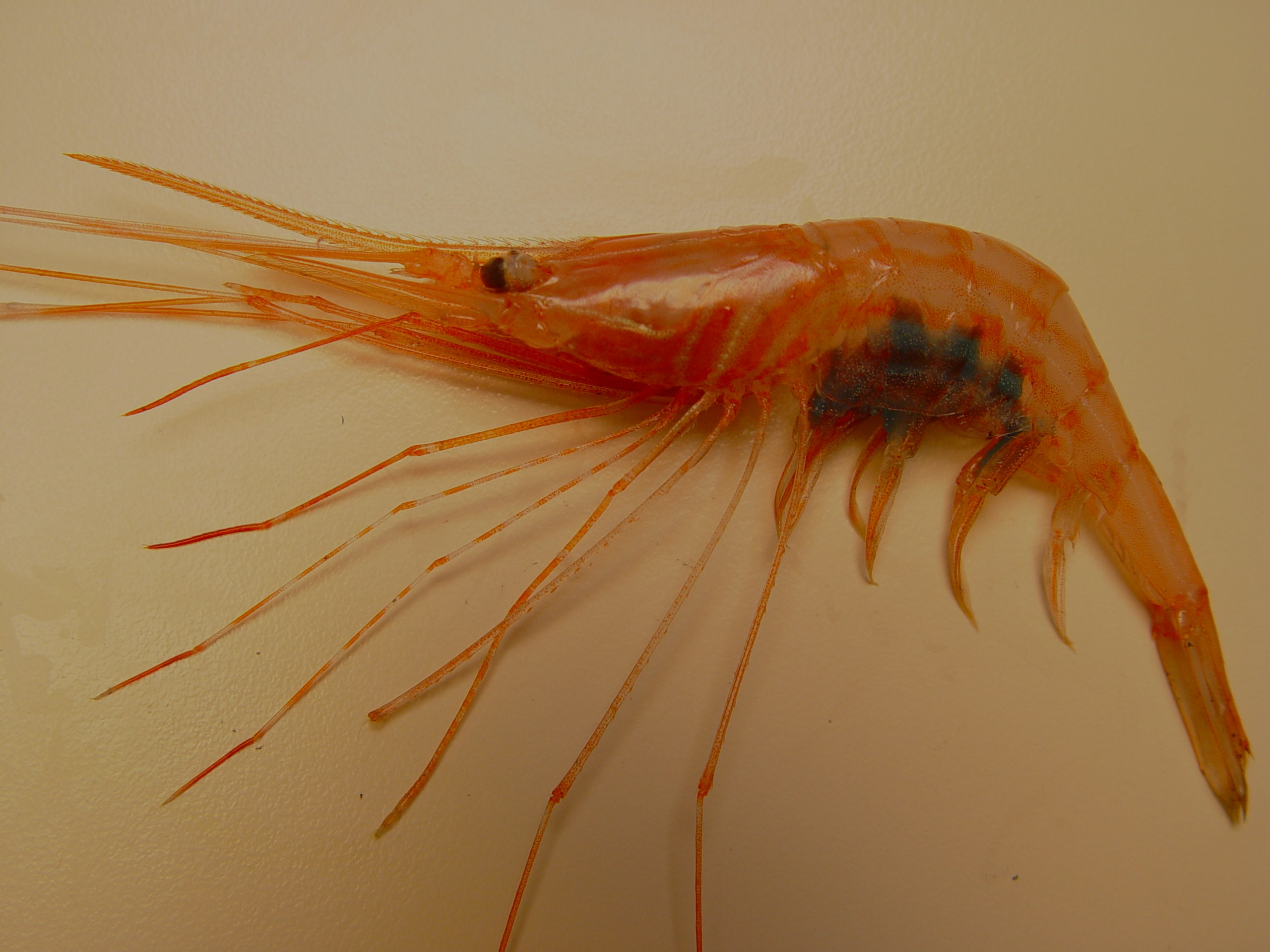
- Pleoticus robustus

Scientific classification
- Domain: Eukaryota
- Kingdom: Animalia
- Phylum: Arthropoda
- Class: Malacostraca
- Order: Decapoda
- Suborder: Dendrobranchiata
- Family: Solenoceridae
- Genus: Pleoticus; Spence Bate, 1888

Type species
- Philonicus mülleri Spence Bate, 1888

Synonyms
- Faxonia Bouvier, 1905; Parartemesia Bouvier, 1905; Philonicus Spence Bate, 1888

= Pleoticus =

Species of crustaceans

Pleoticus is a genus of decapods within the family Solenoceridae. Members of this genus are distributed in marine waters 12 to 2060 meters below sea level.

== Species ==
- Pleoticus muelleri (Spence Bate, 1888)
- Pleoticus robustus (Smith, 1885)
- Pleoticus steindachneri (Balss, 1914)
