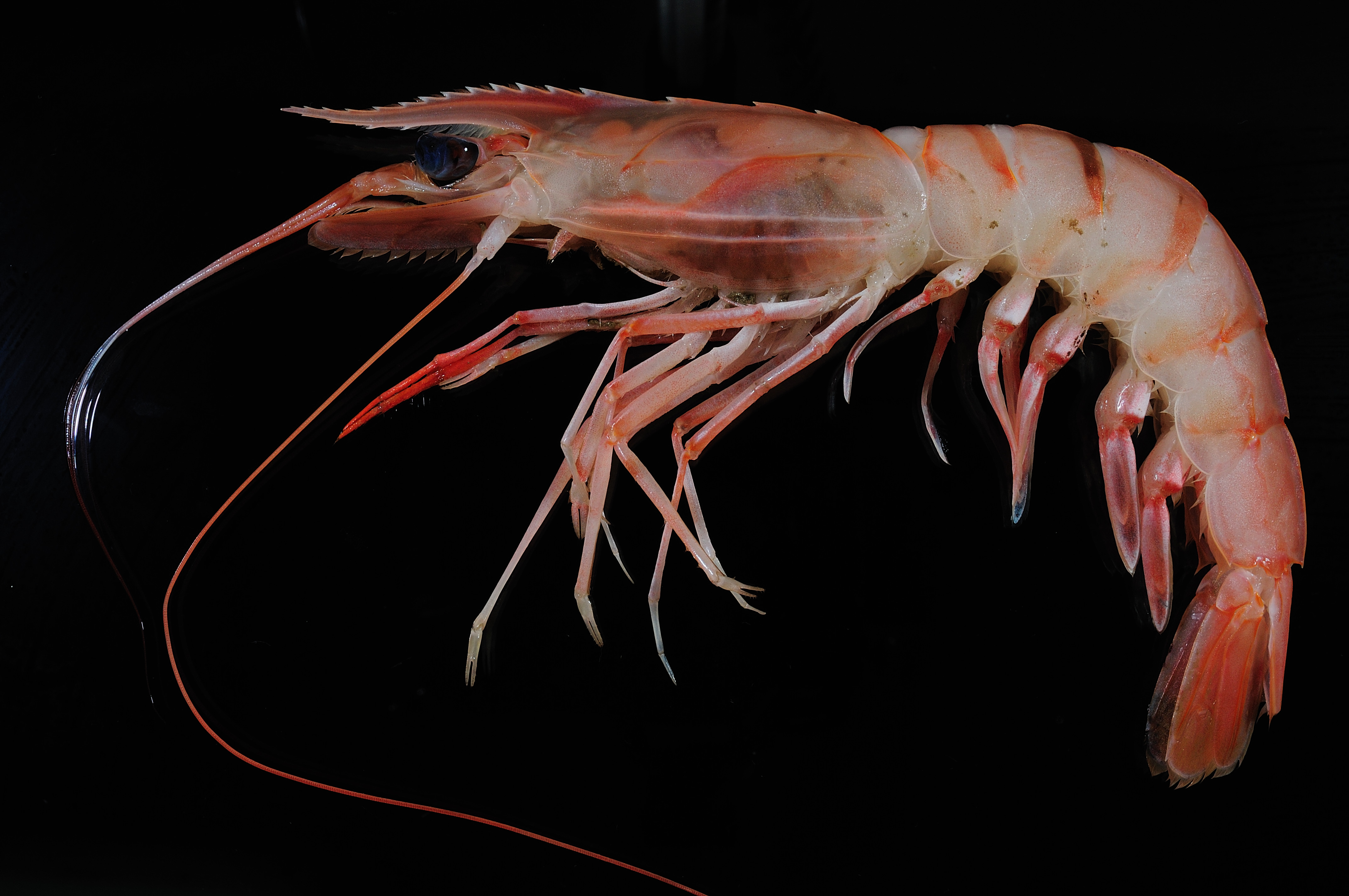

Scientific classification
- Domain: Eukaryota
- Kingdom: Animalia
- Phylum: Arthropoda
- Class: Malacostraca
- Order: Decapoda
- Suborder: Dendrobranchiata
- Family: Solenoceridae
- Genus: Maximiliaeus; Chan, 2012
- Species: M. odoceros

Binomial name
- Maximiliaeus odoceros Chan, 2012

= Maximiliaeus =

Genus of crustacean

Maximiliaeus is a monotypic genus of decapods within the family Solenoceridae. The sole species is Maximiliaeus odoceros. It was discovered after being collected off Papua New Guinea in the Solomon Sea. The carapace of the species has bearing teeth along the entire dorsal border, along with three parallel carinae that run the entire length of the lateral carapace.
