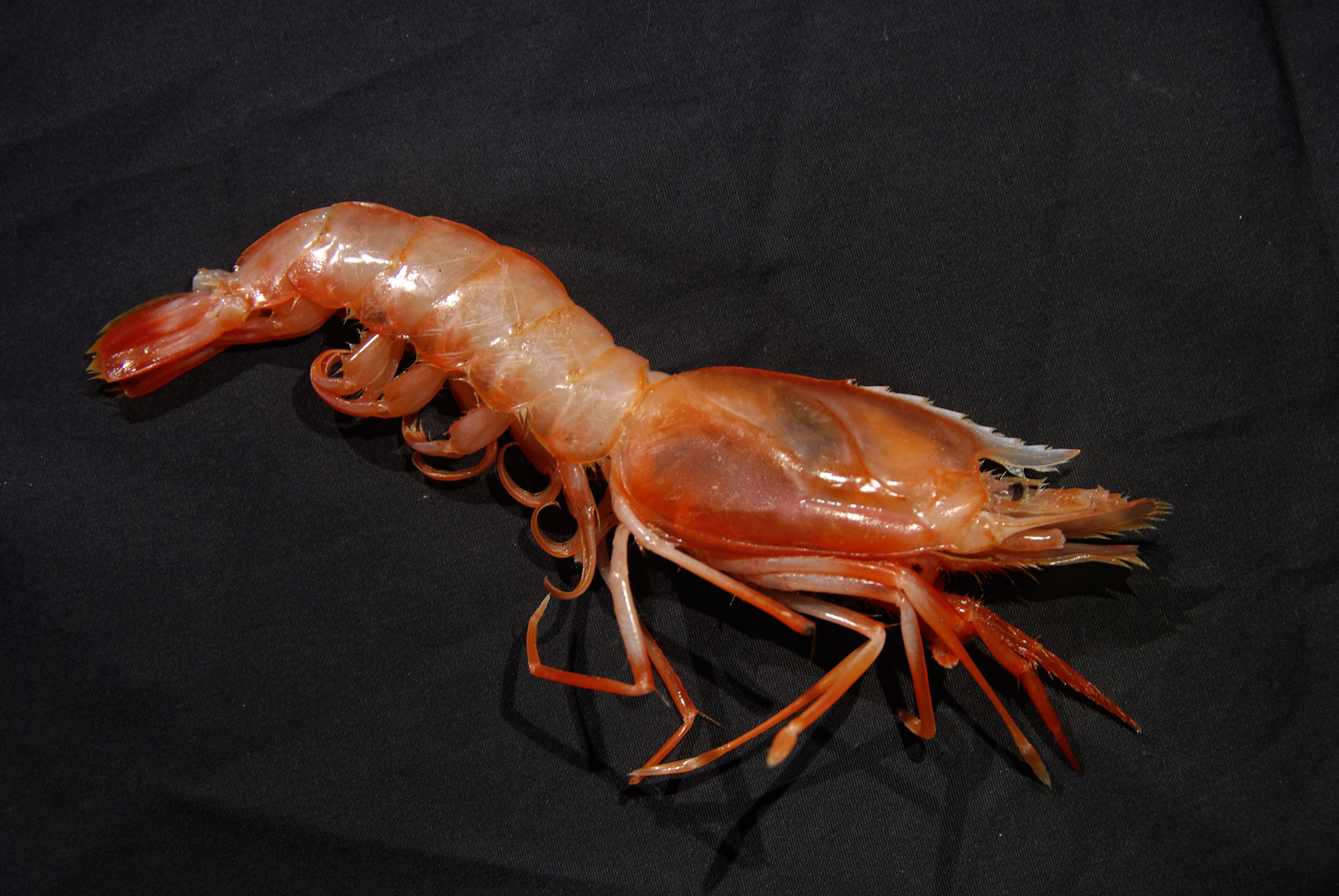
- Cryptopenaeus sp.

Scientific classification
- Domain: Eukaryota
- Kingdom: Animalia
- Phylum: Arthropoda
- Class: Malacostraca
- Order: Decapoda
- Suborder: Dendrobranchiata
- Family: Solenoceridae
- Genus: Cryptopenaeus; De Freitas, 1979

= Cryptopenaeus =

Genus of crustaceans

Cryptopenaeus is a genus of prawns within the family Solenoceridae.

== Species ==
- Cryptopenaeus brevirostris Hayashi in Baba, Hayashi & Toriyama, 1986
- Cryptopenaeus catherinae De Freitas, 1979
- Cryptopenaeus clevai Crosnier, 1984
- Cryptopenaeus crosnieri Pérez Farfante & Kensley, 1985
- Cryptopenaeus sinensis (Liu & Zhong, 1983)
