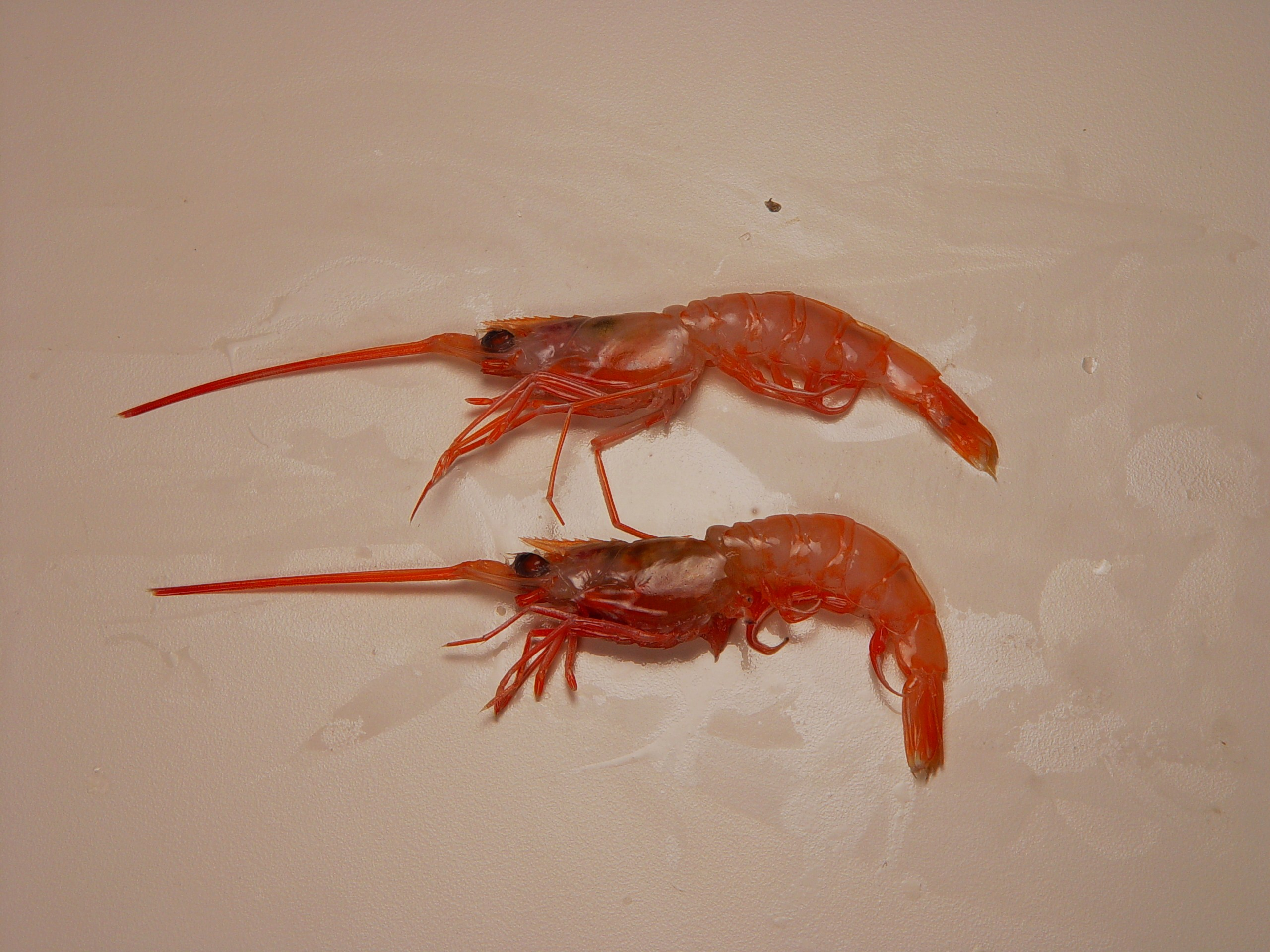
- Humpback shrimp (Solenocera vioscai) from the Gulf of Mexico

Scientific classification
- Domain: Eukaryota
- Kingdom: Animalia
- Phylum: Arthropoda
- Class: Malacostraca
- Order: Decapoda
- Suborder: Dendrobranchiata
- Family: Solenoceridae
- Genus: Solenocera; Lucas, 1849

Type species
- Peneus siphonoceros Philippi, 1840

= Solenocera =

Genus of prawns

Solenocera is a genus of prawns in the family Solenoceridae. Solenocera occur from 0 to 2,067 meters deep in the ocean.

== Species ==
Species include:

- Solenocera acuminata Pérez Farfante & Bullis, 1973
- Solenocera africana Stebbing, 1917
- Solenocera agassizii Faxon, 1893
- Solenocera alfonso Pérez Farfante, 1981
- Solenocera algoensis Barnard, 1947
- Solenocera alticarinata Kubo, 1949
- Solenocera annectens Wood-Mason in Wood-Mason & Alcock, 1891
- Solenocera atlantidis Burkenroad, 1939
- Solenocera australiana Pérez Farfante & Grey, 1980
- Solenocera barunajaya Crosnier, 1994
- Solenocera bedokensis Hall, 1962
- Solenocera bifurcata Dall, 1999
- Solenocera burukovskyi Timofeev, 1993
- Solenocera choprai Nataraj, 1945
- Solenocera comata Stebbing, 1915
- Solenocera crassicornis H. Milne Edwards, 1837
- Solenocera faxoni de Man, 1907
- Solenocera florea Burkenroad, 1938
- Solenocera geijskesi Holthuis, 1959
- Solenocera gurjanovae Starobogatov, 1972
- Solenocera halli Starobogatov, 1972
- Solenocera hextii Wood-Mason & Alcock, 1891
- Solenocera koelbeli de Man, 1911
- Solenocera maldivensis Borradaile, 1910
- Solenocera mascarensis Burukovsky, 1993
- Solenocera melantho de Man, 1907
- Solenocera membranacea Risso, 1816
- Solenocera moosai Crosnier, 1985
- Solenocera mutator Burkenroad, 1938
- Solenocera necopina Burkenroad, 1939
- Solenocera pectinata (Spence Bate, 1888)
- Solenocera pectinulata Kubo, 1949
- Solenocera phuongi Starobogatov, 1972
- Solenocera rathbuni Ramadan, 1938
- Solenocera spinajugo Hall, 1961
- Solenocera vioscai Burkenroad, 1934
- Solenocera waltairensis M.J. George & Muthu, 1970
- Solenocera zarenkovi Starobogatov, 1972
