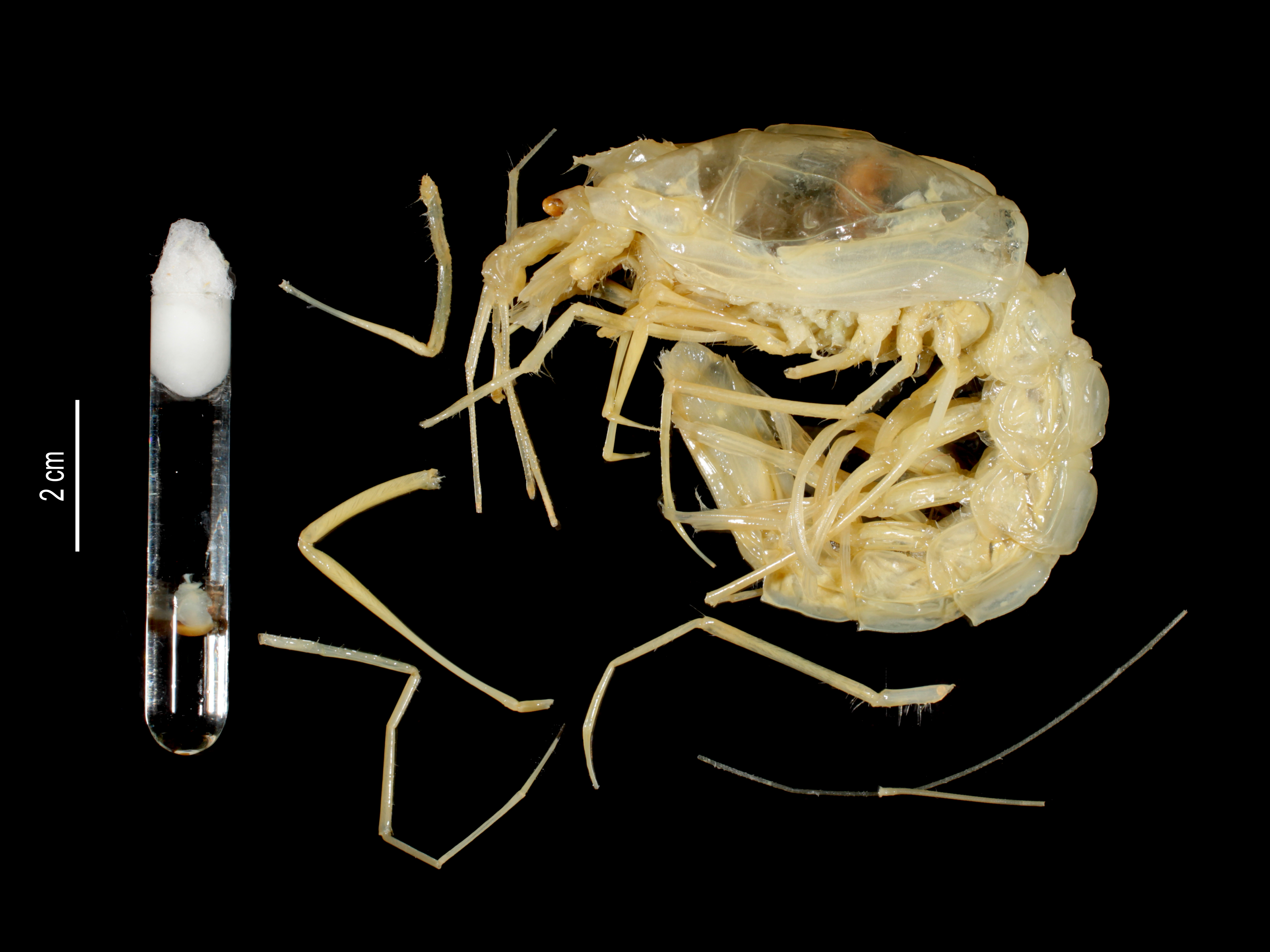
- Gordonella kensleyi

Scientific classification
- Domain: Eukaryota
- Kingdom: Animalia
- Phylum: Arthropoda
- Class: Malacostraca
- Order: Decapoda
- Suborder: Dendrobranchiata
- Family: Solenoceridae
- Genus: Gordonella; Tirmizi, 1960

= Gordonella =

Genus of crustaceans

Gordonella is a genus of prawns within the family Solenoceridae. There are currently 3 species assigned to the genus.

== Species ==
- Gordonella kensleyi Crosnier, 1989
- Gordonella paravillosa Crosnier, 1989
- Gordonella villosa (Alcock & Anderson, 1894)
