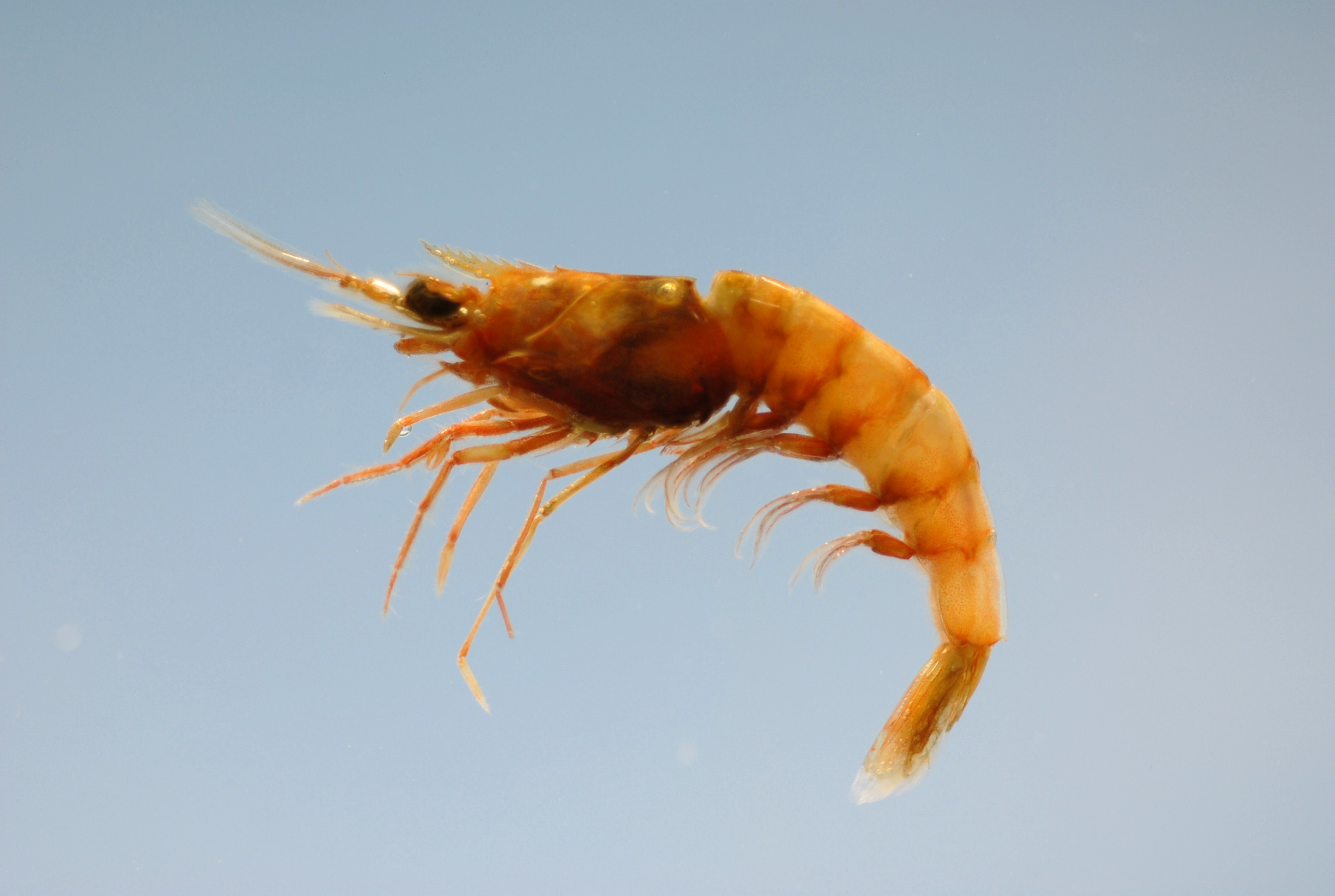
- Mesopenaeus tropicalis

Scientific classification
- Domain: Eukaryota
- Kingdom: Animalia
- Phylum: Arthropoda
- Class: Malacostraca
- Order: Decapoda
- Suborder: Dendrobranchiata
- Superfamily: Penaeoidea
- Family: Solenoceridae; Wood-Mason in Wood-Mason and Alcock, 1891

= Solenoceridae =

Family of crustaceans

Solenoceridae is a family of decapods, containing 10 genera. Members of this family are marine, inhabiting shallow and offshore waters from the mid-continental shelf, ranging from depths to 1000 meters deep. Members of this family are also sometimes confused with other commercial shrimp species.

== Genera ==
- Archeosolenocera Carriol & Riou, 1991 †
- Cryptopenaeus de Freitas, 1979
- Gordonella Tirmizi, 1960
- Hadropenaeus Pérez Farfante, 1977
- Haliporoides Stebbing, 1914
- Haliporus Spence Bate, 1881
- Hymenopenaeus Smith, 1882
- Maximiliaeus Chan, 2012
- Mesopenaeus Pérez Farfante, 1977
- Pleoticus Spence Bate, 1888
- Priorhyncha Alencar, Pinheiro, Saraiva, de Oliveira & Santana, 2018 †
- Solenocera Lucas, 1849
