= Necrophage =

Animal that feeds on carrion

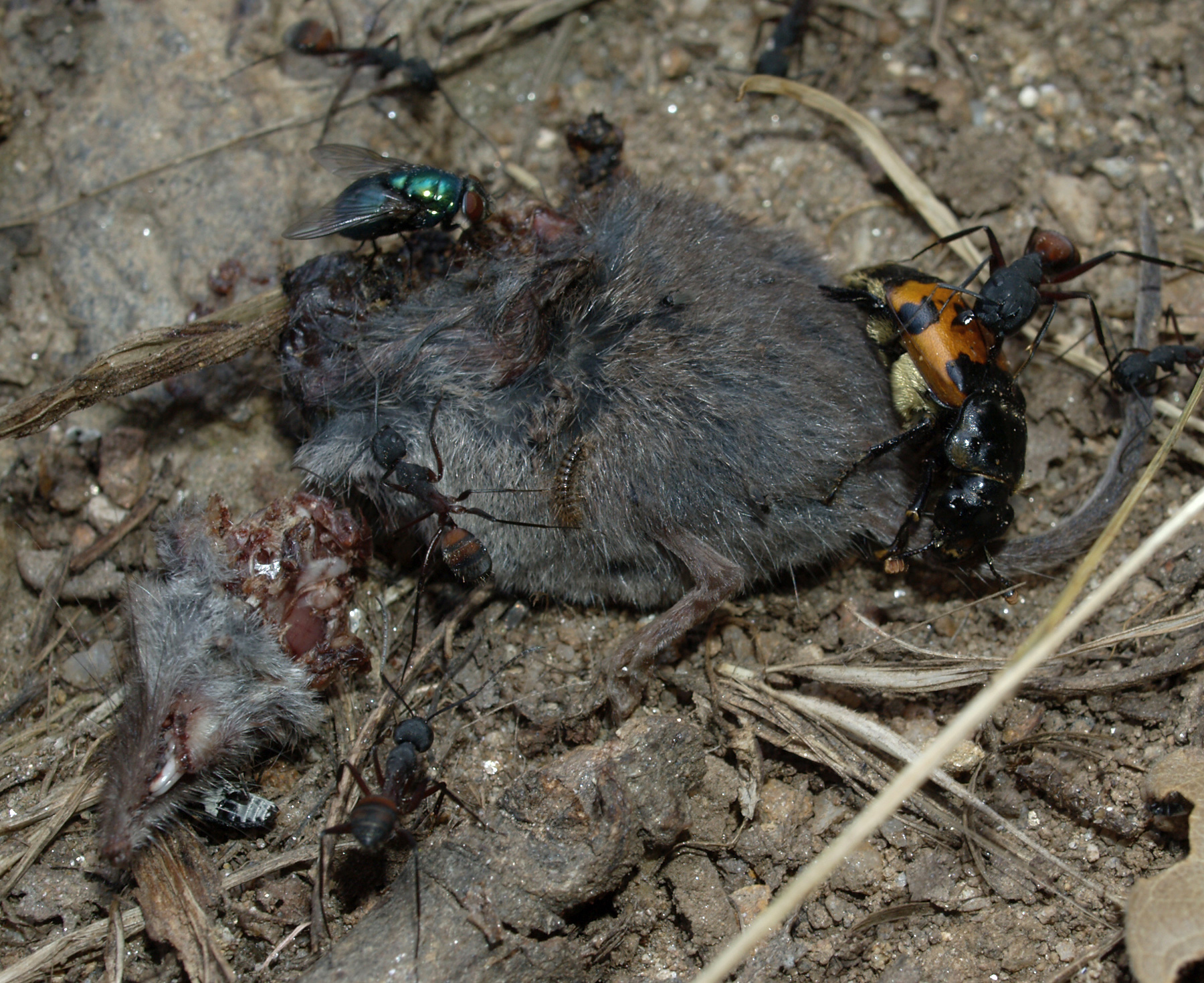
Carcass of a shrew surrounded by multiple necrophages, including a blow fly and burying beetle.

Necrophages (also known as carrion feeders) are animals that feed on decomposing dead animal biomass, such as the muscle and soft tissue of carcasses or corpses. The term derives from Greek nekros, meaning 'dead', and phagein, meaning 'to eat'. Many hundreds of necrophagous species have been identified including invertebrates in the insect, malacostracan and gastropod classes and vertebrates such as vultures, hyenas, quolls and wolves.

Necrophagous insects are important in forensic science as the presence of some species (e.g. Calliphora vomitoria) in a body, coupled with information on their development stage (e.g. egg, larva, pupa), can yield information on time of death. Information on the insect species present can also be used as evidence that a body has been moved, and analysis of insect tissue can be used as evidence that drugs or other substances were in the body.

Necrophages are useful for other purposes too. In healthcare, green bottle fly larvae are sometimes used to remove necrotic (dead) tissue from non-healing wounds, and in waste management, black soldier fly larvae are used to convert decomposing organic waste into animal feed. Biotechnological applications for necrophage-derived genes, molecules and microbes are also being explored.

== Classification ==
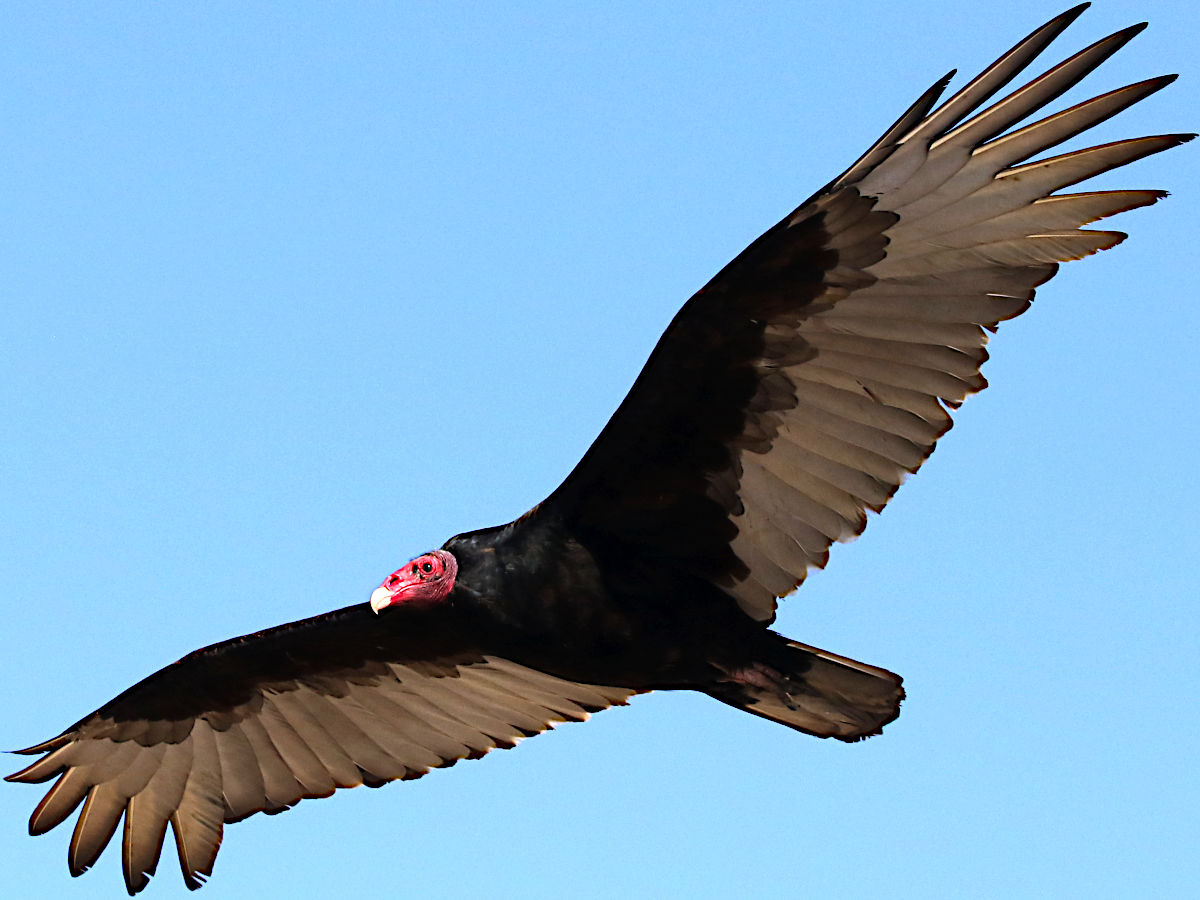
Gliding flight is one of many adaptations to carrion feeding seen in vultures.

Necrophages can be classified according to their nutritional reliance on carrion and also their level of adaptation to carrion feeding. Animals are described as 'obligate necrophages' if they use carrion as their sole or main food source and depend on carrion for survival or reproduction. The term 'specialists' is also sometimes used in recognition that these animals have traits favoring necrophagy and making other feeding behaviors difficult. For example, large wingspans facilitate the energy-efficient gliding vultures need to cover long distances in search of carrion, but reduce the agility needed to kill prey. Animals that eat carrion opportunistically and retain the traits needed to find and consume other food sources are described as 'facultative necrophages' and 'generalists'.

Both obligate and facultative necrophages are sometimes sub-classified as 'wet' and 'dry' feeders. These terms differentiate animals feeding on moist, putrefying tissue from animals feeding on desiccated and keratinized tissues.

== Invertebrates ==
=== Flies ===
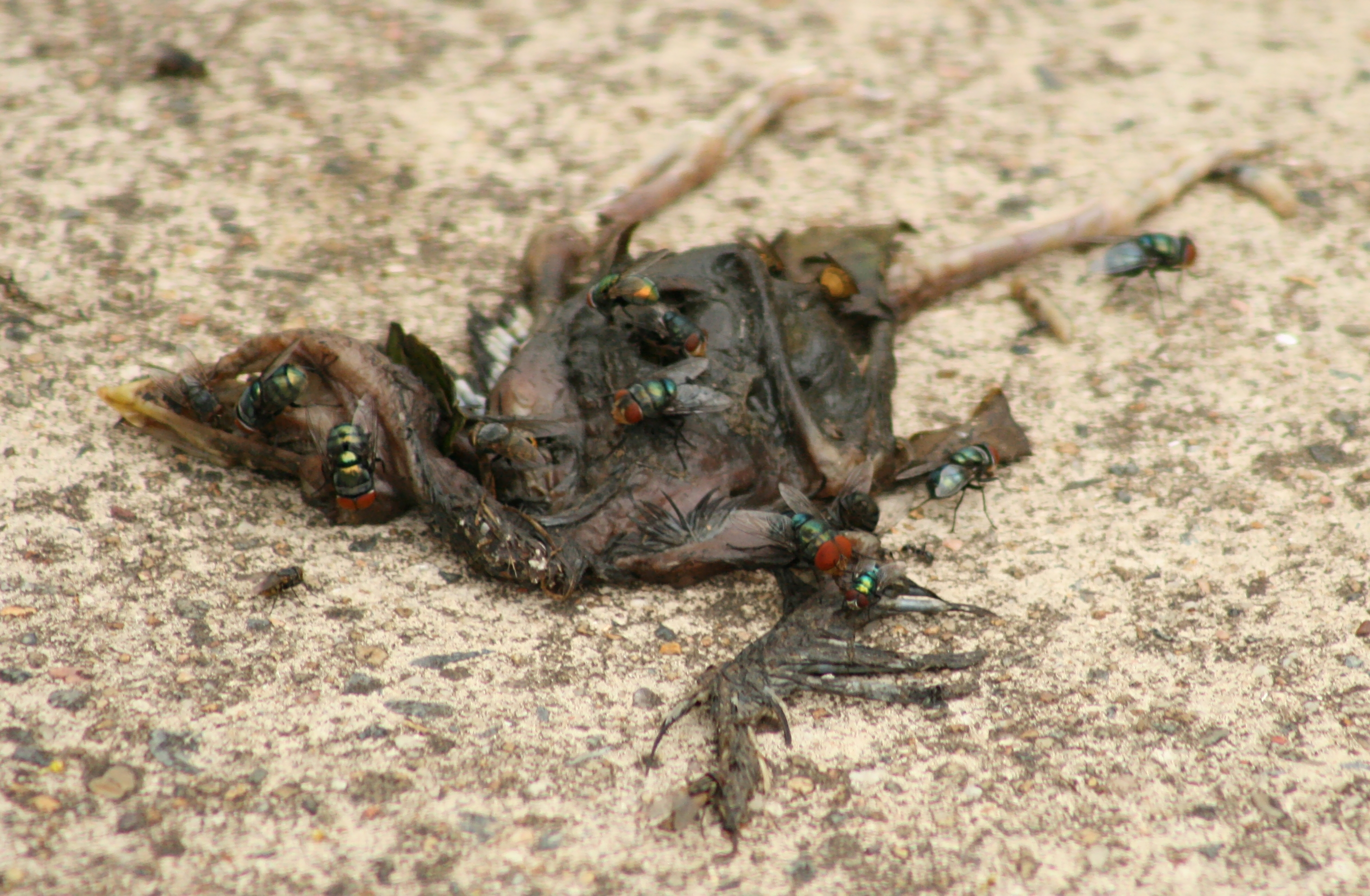
Chrysomya megacephala, a species of blow fly, laying eggs in a dead baby bird.

The European bone skipper, Thyreophora cynophila, is an obligately necrophagous fly. It relies on carrion bone marrow in the first stage of its life cycle. Many other types of fly are facultatively necrophagous. Examples commonly found on land include blow flies, flesh flies, muscid flies, black soldier flies, ensign flies and thread-horns. Other necrophagous flies, for example black flies and lake flies, are semi-aquatic. Types of carrion fed upon include wildlife, livestock and poultry carcasses, slaughterhouse and fishing discards, and human bodies.

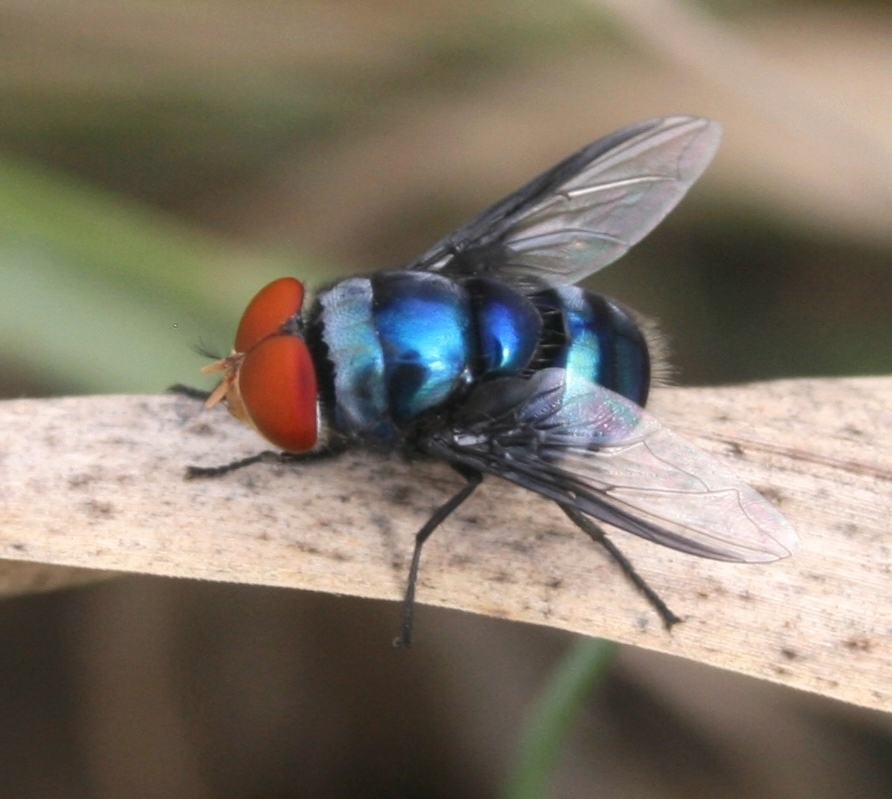
Chrysomya marginalis and other blow flies can arrive at carcasses within minutes of death.

Necrophagous flies have several traits and adaptations that facilitate their feeding behavior. For example, blow flies and flesh flies have a well-developed sense of smell and are highly mobile. This enables them to rapidly detect and locate carrion. Also, flesh flies and some blow flies lay larvae instead of eggs. This gives these flies a competitive advantage over other slower-developing, egg-laying species. In addition, blow flies, flesh flies, muscid flies and black soldier flies have many defenses against the pathogens and toxins found in carrion. These include a protective lining in their midgut, antibiotic-producing microbiota species, and a large number of pattern recognition receptors, lysozymes, antimicrobial peptides and detoxification enzymes.

The diversity and abundance of necrophagous fly species vary geographically and seasonally. For example, Chrysomya species are present in subtropical regions of the USA but are rare in most of Canada. This geographic variation is attributable to factors such as soil type and meteorological conditions, and the effects these have on carrion decomposition. Whether urbanization affects fly species richness is open to dispute. Seasonally, many necrophagous fly species are observed in higher abundance in summer, but Thyreophora cynophila is more active in winter.

Flies play a critical role in forensic science as they are often the first insects to discover and colonize human remains. Blow flies can arrive within minutes and begin laying eggs in the nose, mouth and other openings. Because adult flies very rarely deposit eggs in live hosts, the age of the developing fly larvae can be used to estimate time of death. Fly larvae can also provide information regarding cause of death because necrophagous flies deposit their eggs in any open wounds.

=== Bees ===
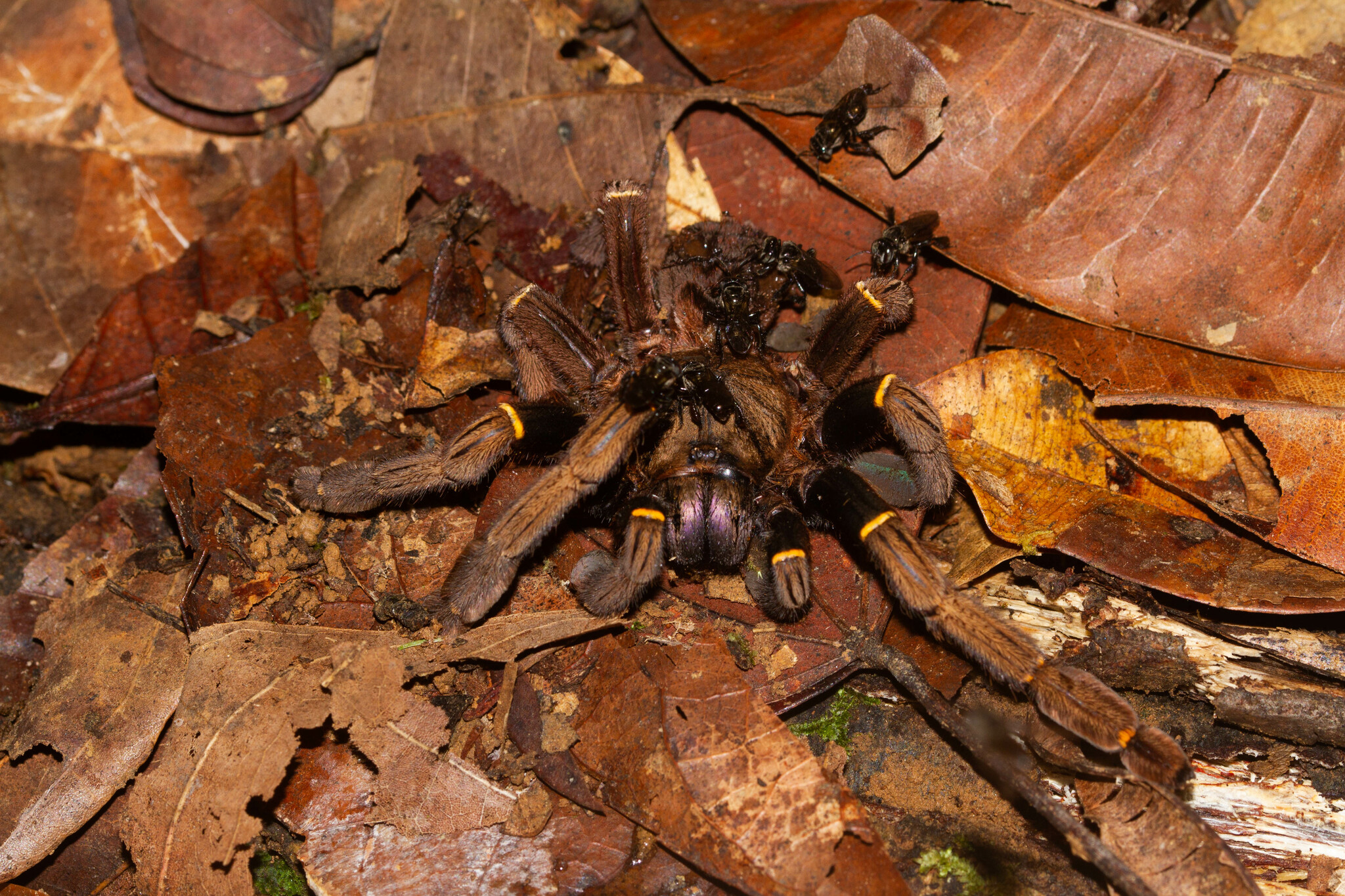
Vulture bees (Trigona crassipes) feeding on tarantula carrion.

Vulture bees are a small group of obligately necrophagous bees in the Trigona genus. Trigona worker bees play a similar role to worker bees in the Apis genus; however, along with collecting pollen, nectar, and plant resins, Trigona workers also collect carrion. Although pollen is associated with higher energy value, carrion is preferred by Trigona bees because it is biochemically easier to extract energy from. This dead animal tissue is used as a source of amino acids too.

Cerumen pots are utilized by some Trigona species, such as T. necrophaga, as vesicles to store foodstuff. The foodstuff of T. necrophaga consists of both honey and carrion from vertebrate carcasses. Ultimately, the stored food is utilized by developing larvae and the worker bee itself as a source of nutrition and energy. Due to the rapid decomposition of carrion, especially in warm temperatures, the bees must efficiently metabolize the carrion to avoid rotten carrion in their cerumen pots.

Trigona hypogea communicate the presence of a valuable carcass through olfactory signals. The bees create an odour trail between their nest and the prospective animal carcass; thus, the bees recruit the other nest members to respond and exploit the corpse's resources rapidly. Additionally, interspecific competition is observed in Trigona hypogea bees. The bees are observed to defend their colonized food item, including but not limited to a monkey, lizard, fish, or snake carcass, from competing necrophages, such as flies.

=== Beetles ===
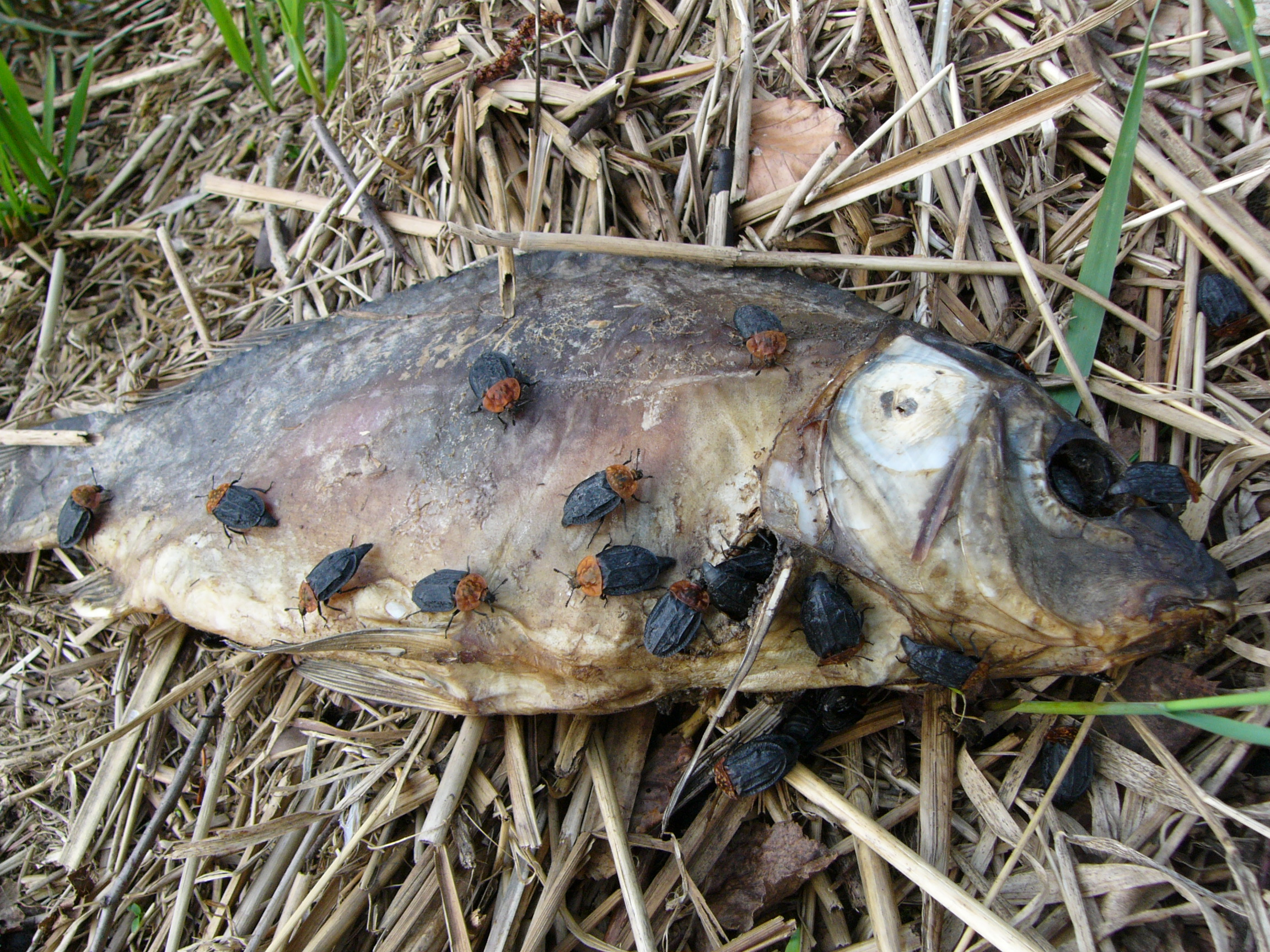
Red-breasted carrion beetles, a species of silphine beetle, feeding on fish carrion.

Numerous beetles in the Nicrophorus genus are obligately necrophagous, for example Nicrophorus americanus and N. vespilloides. Many other beetles are facultative necrophages including checkered beetles, dermestid beetles, diving beetles, scarab beetles, silphine beetles and water scavenger beetles. Types of carrion eaten include wildlife, livestock and poultry carcasses, livestock viscera and human bodies.

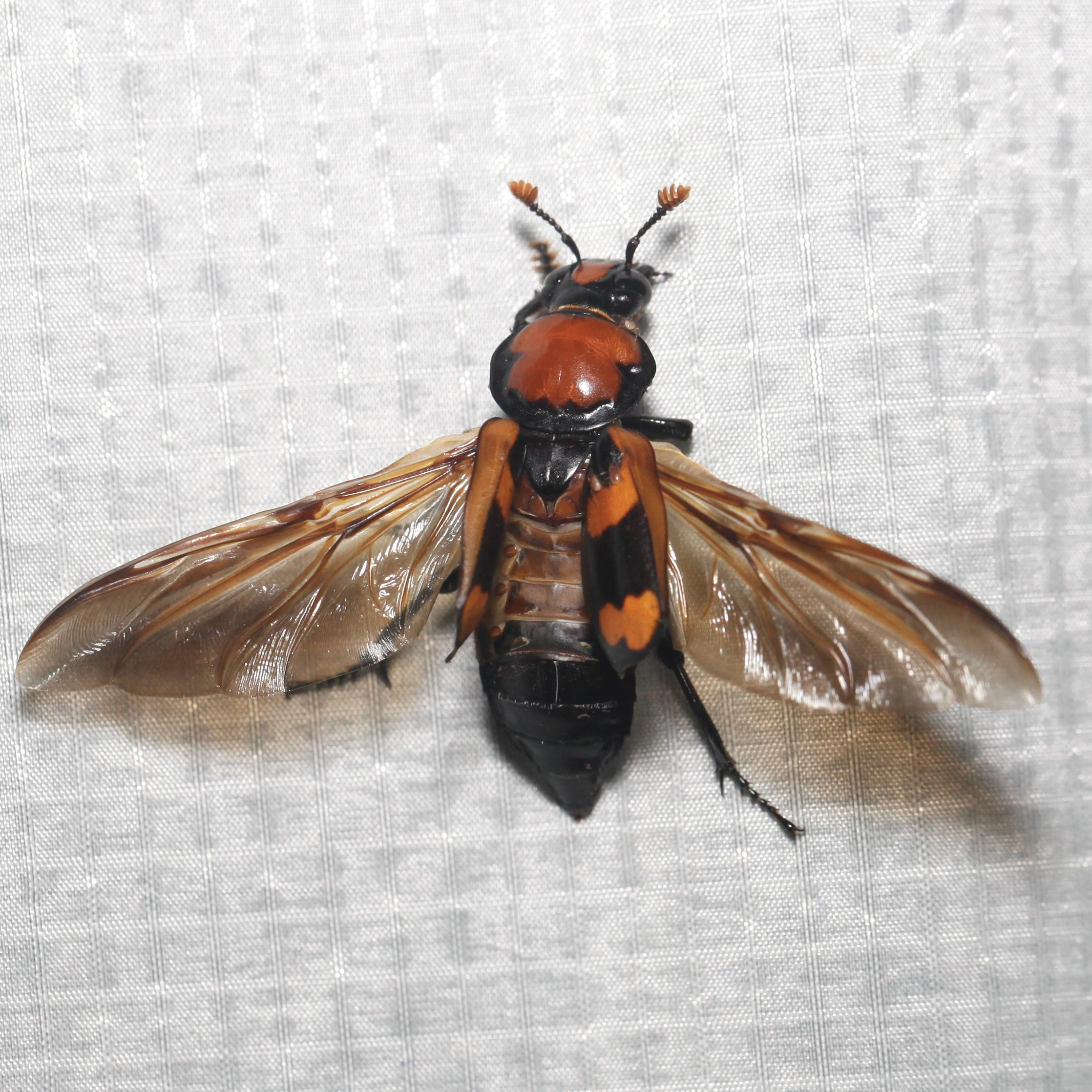
Nicrophorus americanus, the American burying beetle, with its wings spread before flight.

Necrophagous beetles have evolved many diet-related adaptations. For example, Nicrophorus species have specialized olfactory sensors on their antennae to help them detect carrion. These sensors are sensitive to dimethyl sulphide and other sulfur-containing compounds emitted by bodies after death. Also, Nicrophorus, Necrodes and other necrophagous silphine beetle species are flight-capable, making it easier for them to reach carrion. Nicrophorus and Dermestes species have many defenses against dietary pathogens and toxins too. These include physical traits such as protective gut linings, antibacterial lectins and lysozymes, mutualistic relationships with microbiota bacteria, and behavioral traits such as preferentially selecting fresh carcasses and smearing carcasses with antibacterial and toxin-degrading exudates. Given the often-limited availability of carrion, the ability of these beetles to share this resource with other beetles and defend it against flies and ants is also an advantage.

Regarding food preferences and the logistics of carrion use, N. vespilloides and other burying beetles favor small carcasses (e.g. rodents and small birds) as these are easier to transport, clean and conceal from competitors. Diving beetles, scarab beetles and water scavenger beetles have all been observed feeding on amphibian carrion (e.g. granular toads and tree frogs). The scarab beetle Scybalocanthon nigriceps uses its front legs and clypeus to shape frog carrion into pellets for eventual consumption. Other scarab beetles, for example, Coprophanaeus ensifer, build their burrows near carcasses for easier transportation of carrion pieces to offspring.

Beetles that feed on human remains are important in forensic science. Terrestrial beetles such as checkered beetles and dermestid beetles colonize bodies in a predictable sequence and have well-characterized life cycles, so they can sometimes be used to estimate time of death. Aquatic beetles are less useful for estimating time of death but can cause physical damage to submerged bodies that must be distinguished from inflicted injuries when determining cause of death. For example, the facultatively necrophagous diving beetle Meridiorhantus validus creates postmortem channels and chambers in human bodies that must be differentiated from antemortem piercing injuries.

=== Marine snails ===
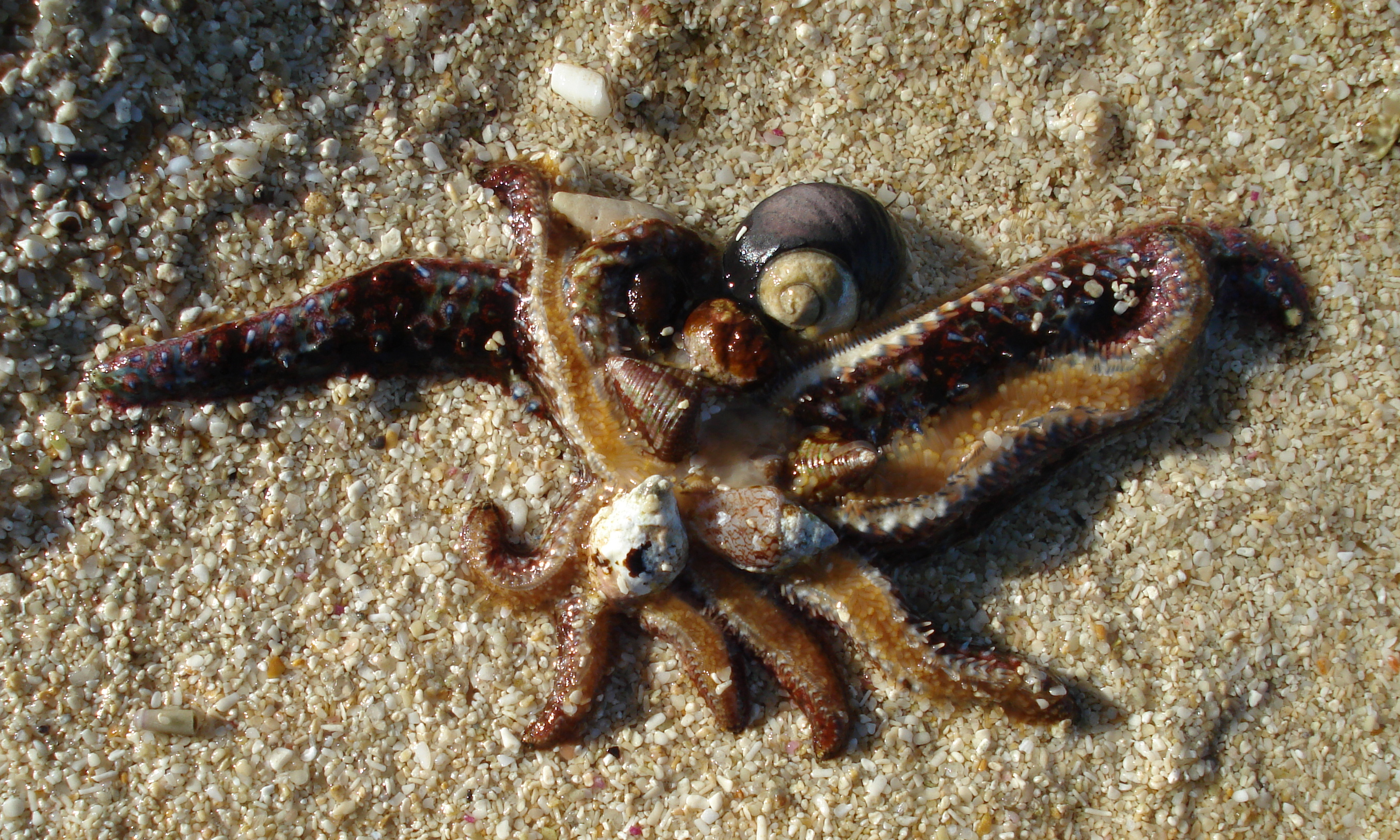
Necrophagous snails feeding on starfish carrion.

The Nassa mud snails, Nassarius festivus and Nassarius clarus, scavenge on dead and decaying animal matter in the intertidal zone of eulittoral soft shores. At Shark Bay in Australia, Nassarius clarus feeds on the carrion of fishes and bivalves. In the presence of carrion, the animal's proboscis performs a search reaction followed by a quick onset of feeding. When faced with a competitor, such as a hermit crab, at the site of the carrion, the Nassarius clarus attack the competition to defend their meal. Nassarius clarus are attracted to fish and bivalve carrion to a distance of 26 meters and have a heightened interest in areas where the sand has been disturbed; thus, indicating the potential presence of organic detritus or damaged fauna.

Whelks such as Buccinum undatum, rock snails such as Dicathais orbita, olive snails such as Oliva sayana, and the bone-eating Rubyspira snails are also necrophagous.

=== Other marine invertebrates ===
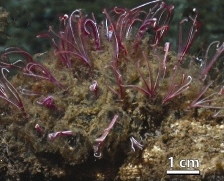
The zombie worm, Osedax frankpressi, feeds on whale bones.

Many marine invertebrates feed on carrion including cephalopods (e.g. Octopus vulgaris), hermit crabs (e.g. Coenobita perlatus), squat lobsters (e.g. Munida tenuimana), star fish (e.g. Asterias rubens), sea anemones (e.g. Actinoscyphia aurelia), amphipods (e.g. Eurythenes gryllus), annelids (e.g. zombie worms), and ribbon worms (e.g. Parborlasia corrugatus). Types of carrion consumed include dead seals, pilchards, jellyfish and tunicates, bones from whale falls, and fishery discards such as whiting and langoustine.

Marine necrophages are less useful in forensic science than terrestrial necrophages. This is partly because human deaths occur less frequently in marine settings than terrestrial settings, and partly because human remains are less likely to be recovered in marine settings. In addition, in any aquatic system, there are a large number of environmental and biological factors that can confound calculation of minimum post-mortem interval. These include current and wave action, water temperature, oxygen concentration, and a greater diversity of necrophagous organisms colonizing the remains.

== Vertebrates ==
=== Vultures ===
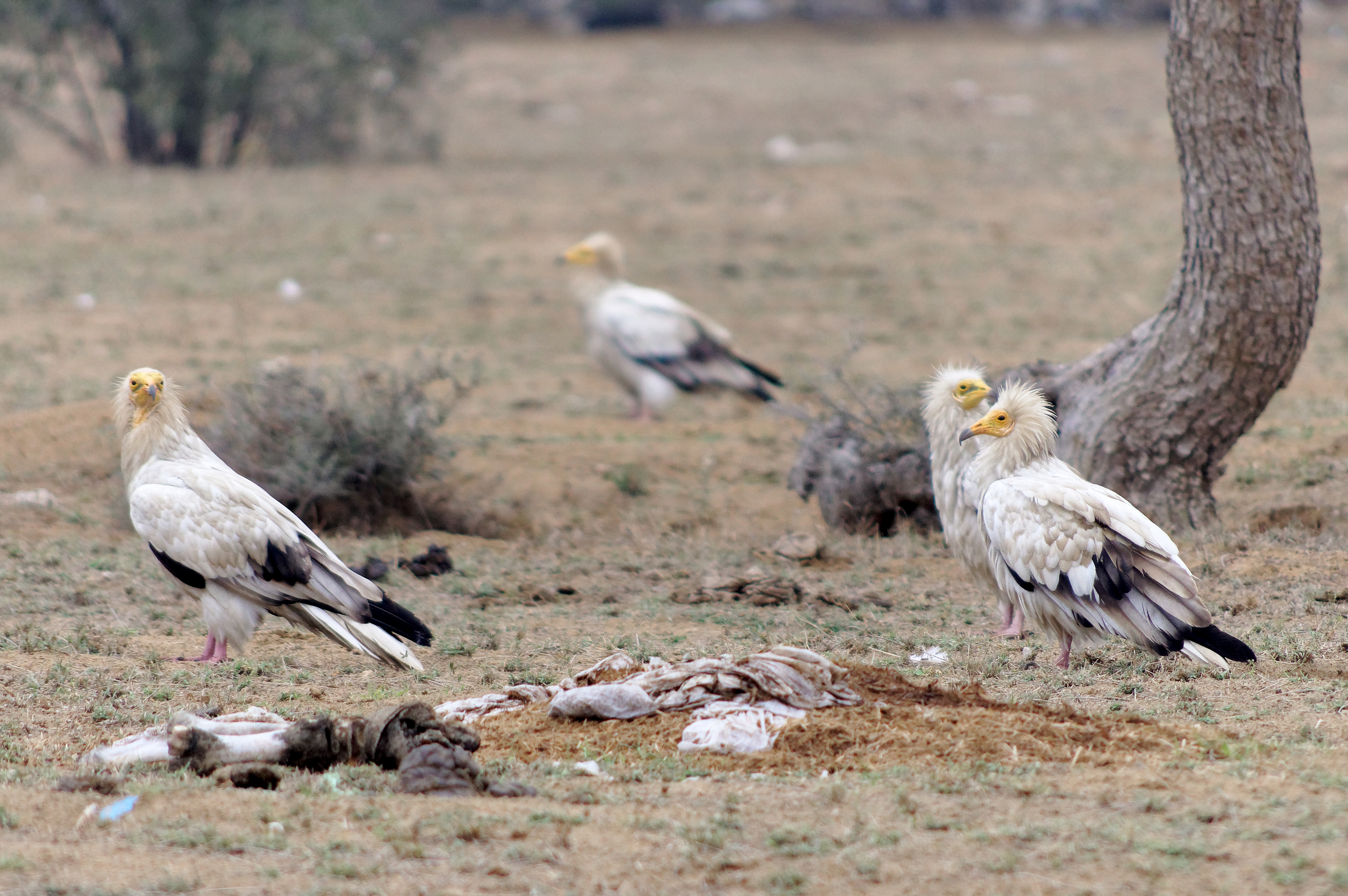
Egyptian vultures (Neophron percnopterus) surrounding a mammalian carcass.

Many vulture species are obligately necrophagous including the bearded vulture, black vulture, cinereous vulture, Eurasian griffon, Himalayan vulture, king vulture and turkey vulture. Types of carrion fed upon include dead wildlife, livestock, poultry and companion animals, human remains (sky burial), hunting discards, slaughterhouse offal and roadkill. Typically, muscle tissue is consumed, but bearded vultures feed on bones and bone marrow. In addition to eating carrion, Egyptian vultures feed on small live animals such as turtles, eggs and rotting fruit.

Vultures have many adaptations that help them detect, locate and consume carrion. For example, all vultures have keen eyesight, and New World vultures have a highly developed sense of smell. Hooded vultures also have excellent auditory perception, enabling them to hear distant predation-related noises and the distress calls of dying animals. In addition, gliding flight enables vultures to cover long distances to reach carrion, strong beaks allow vultures to cut through thick animal skin, and strong immune defenses protect vultures from pathogens in carrion. Given the inherently unpredictable and ephemeral nature of carrion as a food source, the ability of vultures to survive long periods between meals is also advantageous.

Some human activities have had an adverse impact on vultures in Sicily, the Azerbaijan Republic and other countries. For example, changes in farming practices such as the indoor raising of cattle and incineration or burial of cattle carcasses have reduced food availability for Eurasian griffon vultures. Shootings of birds, removal of nestlings from nests, and drug pollution have also contributed to declines in vulture populations.

=== Other birds ===
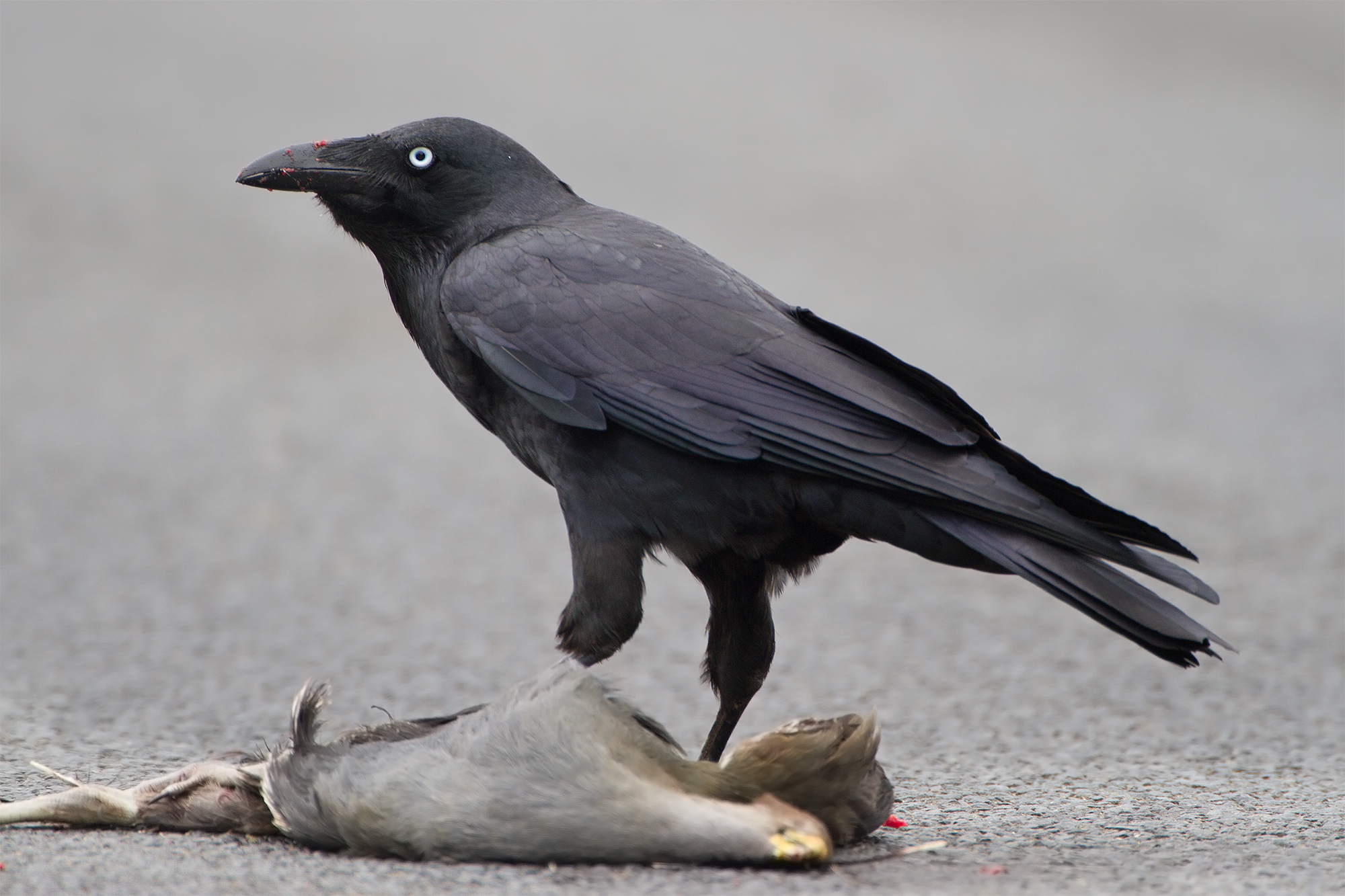
A forest raven (Corvus tasmanicus) feeding on roadkill.

Although vultures are the only birds that depend on carrion for food, many other birds eat carrion opportunistically. Numerous birds of prey, for example wedge-tailed eagles, brown goshawks and buzzards, feed on carrion. Long-eared owls and great horned owls also feed on carrion, as do wading birds such as the marabou stork and greater adjutant, seabirds such as the northern giant petrel and ivory gull, and passerine birds such as the carrion crow, rook and forest raven. Types of carrion eaten include dead wildlife, dead livestock, roadkill, and carrion stolen from vultures or raided from crocodile caches.

=== Monitor lizards ===
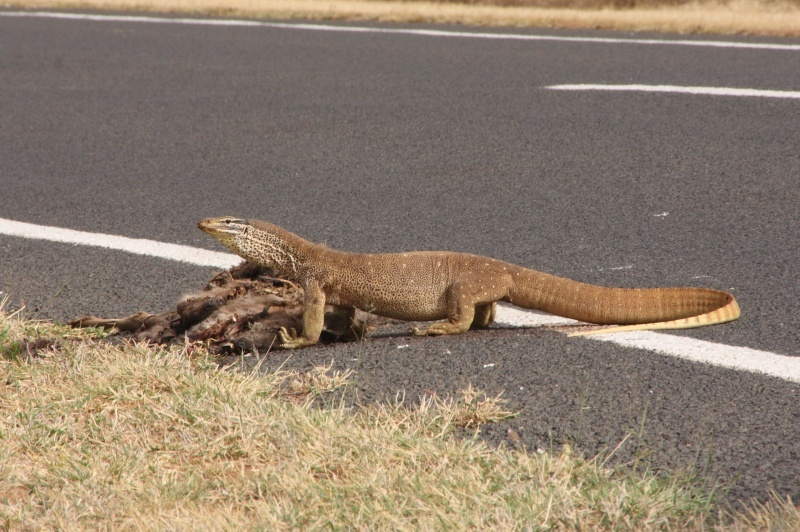
A yellow-spotted monitor (Varanus panoptes) feeding on roadkill.

Many species of monitor lizard are facultatively necrophagous. For example, Indian monitors, Komodo dragons and lace monitors feed on dead fish, heath monitors feed on marsupial carrion, and yellow-spotted monitors feed on carrion raided from crocodile caches. Komodo dragons also feed on human remains. On the island of Komodo, villagers had to move their graves from sandy to clay ground, and pile rocks on top of them, to stop lizards digging up and eating the bodies there.

=== Coyotes, wolves and other canids ===
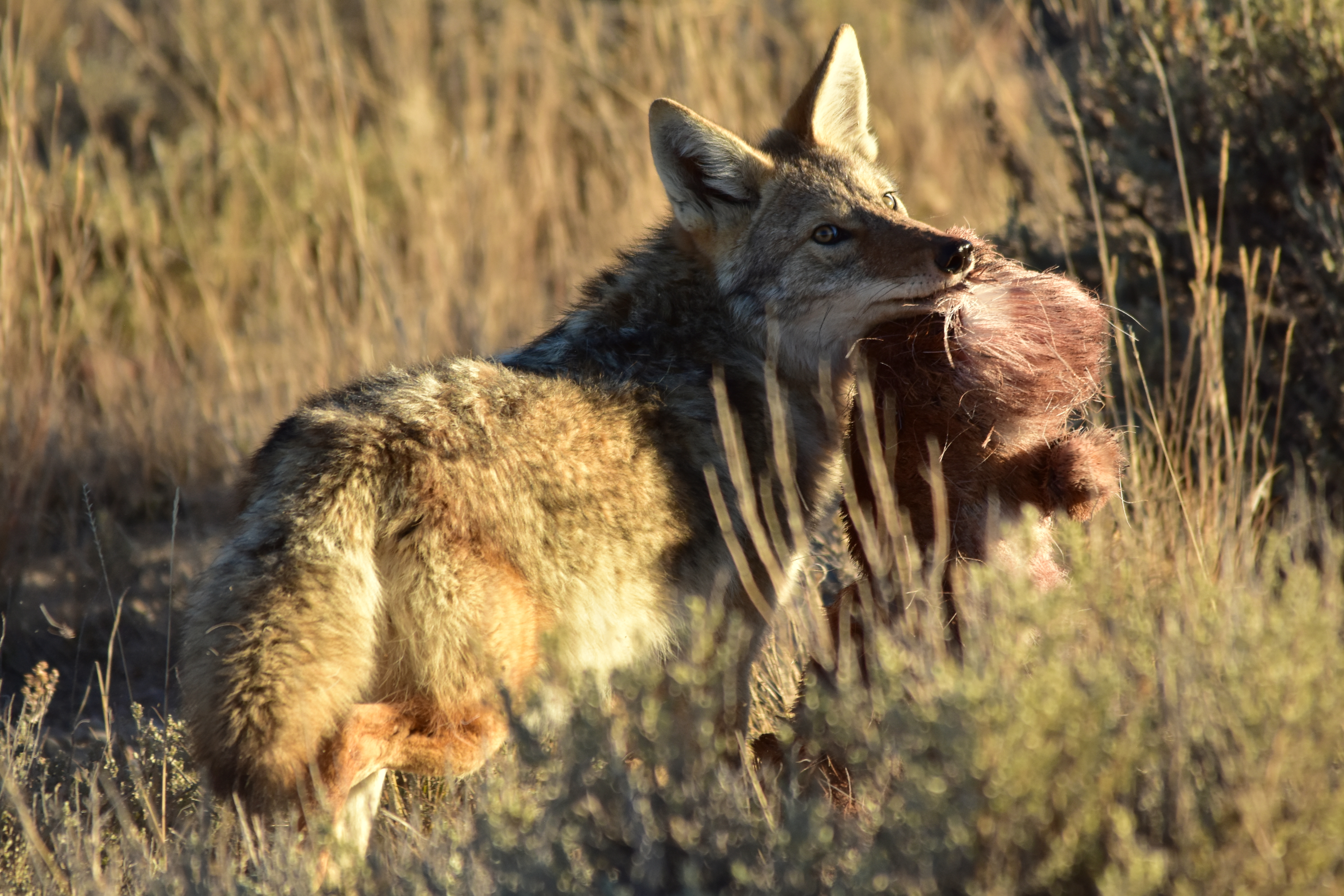
A coyote (Canis latrans) feeding on pronghorn carrion.

Many canids feed opportunistically on carrion. Examples include foxes such as the Arctic fox, corsac fox, gray fox, kit fox and red fox, hyenas such as the brown hyena, spotted hyena and striped hyena, black-backed jackals and golden jackals, as well as coyotes, culpeos, dingoes, gray wolves, Pampas zorros, and raccoon dogs. Types of carrion fed upon ranges from dead wildlife and dead livestock to abandoned predator kills and hunting discards.

Anatomically and immunologically, canids are well-adapted to carrion feeding. For example, gray wolves hold food in their stomachs for at least twice as long as humans and other primates. This gives their gastric acid longer to kill pathogens before they enter the small intestine. The intestinal tracts of canids are also much shorter than those of primates, so pathogens have less time to multiply and cause disease prior to their expulsion. Anti-botulinum antibodies are an additional antibacterial defense detected in coyotes.

=== Possums, quolls and Tasmanian devils ===
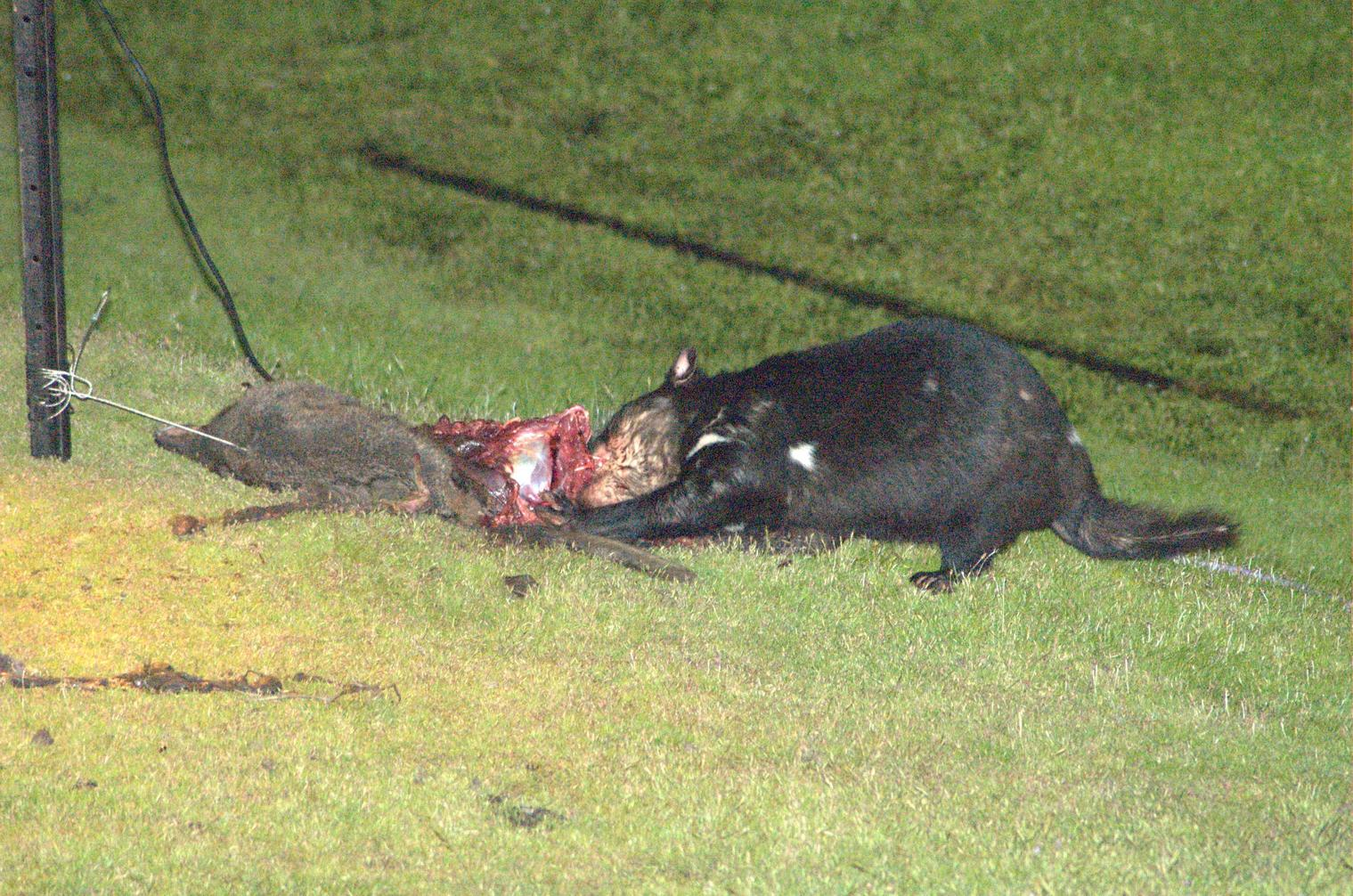
A Tasmanian devil (Sarcophilus harrisii) feeding on wallaby carrion.

Possums, quolls and Tasmanian devils are facultatively necrophagous. For example, brushtail possums feed opportunistically on wild boar, kangaroo, pademelon and deer carrion, spotted-tailed quolls feed on kangaroo and pademelon carrion, and Tasmanian devils feed on possum, wallaby, kangaroo, wombat and pademelon carrion. Historically, quolls have also fed on human remains.

Pademelon carrion is eaten frequently by Australian necrophages as pademelons are common in farming areas there, and often end up as roadkill.

Brushtail possums eat carrion mostly in winter. This may be because there is less competition from necrophagous insects in winter, or because other food items such as leaves and fruit are more difficult to find. Quolls are also thought to scavenge mostly in winter, perhaps because they are hungriest in winter or because carrion is more readily available in winter.

=== Hagfish ===
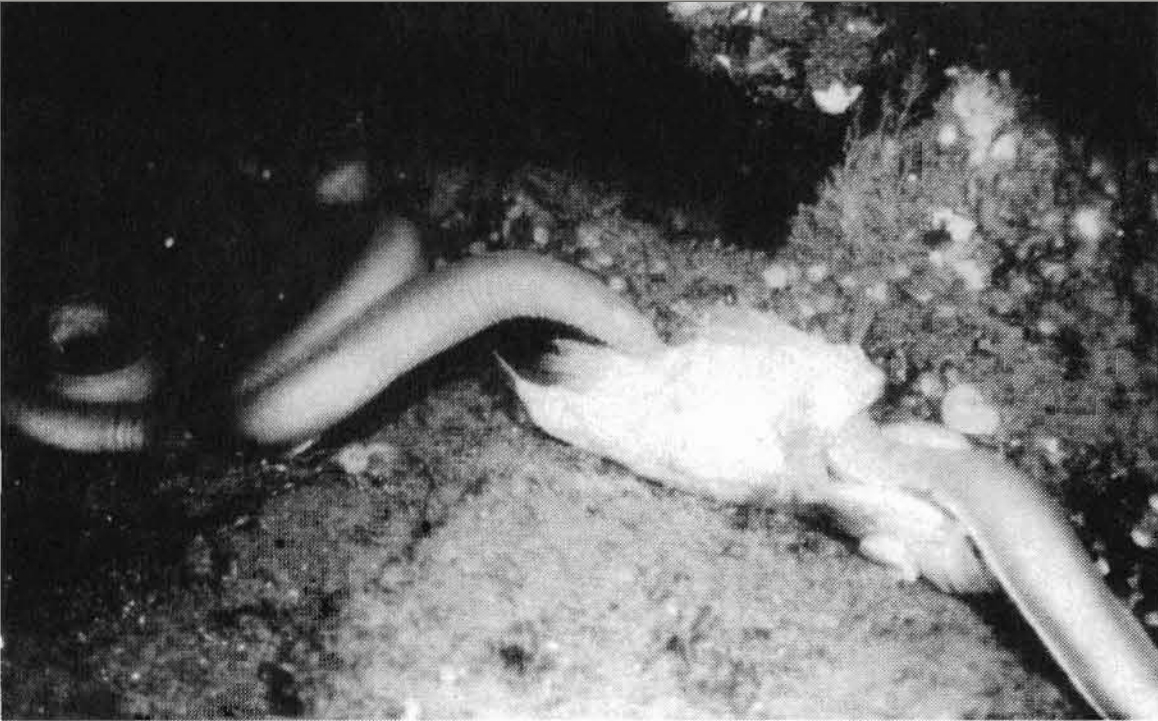
Two Pacific hagfish (Eptatretus stoutii) feeding on rockfish carrion.

Numerous species of hagfish feed on carrion, including Atlantic hagfish, black hagfish, blueband hagfish, Pacific hagfish, slender hagfish and whiteface hagfish. Types of carrion eaten include dead whales, hake, mackerel, pilchards and jellyfish, as well as fishery discards of whiting and langoustine.

Hagfish are highly adapted to carrion feeding. For example, they are able to survive extended periods without eating and can detect carrion from long distances. Hagfish are also highly mobile and can arrive at carcasses within minutes or hours of an animal’s death. Immune defenses such as lysozyme-containing slime and antimicrobial proteins (e.g. myxinidin) are thought to protect hagfish from microbial pathogens.

== Current roles and uses ==
=== Maggot therapy ===
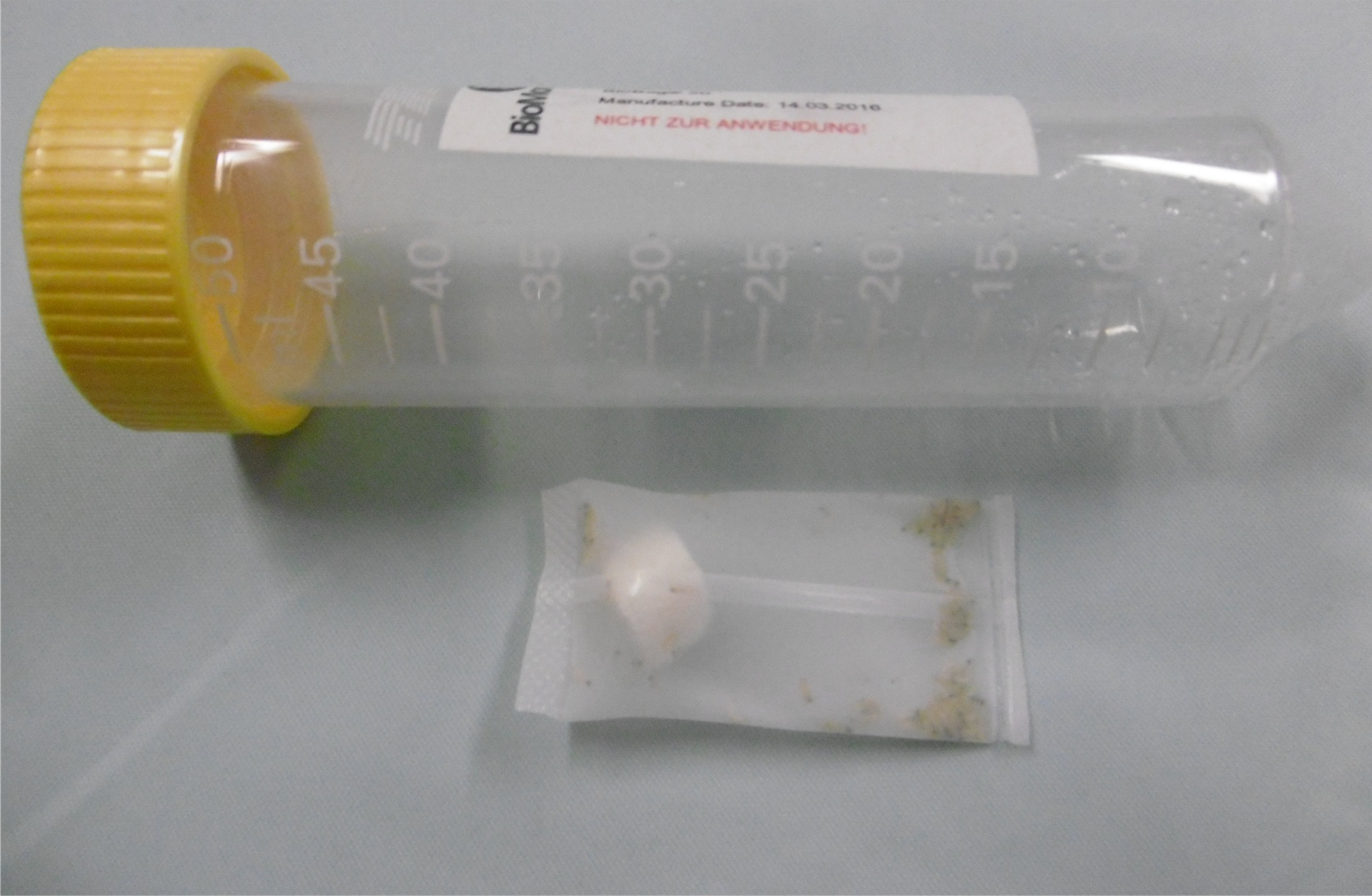
Green bottle fly larvae in medical packaging.

In maggot debridement therapy, sterile, medical-grade larvae of the necrophagous fly Lucilia sericata are used to eliminate necrotic (dead) tissue from non-healing skin and soft-tissue wounds. This is important as dead tissue can facilitate bacterial growth, impede wound healing, and reduce the effectiveness of topical medications. Physicians may administer the fly larvae directly to skin and soft tissue wounds or indirectly within a sealed mesh bag. Larvae then debride the wound by digesting, liquefying and consuming the dead tissue. The US Food and Drug Administration (FDA) have cleared Lucilia sericata larvae for use as a "medical device" in the US to debride several types of wound including pressure ulcers, neuropathic foot ulcers, and nonhealing surgical wounds.

=== Forensic entomology ===
Necrophagous flies and beetles play an important role in forensic entomology due to their postmortem colonization of human remains. For example, in homicide cases, forensic medical examiners can sometimes determine the minimum post-mortem interval based on the fly and beetle species present in the body and their development stage. This is because these insects rarely deposit eggs in live hosts, they colonize bodies in a predictable sequence following death, and information is available on how long it takes different species to reach different stages of development. Because insect arrival and departure time and larval development time are affected by seasonal changes, temperature, moisture levels, air exposure, geographical region, and other factors, these must all be carefully considered when estimating minimum post-mortem interval.

=== Waste management ===
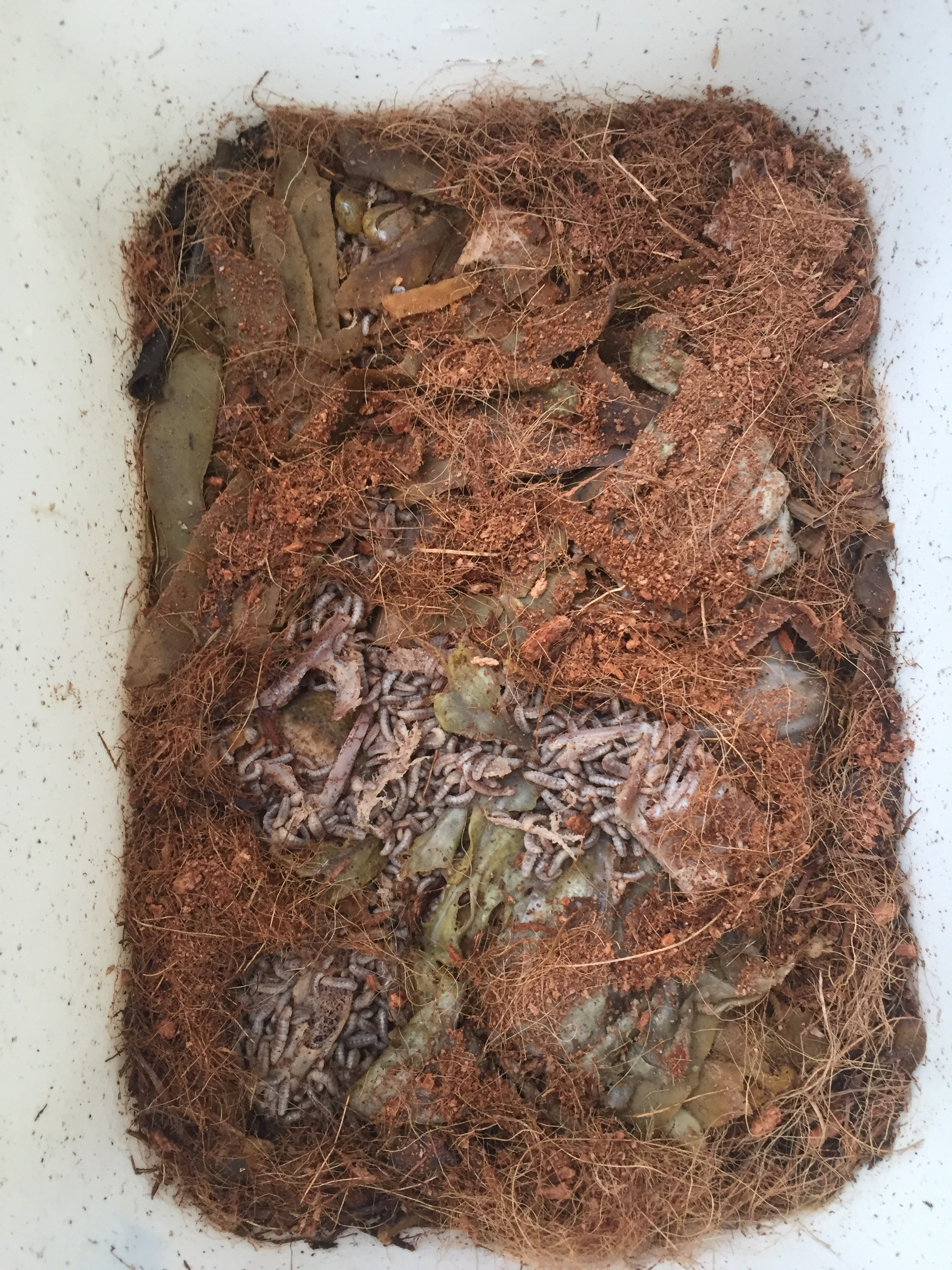
Black soldier fly larvae feeding on duck meat scraps and bones.

In some countries, the black soldier fly, Hermetia illucens, is used to process food industry by-products and food waste. Hermetia illucens is a facultative necrophage and can grow on a wide range of decomposing organic substrates including those of animal origin (e.g. abattoir waste), plant origin (e.g. almond hulls), and a mix of both (e.g. meat, fish and vegetable food waste). Fly larvae are grown on this organic waste and then used as livestock feed or fish feed. The frass generated by the larvae can be used as soil fertilizer too. This waste conversion process, known as bioconversion, has several advantages. It reduces the greenhouse gas emissions caused by microbial decomposition of food waste in landfills (e.g. methane), it generates high-quality protein for feeding livestock, and it generates low-cost fertilizer for crop cultivation.

=== Skeleton preparation ===
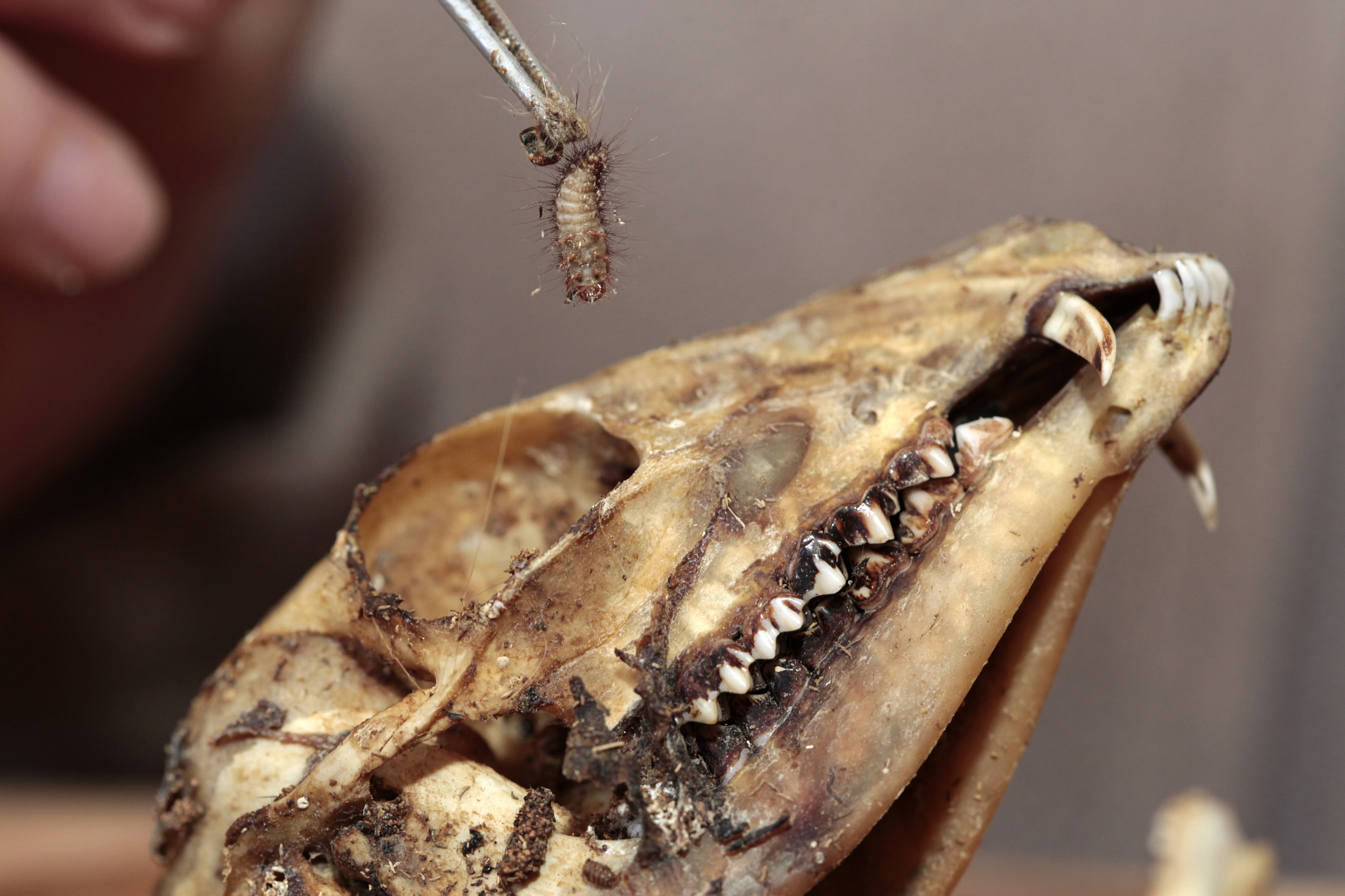
Dermestid beetle larvae being used to clean the flesh off a museum specimen.

In natural history museums, researchers and curators sometimes wish to study or display animal skeletons. In the Natural History Museum in London, the American Museum of Natural History in New York, and the Australian National Wildlife Collection in Canberra, dermestid beetles are used for skeleton preparation. Dermestid beetles eat hair, skin and flesh, but not bones, and are considered an excellent way of creating clean, professional-grade bone specimens.

=== Sky burial ===
In Tibet and other parts of Asia, necrophagous birds play a central role in a traditional funeral practice called sky burial. Funerals begin with monks chanting mantra and burning juniper incense, and the funeral party carrying the deceased to a large fenced mountain meadow. In this meadow, the body is then cut apart by sky burial masters, and vultures move in to eat it. Other birds and animals, for example magpies and ravens, eat any leftover tissue.

== Other possible uses ==
=== Drug and biomaterial development ===
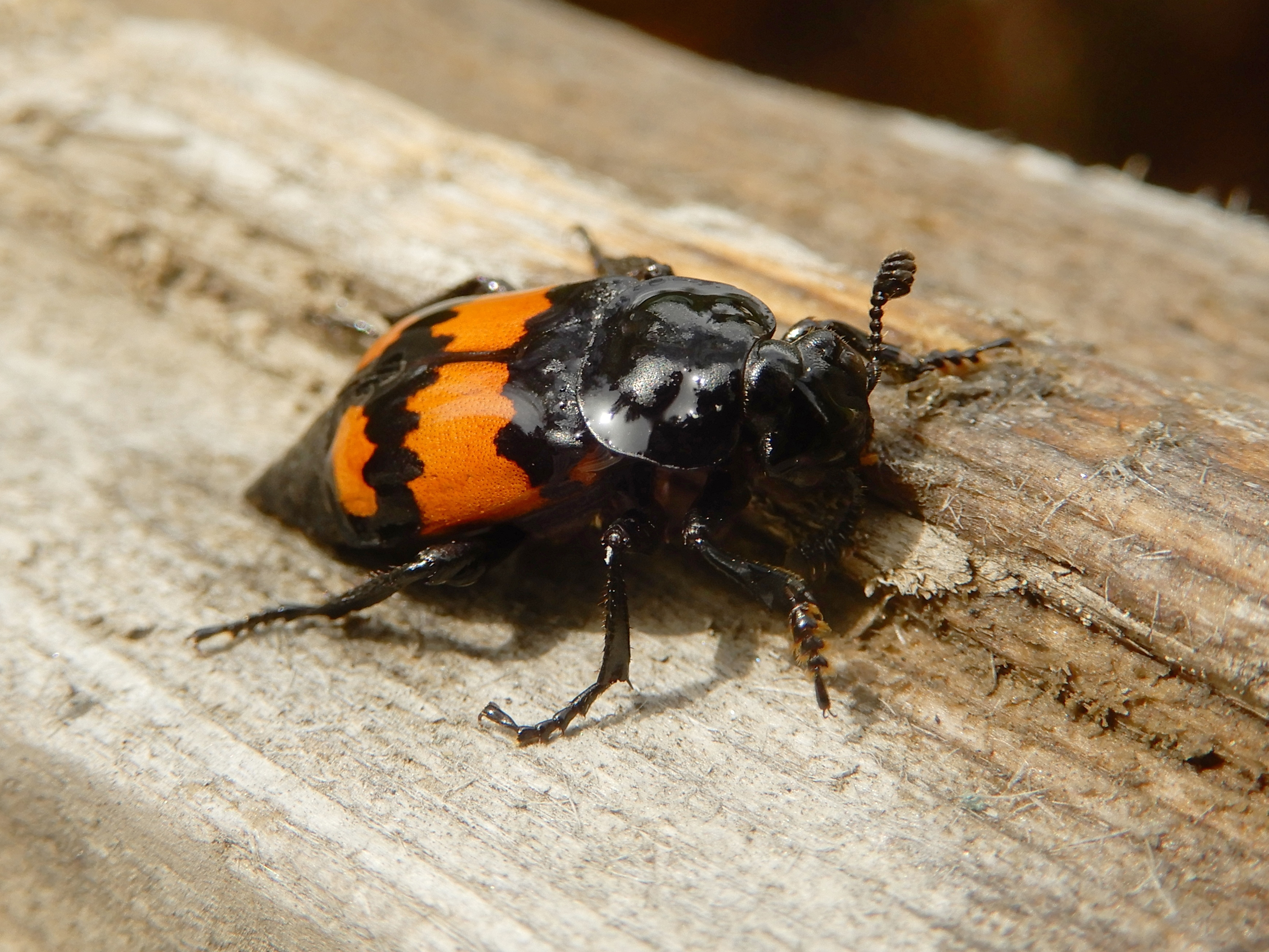
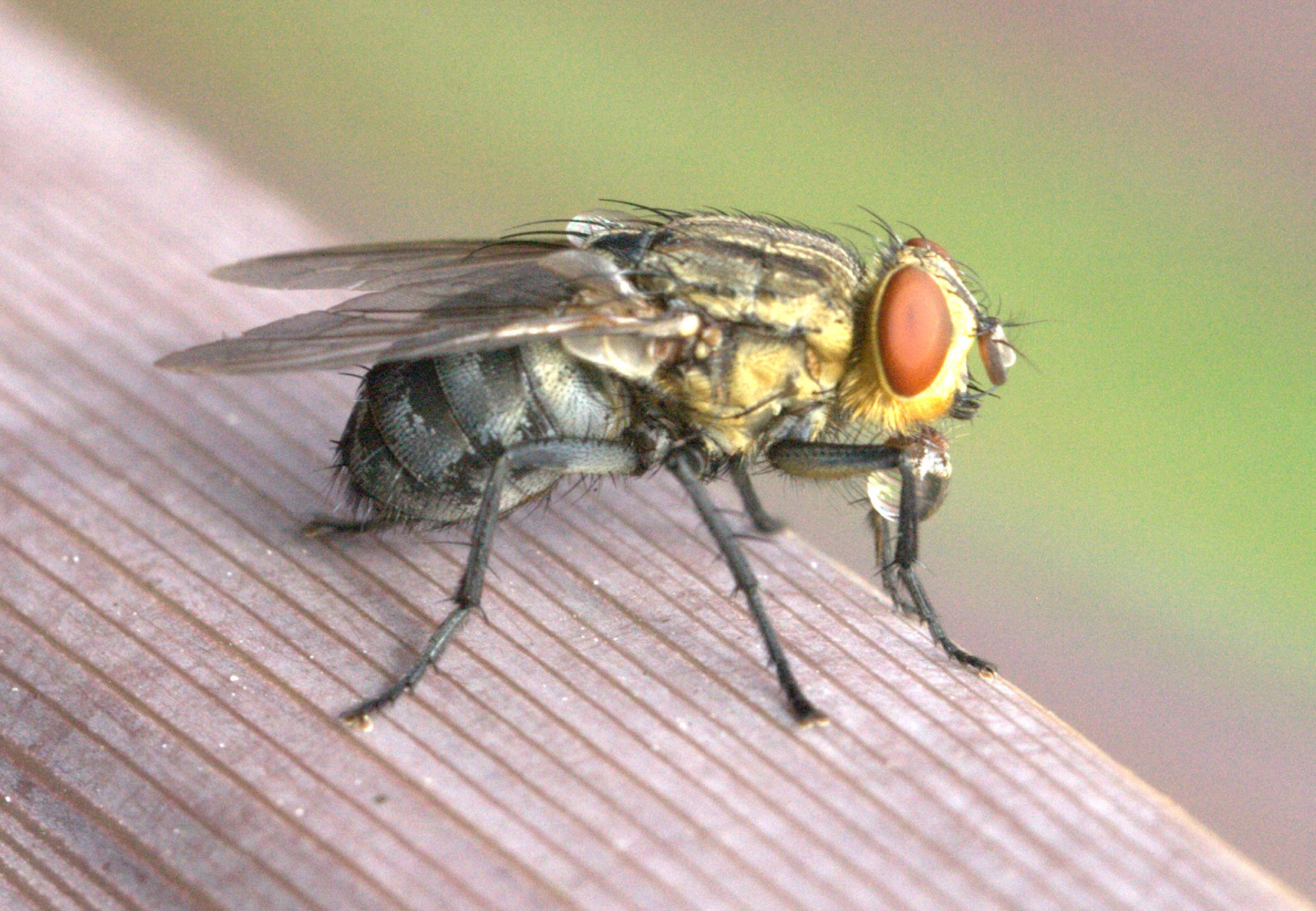
Antibiotic-producing bacteria have been discovered in the gut microbiotas of burying beetles and flesh flies.

Necrophages and their microbiotas ("friendly bacteria") produce several molecules of medical interest. These include molecules that can bind to bacterial pathogens (e.g. lectins), inhibit pathogen growth (e.g. chitin, cyclic lipopeptides), and kill pathogens (e.g. antimicrobial peptides, lysozymes). In nature, these molecules are thought to block pathogen entry into the integuments (e.g. skin, cuticle) and circulatory systems (e.g. blood, hemolymph) of necrophages, and enable the immune systems of necrophages to detect, inhibit and kill any pathogens that breach these barriers. Research is underway in Germany, China, the USA and other countries to develop these molecules for use in medicine. Possible applications include antimicrobial wound dressings, antibacterial drugs, and drug delivery systems for bacterial infections.

=== Crop development ===
Given the enormous damage that citrus canker, citrus greening, bacterial soft rot and wildfire disease cause to food and cash crops each year, there is interest in developing new plant varieties that are more resistant to infection. One possible solution is to enhance the natural defenses of crops using antimicrobial peptides. Necrophagous insects are a rich source of these peptides, and transgenic research in Japan, the USA, and Brazil has shown that sarcotoxin IA (from Sarcophaga peregrina) can help protect orange trees and other crops.

== Image and video gallery ==
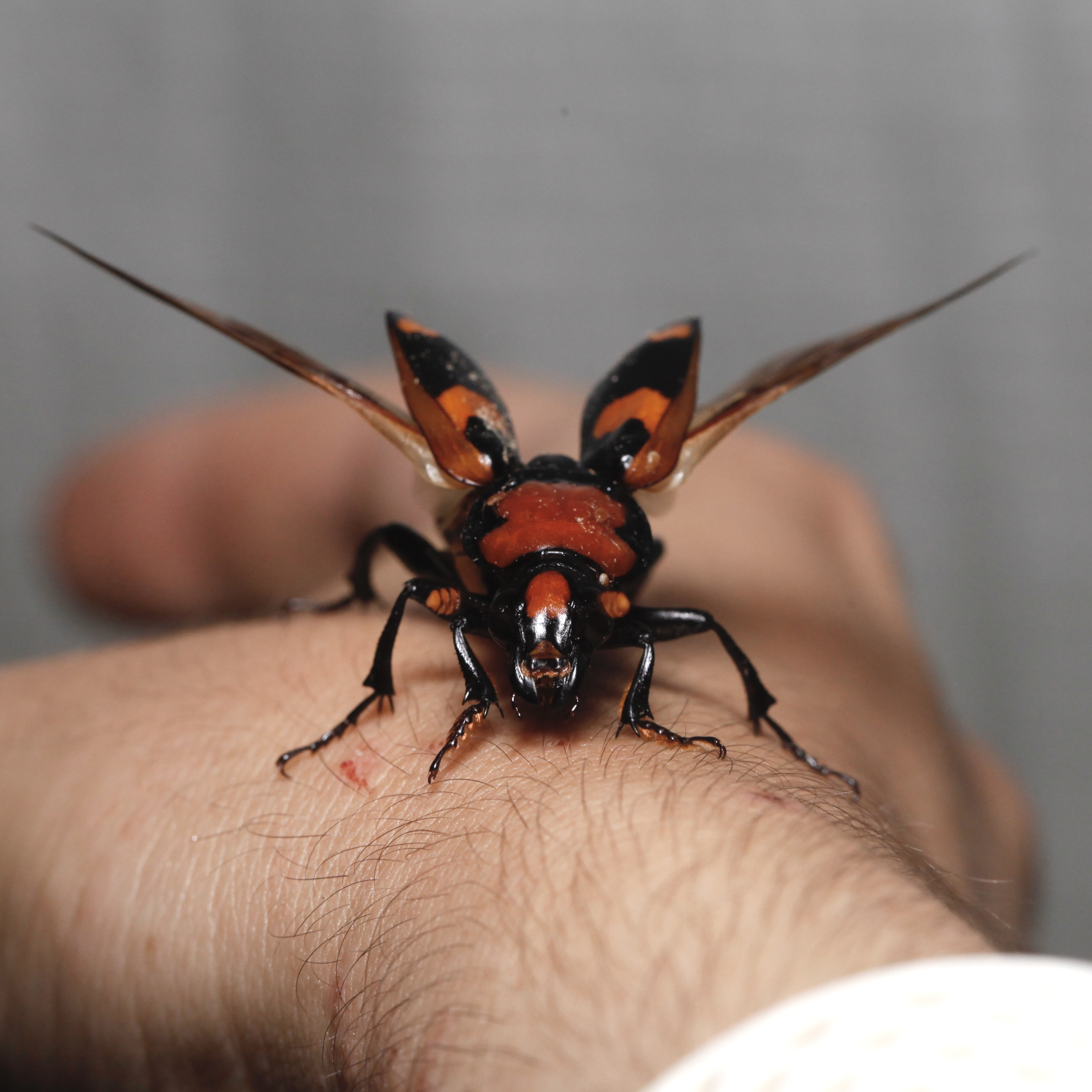
An American burying beetle about to take flight.

An American carrion beetle feeding on vole carrion.

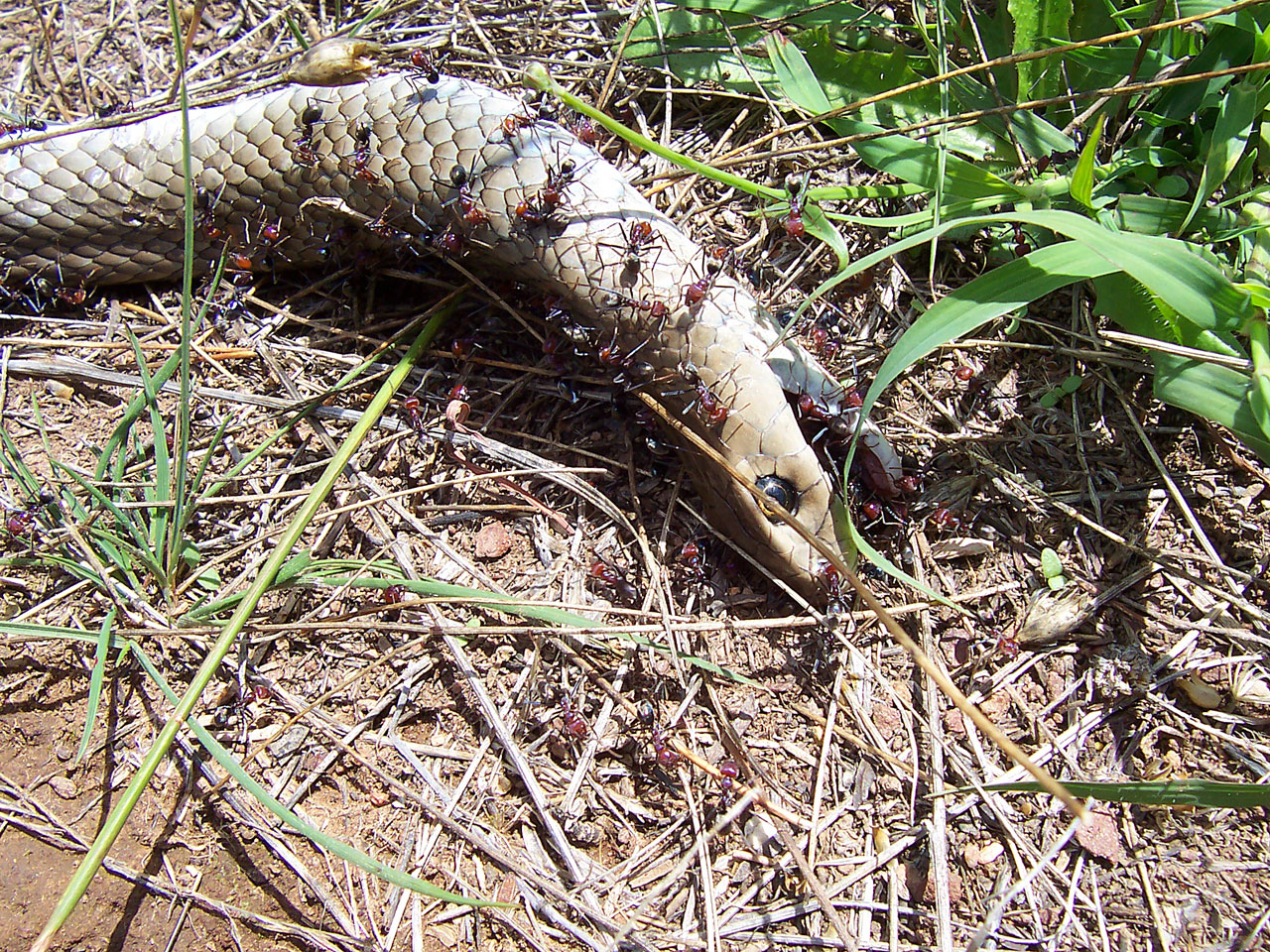
Ants feeding on brown snake carrion.

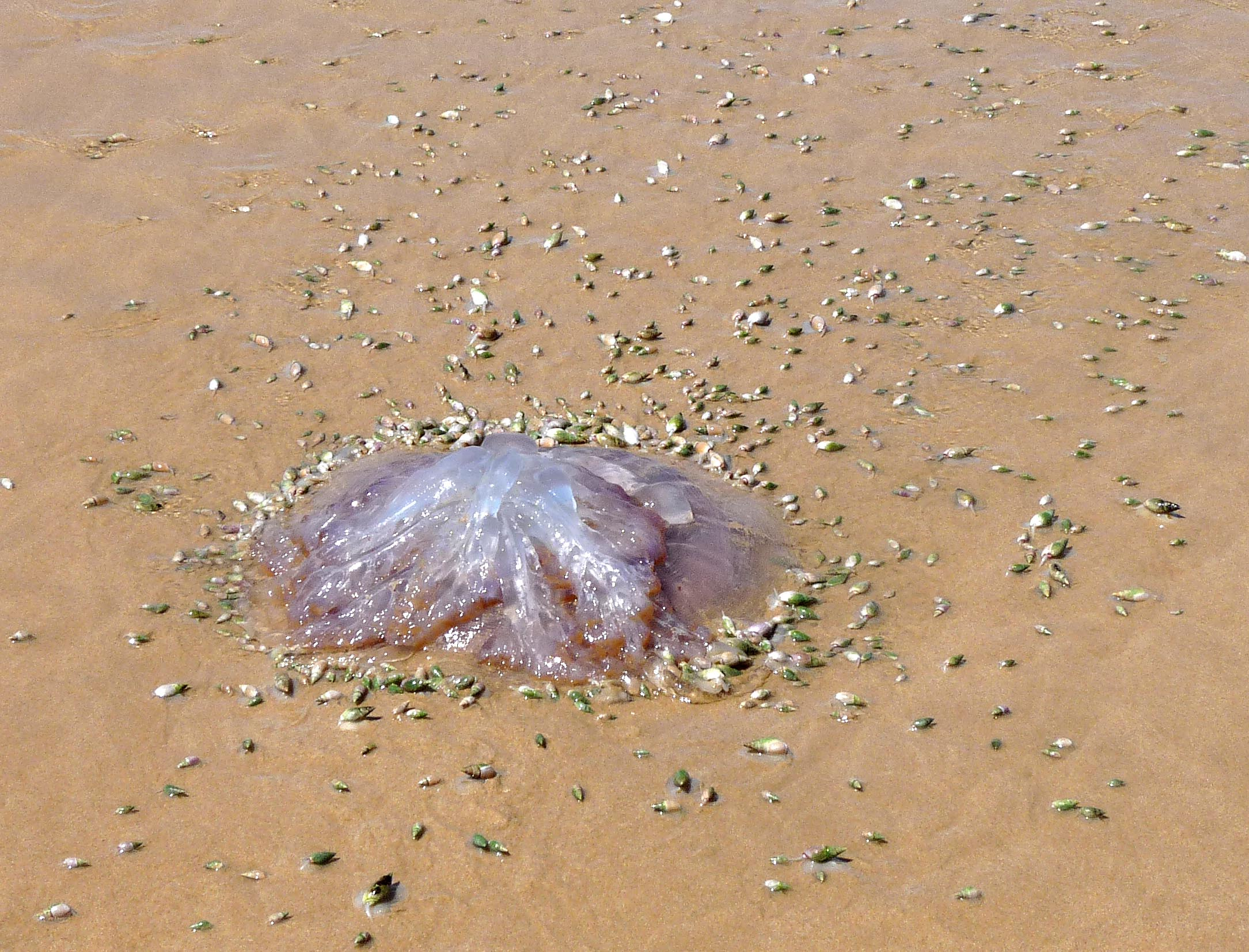
Marine snails feeding on jellyfish carrion.

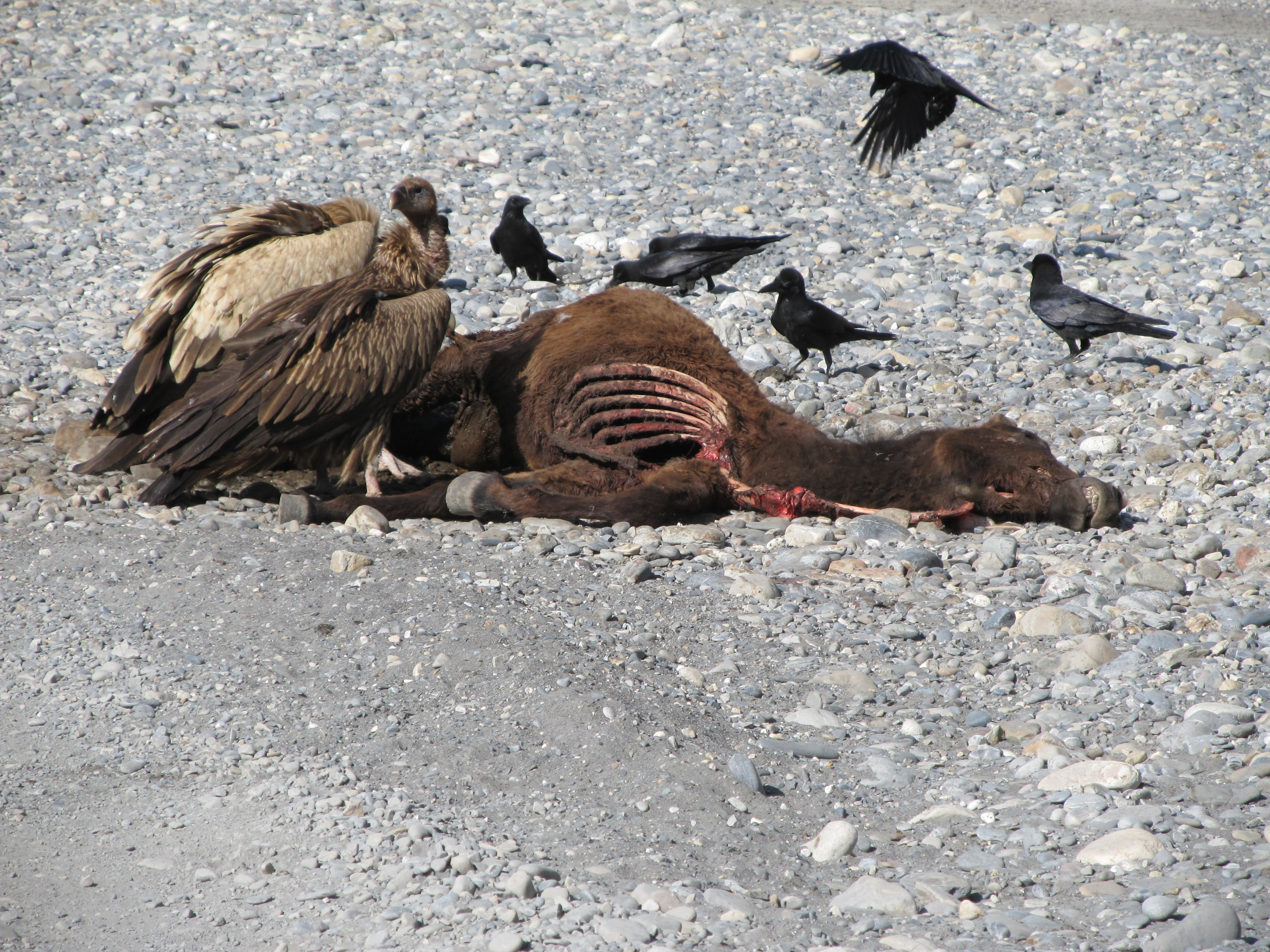
Himalayan vulture and large-billed crows feeding on a dead mule.

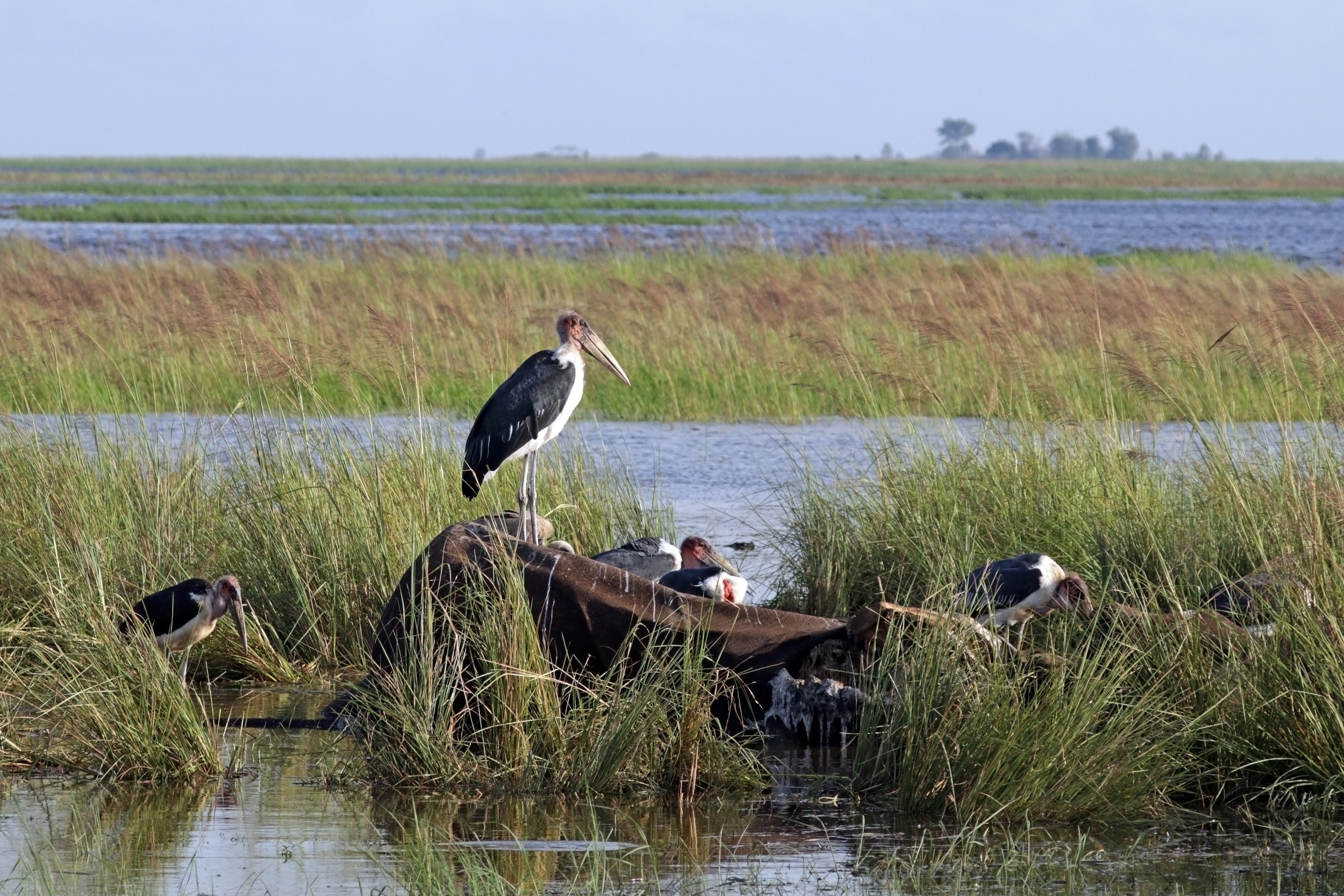
Marabou storks feeding on an elephant carcass.

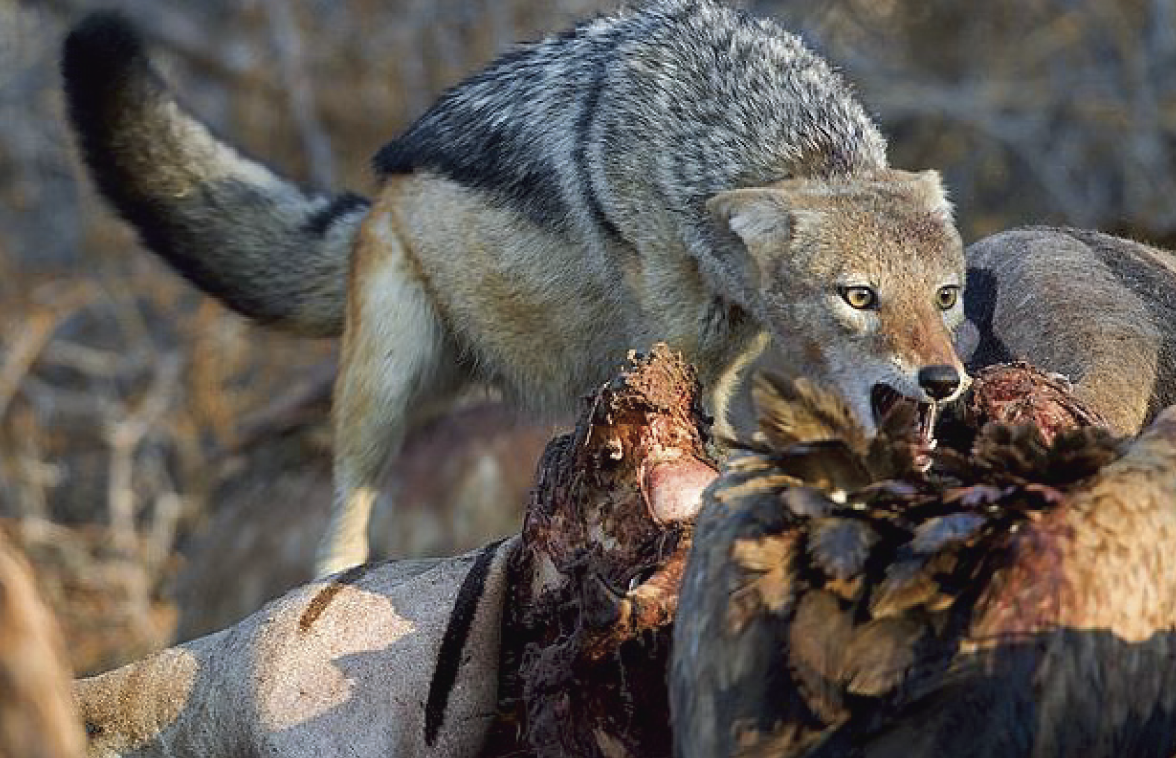
A black-backed jackal feeding on zebra carrion.

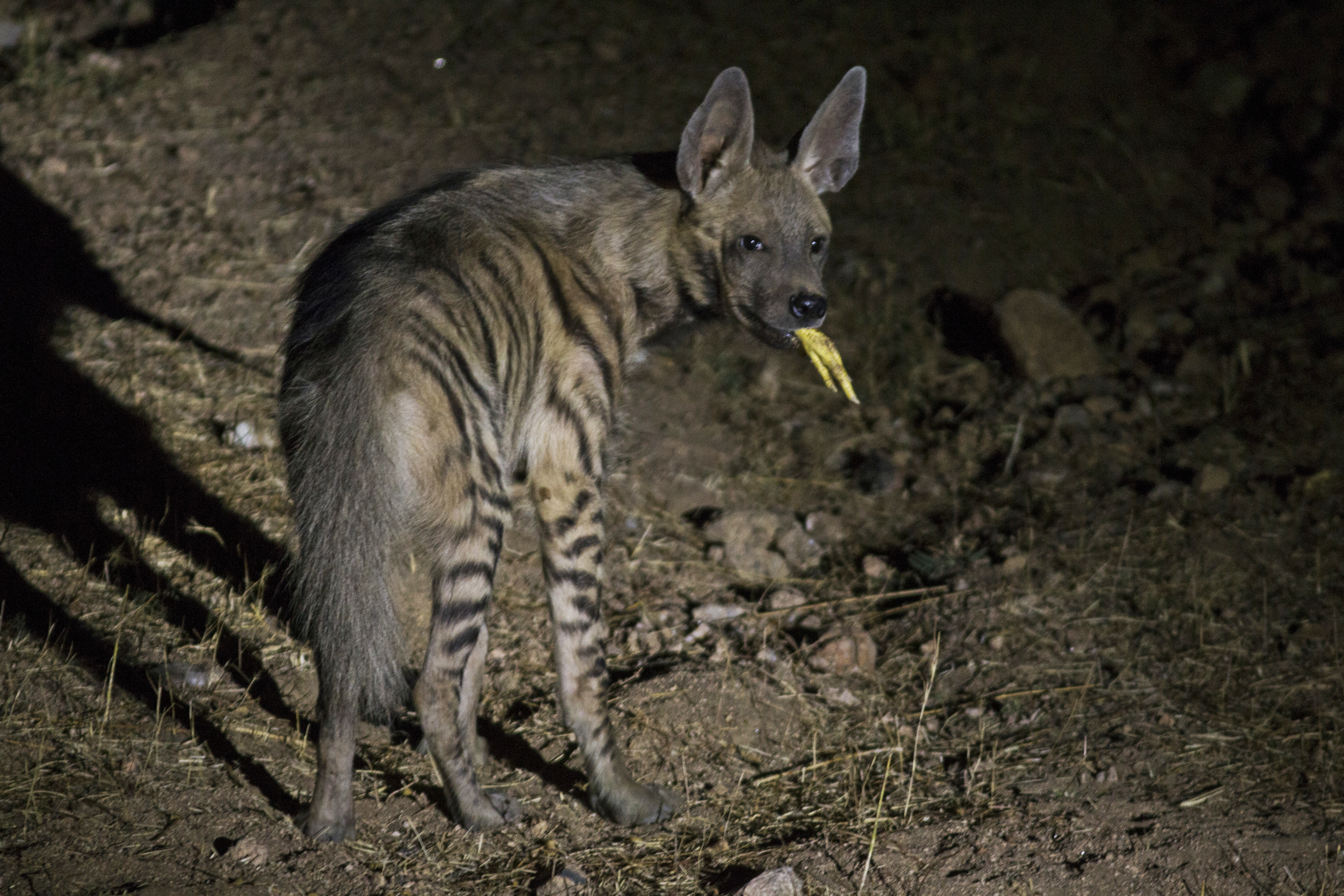
A striped hyena feeding on slaughterhouse discards.

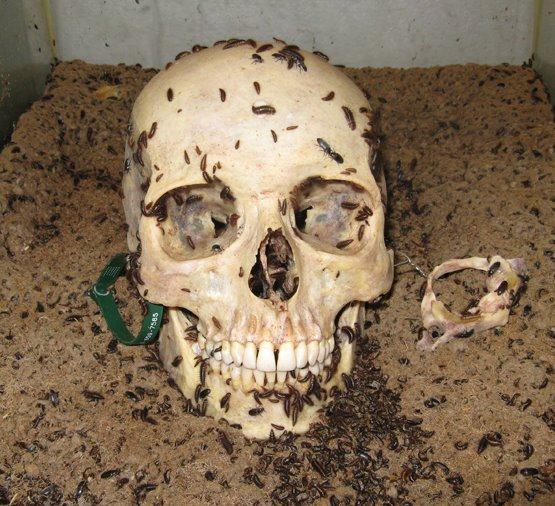
Dermestid beetles stripping the soft tissue from a human skull.

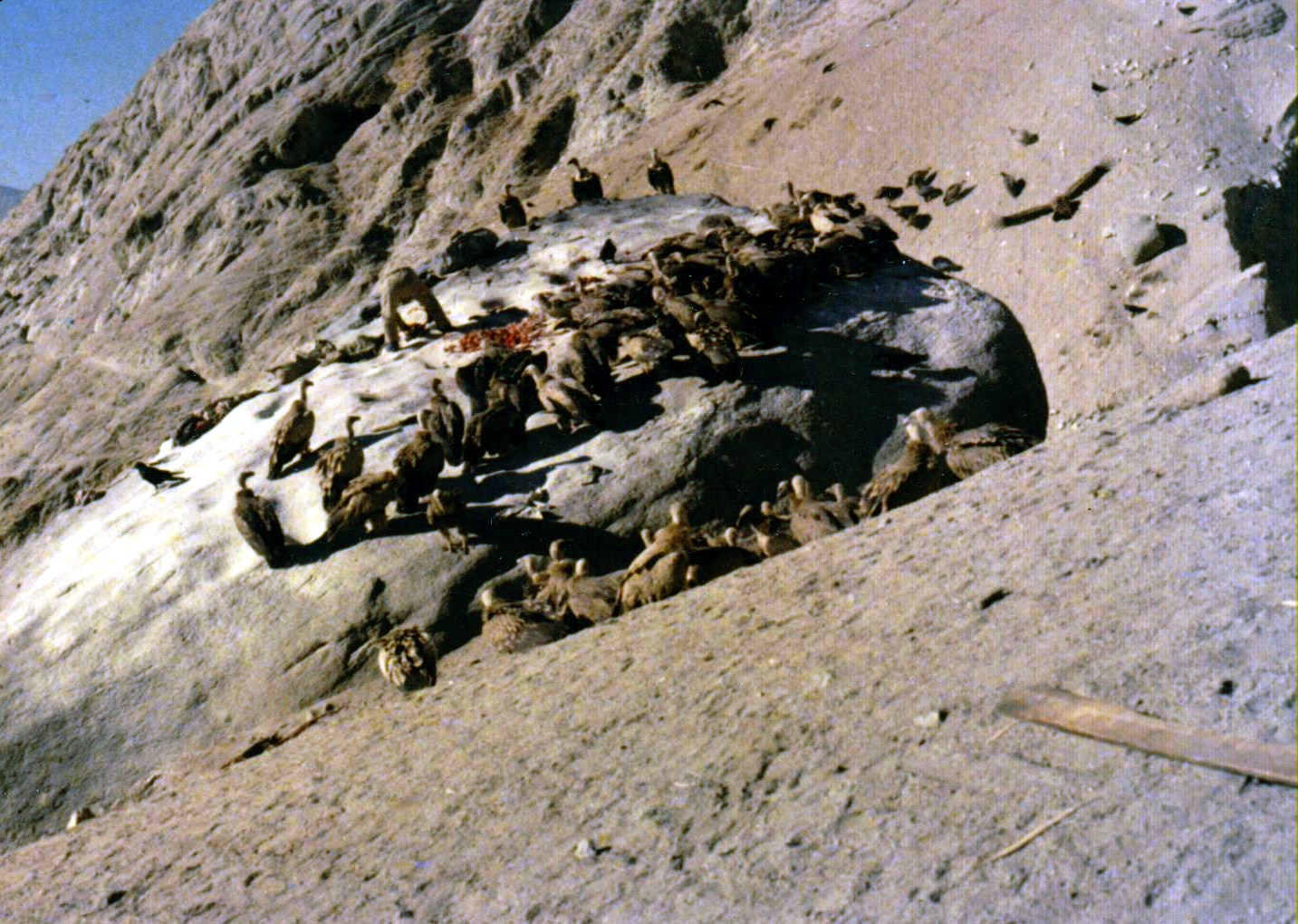
Gyps vultures at a sky burial in Tibet.

== See also ==
- Thanatophage
- Detritivore
- Decomposer
- Saprotrophic nutrition
- Consumer-resource systems
