= Saprophagy =

Feeding on dead plant or animal biomass by sessile organisms

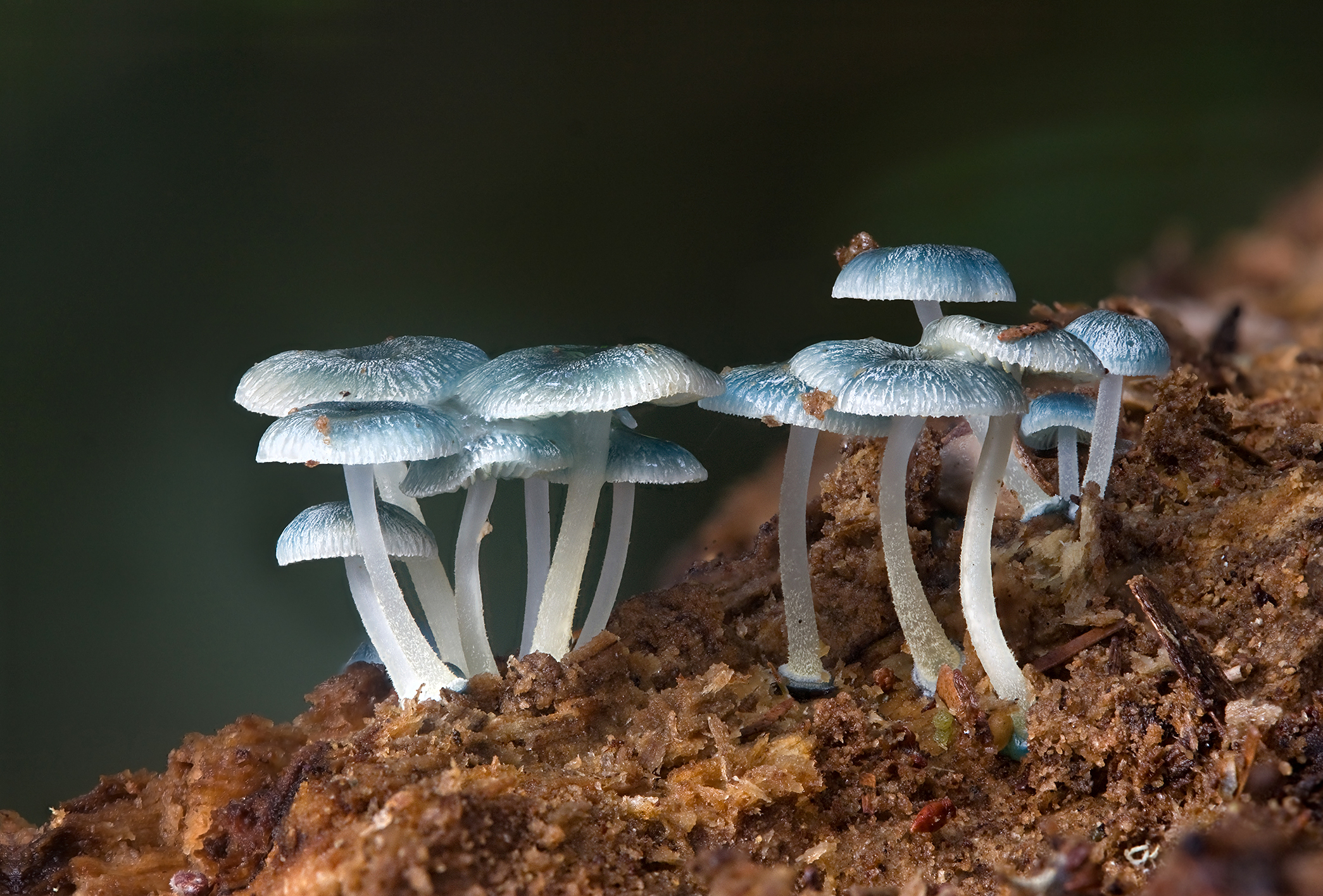
Fungi are the primary decomposers in most environments, illustrated here Mycena interrupta.

Saprophages are organisms that obtain nutrients by consuming decomposing dead plant or animal biomass. They are distinguished from detritivores in that saprophages are sessile consumers while detritivores are mobile. Typical saprophagic animals include sedentary polychaetes such as amphitrites (worms of the family Terebellidae) and other terebellids.

The eating of wood, whether live or dead, is known as xylophagy. The activity of animals feeding only on dead wood is called sapro-xylophagy and those animals, sapro-xylophagous.

== Ecology ==
In food webs, saprophages generally play the roles of decomposers. There are two main branches of saprophages, broken down by nutrient source. There are necrophages which consume dead animal biomass, and thanatophages which consume dead plant biomass.

== See also ==
- Detritivore
- Decomposer
- Saprotrophic nutrition
- Consumer-resource systems
