= Thanatophage =

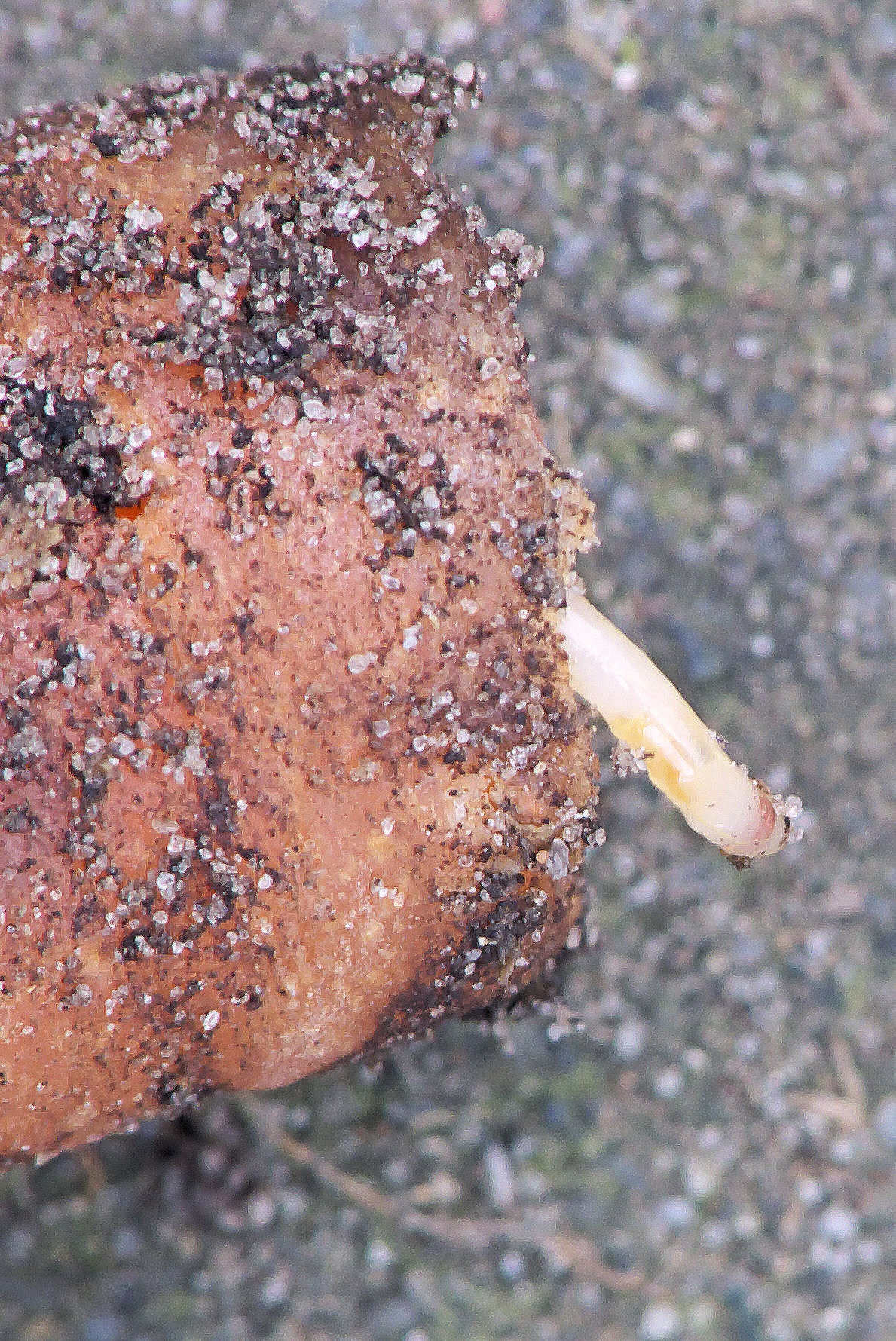
Chamaepsila rosae larvae eating a dead carrot

Thanatophages, are organisms that obtain nutrients by consuming decomposing dead plant biomass.

== Ecology ==
In food webs, thanatophages generally play the roles of decomposers.

The eating of wood, whether live or dead, is known as xylophagy. The activity of animals feeding only on dead wood is called sapro-xylophagy and those animals, sapro-xylophagous.

== Saprophytes ==
Saprophyte (-phyte meaning "plant") is a botanical term that is no longer in popular use, as such plants have been discovered to actually be parasitic on fungi. There are no real saprotrophic organisms that are embryophytes, and fungi and bacteria are no longer placed in the plant kingdom. Plants that were once considered saprophytes, such as non-photosynthetic orchids and monotropes, are now known to be parasites on fungi. These species are now termed myco-heterotrophs.

== See also ==
- Necrophage
- Detritivore
- Decomposer
- Saprotrophic nutrition
- Consumer-resource systems
