= Saprovore =

Saprovore is variously defined, as:

- a detritus-eating animal
- any saprotroph or decomposer, i.e. any organism feeding on dead organic matter (see Saprotrophic nutrition)
