= Neomyxine =

Scientific classification
- Kingdom: Animalia
- Phylum: Chordata
- Infraphylum: Agnatha
- Superclass: Cyclostomi
- Class: Myxini
- Order: Myxiniformes
- Family: Myxinidae
- Subfamily: Myxininae
- Genus: Neomyxine; L. R. Richardson & Jowett, 1951

Type species
- Neomyxine biniplicata Richardson 1953

Genus of jawless fishes

Neomyxine is a genus of hagfish found in the Pacific Ocean around New Zealand.

== Species ==
Two species in this genus are recognized:

- Neomyxine biniplicata (L. R. Richardson & Jowett, 1951) (slender hagfish)
- Neomyxine caesiovitta A. L. Stewart & Zintzen, 2015 (blueband hagfish)
