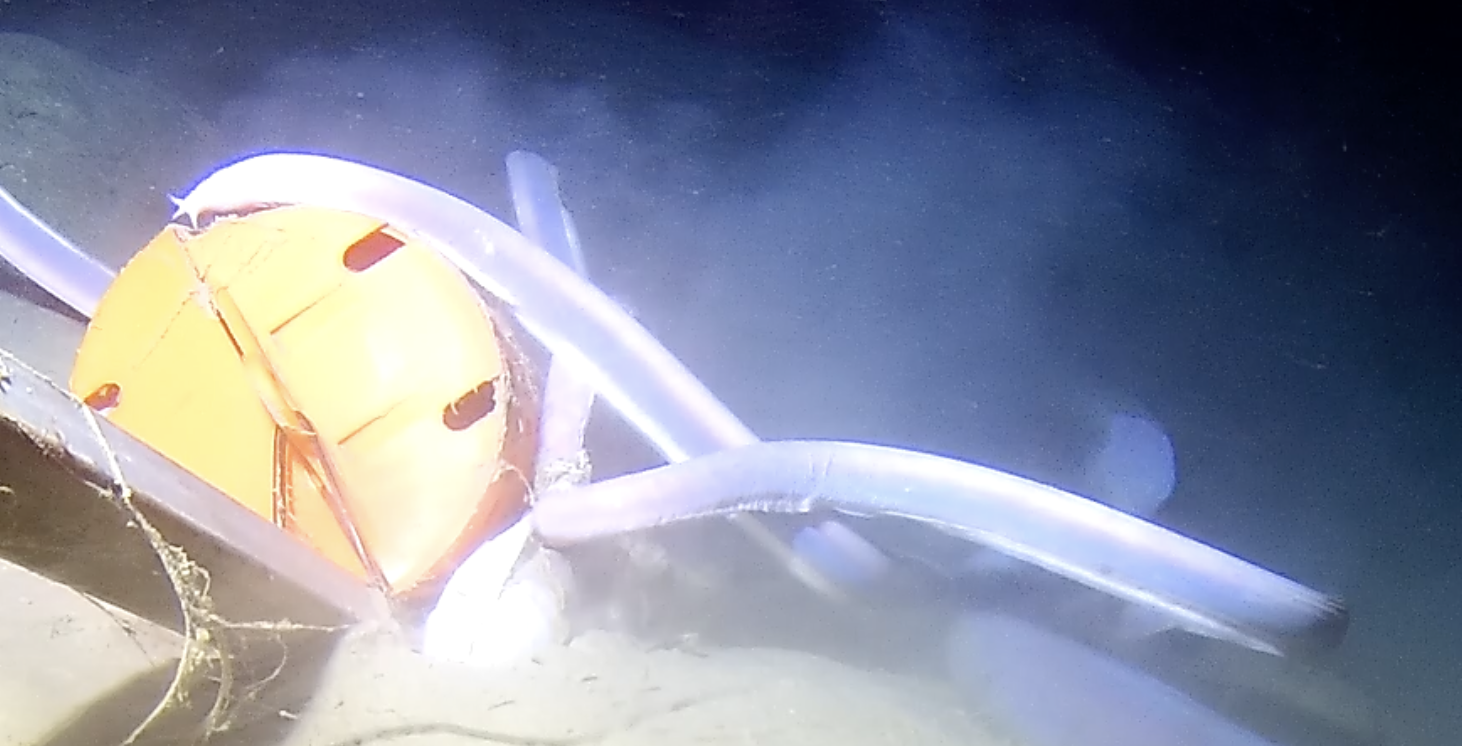

Scientific classification
- Kingdom: Animalia
- Phylum: Chordata
- Infraphylum: Agnatha
- Superclass: Cyclostomi
- Class: Myxini
- Order: Myxiniformes
- Family: Myxinidae
- Genus: Neomyxine
- Species: N. caesiovitta

Binomial name
- Neomyxine caesiovitta A. L. Stewart & Zintzen, 2015

= Neomyxine caesiovitta =

Species of jawless fish

Neomyxine caesiovitta, the blueband hagfish, is a species of hagfish endemic to New Zealand.

== Description ==
Neomyxine caesiovitta can reach a standard length of 64.8 centimetres (25.5 in).
