= Nassarius clarus =

Scientific classification
- Kingdom: Animalia
- Phylum: Mollusca
- Class: Gastropoda
- Subclass: Caenogastropoda
- Order: Neogastropoda
- Family: Nassariidae
- Genus: Nassarius
- Species: N. clarus

Binomial name
- Nassarius clarus (Marrat, 1877)

Synonyms
- Nassa australis A. Adams, 1853; Nassa clara Marrat, 1877; Nassa semiplicata Adams, A., 1877; Nassarius (Zeuxis) clarus (Marrat, 1877); Nassarius australis (A. Adams, 1853)

Species of gastropod

Nassarius clarus is a species of sea snail, a marine gastropod mollusk in the family Nassariidae, the Nassa mud snails or dog whelks.

== Description ==
The length of the shell varies between 16 mm and 30 mm.

== Distribution ==
This marine species occurs off Western Australia and in the Indian Ocean.

== Ecology ==
Nassarius clarus feeds on dead fishes and other carrion.
