= Neomyxine biniplicata =

Conservation status
- Data Deficient (IUCN 3.1)

Scientific classification
- Kingdom: Animalia
- Phylum: Chordata
- Infraphylum: Agnatha
- Superclass: Cyclostomi
- Class: Myxini
- Order: Myxiniformes
- Family: Myxinidae
- Genus: Neomyxine
- Species: N. biniplicata

Binomial name
- Neomyxine biniplicata (L. R. Richardson & Jowett, 1951)

Synonyms
- Myxine biniplicata Richardson & Jowett 1951

Species of jawless fish

Neomyxine biniplicata, the slender hagfish, is a species of hagfish endemic to New Zealand. It is known from along the east coast, from the northern end of the Bay of Plenty to Kaikōura at depths of 35–396 m, and is found on silty to coarse sediments and rocky seabeds.
