= Consumer–resource interactions =

Dietary interactions between species

Consumer–resource interactions are the core motif of ecological food chains or food webs, and are an umbrella term for a variety of more specialized types of biological species interactions including prey-predator (see predation), host-parasite (see parasitism), plant-herbivore and victim-exploiter systems. These kinds of interactions have been studied and modeled by population ecologists for nearly a century. Species at the bottom of the food chain, such as algae and other autotrophs, consume non-biological resources, such as minerals and nutrients of various kinds, and they derive their energy from light (photons) or chemical sources. Species higher up in the food chain survive by consuming other species and can be classified by what they eat and how they obtain or find their food.

== Classification of consumer types ==
=== The standard categorization ===
Various terms have arisen to define consumers by what they eat, such as meat-eating carnivores, fish-eating piscivores, insect-eating insectivores, plant-eating herbivores, seed-eating granivores, and fruit-eating frugivores and omnivores are meat eaters and plant eaters. An extensive classification of consumer categories based on a list of feeding behaviors exists.

=== The Getz categorization ===
Wayne Getz's consumer categories are based on material eaten (plant: green live, brown dead; animal: red live, purple dead; or particulate: grey) and feeding strategy (gatherer: lighter shades; miner: darker shades).

Another way of categorizing consumers, proposed by South African American ecologist Wayne Getz, is based on a biomass transformation web (BTW) formulation that organizes resources into five components: live and dead animal, live and dead plant, and particulate matter (such as a composted carcass or rotting plant matter). It also distinguishes between consumers that gather their resources by moving across landscapes from those that mine their resources by becoming sessile once they have located a stock of resources large enough for them to feed on during completion of a full life history stage.

In Getz's scheme, words for miners are of Greek etymology and words for gatherers are of Latin etymology. Thus a bestivore, such as a cat, preys on live animals (Latin: bestia=animal) while a sarcophage, such as a botfly larva mines live flesh and a zontanophage (Greek: zontanos=alive), such as a leaf miner, mines live plant material. A carcasivore (Latin: carcasium=carcass), such as white-backed vulture, scavenge animal carcasses while a necrophage (Greek: nekros=dead body), such as a blowfly, mines dead flesh. Victivores (Latin: victus=living) gather live plant material and thus include frugivores, nectivores, graminivores, granivores and folivores as subcategories. Lectivores, such as many termites, gather dead plant material (Latin: lectus=bed which is the root of the word litter, as in leaf-litter) and thanatophages (Greek: thanatos=death), such as pillbugs mine piles of dead plant material. Carnivore and herbivore are generic multigroup categories for gathers respectively of animal and plant material, irrespective of whether live or dead. Croppers, scavengers, and detritivores are gatherers respectively of live, dead, and particulate material. Parasites, saprophages, and decomposers are miners respectively of live, dead, and particulate material.

=== Specialist totivores (gatherers) ===
- Folivore
- Frugivore
- Fungivore
- Carnivore
- Insectivore
- Molluscivore
- Piscivore
- Avivore
- Spongivore
- Graminivore
- Granivore
- Nectarivore
- Palynivore
- Bacterivore
- Detritivore
- Ophiophagy

=== Specialist olophages (miners) ===
- Coprophagy
- Geophagy
- Hematophagy
- Lepidophagy
- Mucophagy
- Myrmecophagy
- Osteophagy
- Oophagy
- Ophiophagy
- Ovophagy
- Placentophagy
- Saprophagy
- Sarcophagy
- Thanatophagy
- Xylophagy
- Zontanophagy

== See also ==
- Cannibalism
- Food web
- Herbivore
- Omnivore
- Parasitoid
- Predation
- Scavenger
- Trophallaxis
- Consumer-resource model
