= Decomposer =

Organism that breaks down dead or decaying organisms

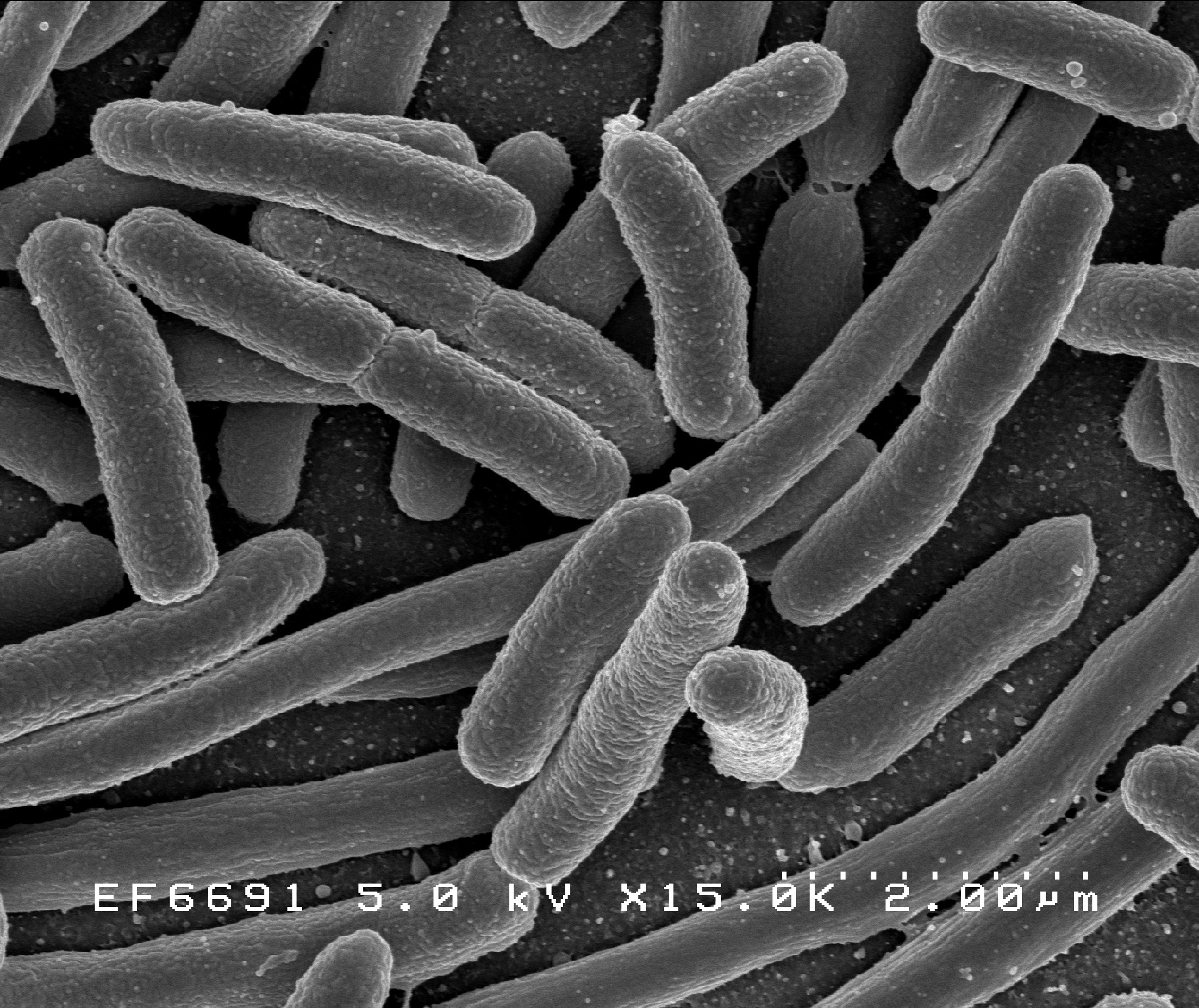
Bacteria are also decomposers.

Decomposers are organisms that break down dead organisms and release the nutrients from the dead matter into the environment around them. Decomposition relies on chemical processes similar to digestion in animals; in fact, many sources use the words digestion and decomposition interchangeably. In both processes, complex molecules are chemically broken down by enzymes into simpler, smaller ones. The term "digestion," however, is commonly used to refer to food breakdown that occurs within animal bodies, and results in the absorption of nutrients from the gut into the animal's bloodstream. This is contrasted with external digestion, meaning that, rather than swallowing food and then digesting it using enzymes located within a GI tract, an organism instead releases enzymes directly onto the food source, which is what decomposers do as compared to animals. After allowing the enzymes time to digest the material, the decomposer then absorbs the nutrients from the environment into its cells. Decomposition is often erroneously conflated with this process of external digestion, probably because of the strong association between fungi, which are external digesters, and decomposition.

The term "decomposer" refers to a role in an ecosystem, not to a particular class or type of organism, or even to a specific capacity of those organisms. The definition of "decomposer" therefore centers on the outcome of the decomposition process, rather than the types of organisms performing it. At the center of this definition are the organisms that benefit most directly from the increase in nutrient availability that results from decomposition; plants and other non-mobile (sessile) autotrophs cannot travel to seek out nutrients, and most cannot digest other organisms themselves. They must therefore rely on decomposers to free up nutrients from dead matter that they can then absorb.

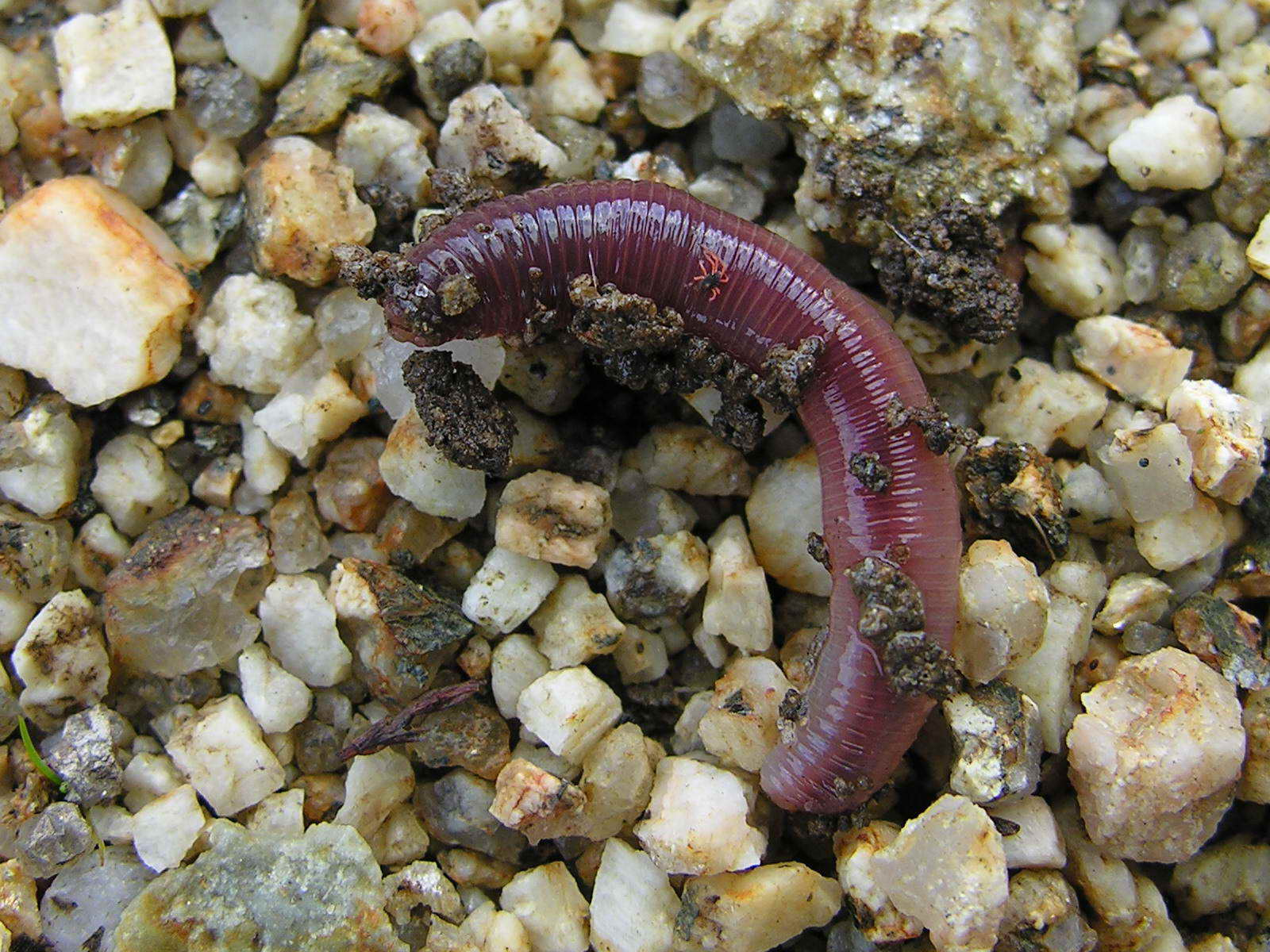
Some worms are decomposers.

Note that this definition does not focus on where digestion takes place (i.e. inside or outside of an organism's body), but rather on where the products of that digestion end up. "Decomposer" as a category, therefore, would include not just fungi and bacteria, which perform external digestion, but also invertebrates such as earthworms, woodlice, and sea cucumbers that digest dead matter internally and release nutrients locally via their feces. In some definitions of decomposition that center on the means and location of digestion, these invertebrates, which digest their food internally, are set apart from decomposers and placed in a separate category called detritivores. These categories are not, in fact, mutually exclusive. "Detritivore" describes behavior and physiology, while "decomposer" describes an ecosystem role. Therefore, an organism can be both a detritivore and a decomposer.

While there are also purely physical processes, like weathering and ultraviolet light, that contribute to decomposition, "decomposer" refers only to living organisms that contribute to the process, whether by physical or chemical breakdown of dead matter.

== Terrestrial decomposers ==
In terrestrial environments, decomposition happens mainly in or on soil, and decomposers' activities lead to increased soil fertility. The main nutrients plants have to derive from soils are nitrogen, phosphorus, and potassium, and all three have to be available in forms that are accessible to and absorbable by the plants. Decomposition is the process of breaking large molecules in dead matter down into smaller molecules that nearby plants are able to take up through their roots. Some steps of the process occur via mechanical grinding and churning by things like earthworms and plant roots in a process called bioturbation. Further breakdown, beyond those physical means, requires the presence of enzymes. The paired processes are akin to what occurs in mammal digestive tracts: food is mechanically ground up by teeth, and then chemically broken down by enzymes.

A given organism's ability to contribute to decomposition is largely dependent on what enzymes that organism possesses. Enzymes for the digestion of molecules like fats, proteins, and starch are widespread and many organisms, from microbes to mammals, have them. As a result, those molecules are the first to decompose in the environment. Cellulose in dead plants is broken down by cellulase enzymes, which are present in far fewer organisms, and the enzymes needed to digest lignin, a chemically complex molecule in woody trees and shrubs, in fewer still.

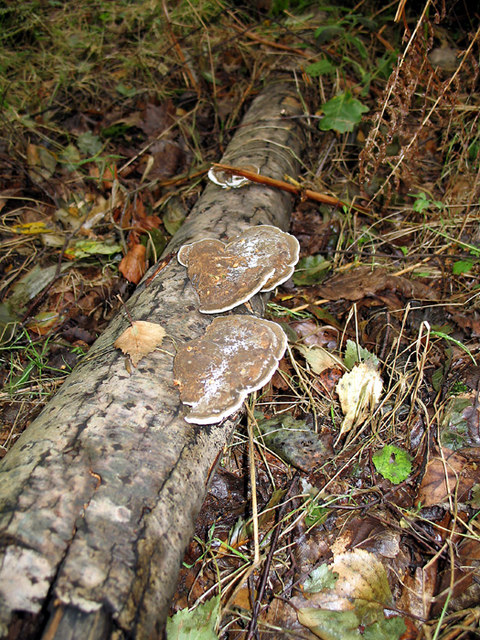
Fungi acting as decomposers of a fallen tree branch

=== Fungi ===
The primary decomposer of litter in many ecosystems is fungi. Unlike bacteria, which are unicellular organisms and are decomposers as well, most saprotrophic fungi grow as a branching network of hyphae. Bacteria are restricted to growing and feeding on the exposed surfaces of organic matter, but fungi can use their hyphae to penetrate larger pieces of organic matter below the surface. Additionally, only wood-decay fungi have evolved lignin-modifying enzymes necessary to decompose lignin. These two factors make fungi the primary decomposers in forests, where litter has high concentrations of lignin and often occurs in large pieces like fallen trees and branches. Fungi decompose organic matter by releasing enzymes to break down the decaying material, after which they absorb the nutrients in the decaying material. Hyphae are used to break down matter and absorb nutrients and are also used in reproduction.

== See also ==
- Chemotroph
- Micro-animals
- Microorganism
