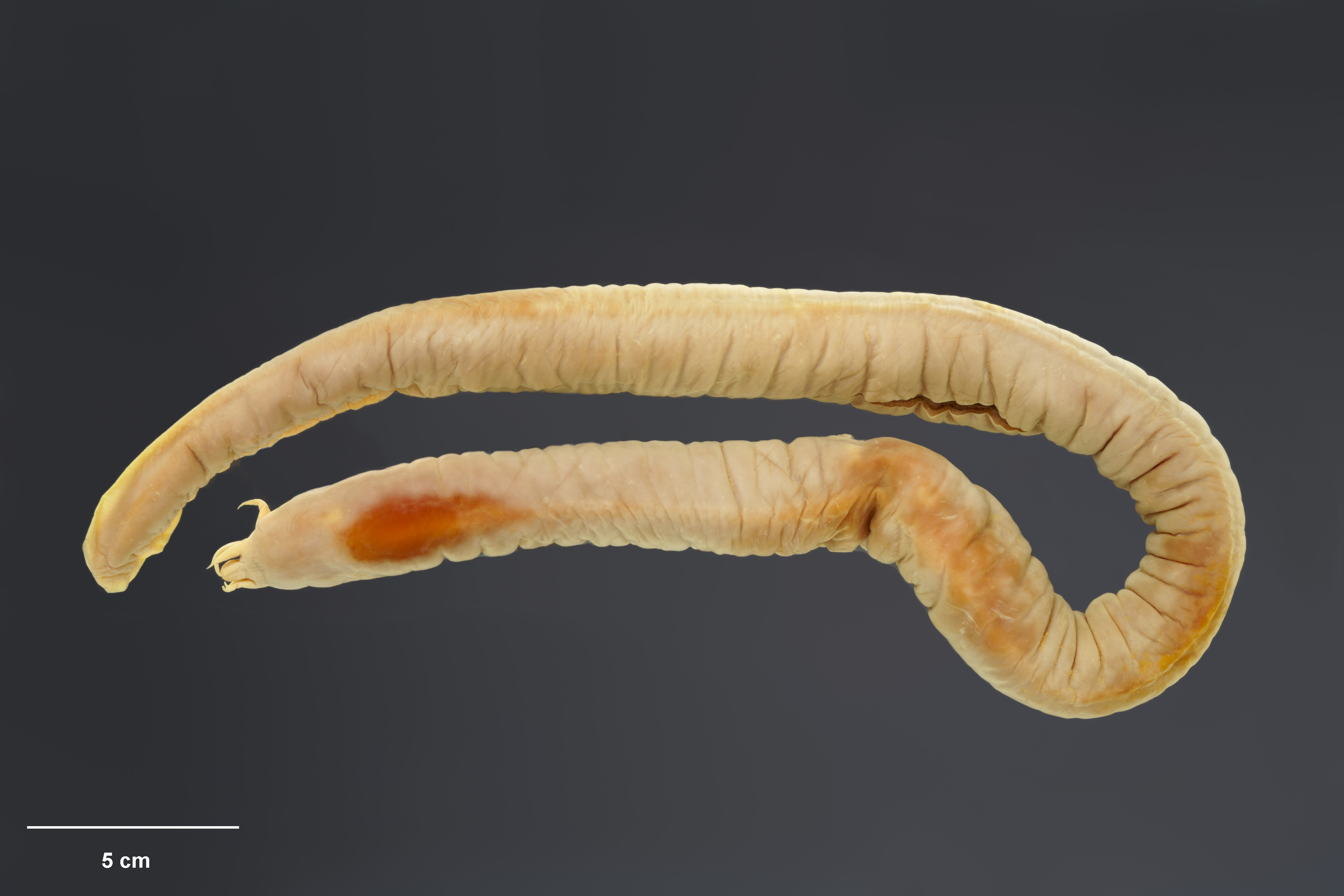

Conservation status
- Data Deficient (IUCN 3.1)

Scientific classification
- Kingdom: Animalia
- Phylum: Chordata
- Infraphylum: Agnatha
- Class: Myxini
- Order: Myxiniformes
- Family: Myxinidae
- Genus: Rubicundus
- Species: R. eos

Binomial name
- Rubicundus eos (Fernholm, 1991)

Synonyms
- Eptatretus eos Fernholm, 1991

= Rubicundus eos =

Pink hagfish

Species of jawless fish

Rubicundus eos, commonly known as the pink hagfish, is a species of jawless fish in the family Myxinidae.

It was originally classified in the genus Eptatretus, but a 2013 analysis reclassified into the new genus Rubicundus, considered the sister genus to the rest of hagfish species. The specific epithet eos references Eos, the Greek goddess of the dawn, referencing its pink coloration.

It is native to deep waters of the Tasman Sea, likely in deep-water coral reefs. It is known only from a single specimen collected off the coast of New Zealand. Nothing is known about its life history or ecology.
