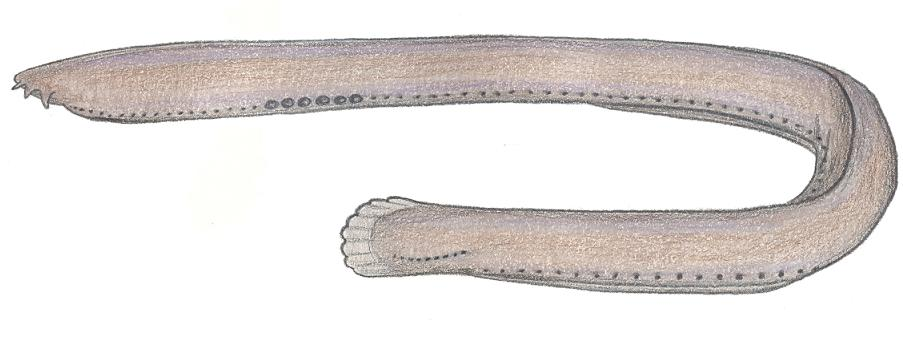

Scientific classification
- Kingdom: Animalia
- Phylum: Chordata
- Infraphylum: Agnatha
- Class: Myxini
- Order: Myxiniformes
- Family: Myxinidae
- Genus: Eptatretus
- Species: E. springeri

Binomial name
- Eptatretus springeri (Bigelow & Schroeder, 1952)

Synonyms
- Paramyxine springeri Bigelow & Schroeder 1952

= Eptatretus springeri =

Species of jawless fish

Eptatretus springeri, the Gulf hagfish, is a bathydemersal vertebrate which lives primarily in the northeastern Gulf of Mexico. It has been observed feeding at and around brine pools: areas of high salinity which resemble lakes on the ocean floor that do not mix with the surrounding water due to difference in density. The high salt content, approximately 200 ppt compared to 35 ppt for standard seawater, creates a buoyant surface which renders oceanic submersibles unable to descend into the pool. It is believed that the inside of the pools only supports microbial life, while the majority of macroscopic life, such as methane-utilizing mussels, exists on the edges. The Gulf hagfish feeds on the primary producers of these environments, as well as other predators.

Like other species of hagfish, the Gulf hagfish produces slime from glands in its skin. It also exhibits complex knotting behavior, in which the body of the hagfish is twisted into knots, believed to be related to the removal or management of slime. Hagfish of the genus Eptatretus (including E.springeri and the more extensively studied E. stoutii), are able to form more complex knots than those of genus Myxine due to the anisotropic nature of their skin.

== See also ==
- Hagfish
