= Rubicundus lakeside =

Lakeside hagfish

Conservation status
- Data Deficient (IUCN 3.1)

Scientific classification
- Kingdom: Animalia
- Phylum: Chordata
- Infraphylum: Agnatha
- Class: Myxini
- Order: Myxiniformes
- Family: Myxinidae
- Genus: Rubicundus
- Species: R. lakeside

Binomial name
- Rubicundus lakeside (Mincarone & J. E. McCosker, 2004)

Synonyms
- Eptatretus lakeside Mincarone & J.E. McCosker, 2004

Species of jawless fish

Rubicundus lakeside, the Lakeside hagfish, is a species of jawless fish in the family Myxinidae.

It was originally classified in the genus Eptatretus, but a 2013 analysis reclassified into the new genus Rubicundus, considered the most basal genus of hagfish. The specific epithet lakeside honors the Lakeside Foundation of California for supporting the work of Michael Mincarone, one of its descriptors.

This species is only known from deep water habitats off the coast of the Galápagos Islands. It is known from a single specimen collected in a lava reef off Fernandina Island. Nothing is known about its life history or ecology.
