= Rubicundus lopheliae =

Lophelia hagfish

Conservation status
- Data Deficient (IUCN 3.1)

Scientific classification
- Kingdom: Animalia
- Phylum: Chordata
- Infraphylum: Agnatha
- Class: Myxini
- Order: Myxiniformes
- Family: Myxinidae
- Genus: Rubicundus
- Species: R. lopheliae

Binomial name
- Rubicundus lopheliae (Fernholm & Quattrini, 2008)

Synonyms
- Eptatretus lopheliae Fernholm & Quattrini, 2008

Species of jawless fish

Rubicundus lopheliae, the lophelia hagfish, is a species of jawless fish in the family Myxinidae.

It was originally classified in the genus Eptatretus, but a 2013 analysis reclassified into the new genus Rubicundus, considered the most basal genus of hagfish. This is the only member of Rubicundus known from more than one specimen.

This species is known from the western North Atlantic, off the coast of the southeastern United States, where it is known from three specimens captured off North Carolina and video observations off South Carolina. It inhabits cold-water coral reefs dominated primarily by Lophelia, as referenced in its specific epithet. There are no known threats to this species, although it may be significantly impacted by bottom trawling due to its habitat.
