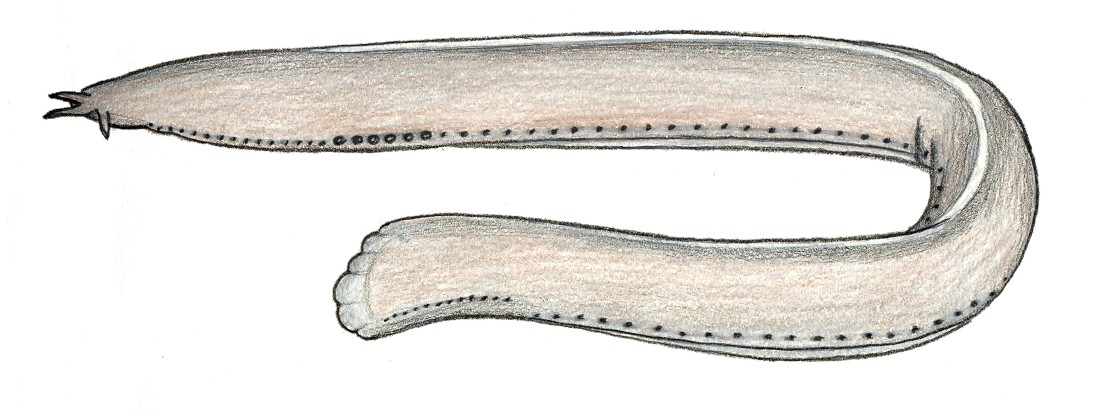

Conservation status
- Data Deficient (IUCN 3.1)

Scientific classification
- Kingdom: Animalia
- Phylum: Chordata
- Infraphylum: Agnatha
- Superclass: Cyclostomi
- Class: Myxini
- Order: Myxiniformes
- Family: Myxinidae
- Genus: Eptatretus
- Species: E. minor

Binomial name
- Eptatretus minor Fernholm & C. L. Hubbs, 1981

= Eptatretus minor =

Species of jawless fish

Eptatretus minor is a bathydemersal and non-migratory hagfish of the genus Eptatretus. It is found in the deep waters of the northern area of the Gulf of Mexico between Louisiana and Florida, at depths between 300 and 470 m. This hagfish is a relatively short and stout species, reaching a maximum length of nearly 40 cm. It is only known from a few specimens.
