= Rubicundus =

Scientific classification
- Kingdom: Animalia
- Phylum: Chordata
- Infraphylum: Agnatha
- Class: Myxini
- Order: Myxiniformes
- Family: Myxinidae
- Subfamily: Rubicundinae; Fernholm et al., 2013
- Genus: Rubicundus; Fernholm et al, 2013

Type species
- Rubicundus rubicundus (Kuo, Lee & Mok 2010)

Species
- See text

Genus of jawless fishes

Rubicundus is a genus of hagfishes, the only extant member of the subfamily Rubicundinae. All species in it were formerly classified in Eptatretus. R. eos, R. lakeside, and R. rubicundus are known from single specimens caught in the Tasman Sea, Galápagos, and Taiwan, respectively. They are named after the distinctive red coloration that all species share, and are further distinguished from other Myxinidae by their five gill openings and single, tubular nostril.

They represent the sister lineage to all other extant lineages of hagfishes, and may represent the sister group to the Cretaceous fossil hagfish Tethymyxine, from which they potentially diverged during the Late Jurassic or Early Cretaceous. Both Rubicundus and Tethymyxine share an elongate snout, indented barbels, and numerous slime glands. Phylogenetic studies indicate that the Rubicundinae lineage may have diverged from other extant hagfishes during the Permian, making them an extremely old lineage.

== Species ==
Four recognized species are placed in this genus:

- Rubicundus eos (Fernholm, 1991) (pink hagfish)
- Rubicundus lakeside (Mincarone & J. E. McCosker, 2004) (Lakeside hagfish)
- Rubicundus lopheliae (Fernholm & Quattrini, 2008) (Lophelia hagfish)
- Rubicundus rubicundus (C. H. Kuo, S. C. Lee & H. K. Mok, 2010)
