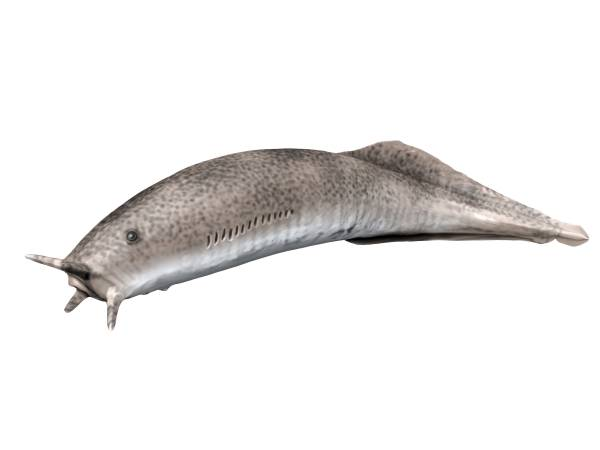
- Reconstruction

Scientific classification
- Kingdom: Animalia
- Phylum: Chordata
- Infraphylum: Agnatha
- Superclass: Cyclostomi
- Class: Myxini
- Order: Myxiniformes
- Genus: †Myxinikela; Bardack, 1991
- Species: †M. siroka

Binomial name
- †Myxinikela siroka Bardack, 1991

= Myxinikela =

Myxinikela Temporal range: Pennsylvanian , 311–306 Ma

Extinct genus of stem-hagfish

Myxinikela is an extinct genus of stem-hagfish known from the Late Carboniferous of Illinois, USA. It is the earliest definitive hagfish known from fossil remains, and one of only two alongside the Cretaceous crown-group hagfish Tethymyxine.

Myxinikela's anatomy displays basal features of cyclostomes (cartilaginous branchial baskets, separation between esophageal and branchial passages, and a well-differentiated midline finfold), giving it a somewhat lamprey-like appearance, but it also has numerous derived traits of hagfishes such as a nasohypophyseal aperture, large velar cavity, and a cardinal heart; due to this, Myxinikela can be considered a transitional form between basal cyclostomes and modern hagfishes.

Myxinikela is known from two specimens from the Mazon Creek fossil beds; such fossilized cyclostome specimens are rare due to their soft bodies, requiring very specific methods of preservation. Myxinikela fossils are known from Francis Creek Shale, fossil layers which are thought to represent a shallow-water environment of fluctuating salinity and turbidity; this contrasts with modern hagfishes, which inhabit deep-water environments. As Myxinikela fossils are rare in the well-studied formation, this indicates it was likely either an overall rare species, a seasonal migrant through the area, or that the fossils represented transient members from nearby habitats.
