= Rubicundus rubicundus =

Scientific classification
- Kingdom: Animalia
- Phylum: Chordata
- Infraphylum: Agnatha
- Class: Myxini
- Order: Myxiniformes
- Family: Myxinidae
- Genus: Rubicundus
- Species: R. rubicundus

Binomial name
- Rubicundus rubicundus (Kuo, Lee, and Mok, 1991)

Synonyms
- Eptatretus rubicundus Kuo, Lee and Mok, 2010

Species of fish

Rubicundus rubicundus is a species of hagfish in the genus Rubicundus.

== Physical appearance ==
It has zero dorsal spines, zero dorsal soft rays, zero anal spines, and zero anal soft rays. The Branchial slime spores and the gill apertures are arranged in a straight line the distances from a branchial slime pore to its immediately preceding and posterior gill apertures similar, the ventral aorta isn't bifurcated. The body color is pink. It has 5 gill apertures.

== Etymology ==
The specific epithet is a combination of the Latin ruber (= red), and -cundus (= denoting continuance or augmentation). The name refers to the pink body color of the animal.

== Habitat ==
The species is found in Northeastern Taiwan, mostly in the coordinates 24°56.5'N, 121°53.0'E, near the town of Dali.

== History ==
It was discovered by Aquatic Scientists Chien-Hsein Kuo, Sin-Che Lee, and Hin Kiu Mok.
