= Eptatretus bischoffii =

Conservation status
- Data Deficient (IUCN 3.1)

Scientific classification
- Kingdom: Animalia
- Phylum: Chordata
- Infraphylum: Agnatha
- Superclass: Cyclostomi
- Class: Myxini
- Order: Myxiniformes
- Family: Myxinidae
- Genus: Eptatretus
- Species: E. bischoffii

Binomial name
- Eptatretus bischoffii (A. F. Schneider, 1880)

Synonyms
- Bdellostoma bischoffii Schneider 1880; Heptatretus decatrema Regan 1912; Eptatretus decatrema (Regan 1912)

Species of jawless fish

Eptatretus bischoffii is a common hagfish of the genus Eptatretus. Its maximum length is 55 centimetres (22 in). It lives in a demersal, non-migratory, marine habitat with its depth range between 8–50 m. It can survive in only temperate zones. These organisms are found in the South Pacific, mainly, Chile. It is harmless to humans.

The mode of reproduction in this kind of organism is external. The copulatory organs are absent. The gonads of hagfishes are situated in the peritoneal cavity. The ovary is found in the anterior portion of the gonad, and the testis is found in the posterior part. The animal becomes female if the cranial part of the gonad develops or male if the caudal part undergoes differentiation. If none develops, then the animal becomes sterile. If both anterior and posterior parts develop, then the animal becomes a functional hermaphrodite. However, hermaphroditism being characterised as functional needs to be validated by more reproduction studies.

The eggs develop in the demersal areas. The shape of the eggs are elongated. The egg contains a single micropylar opening located at the animal pole. It is situated at the bottom of a micropylar cup which lies between the anchor filaments. The single filaments are 3.2–4.9 millimetres (0.13–0.19 in) long and have an anchor-shaped apical end. The number of filaments varies around 50 but is always smaller on the vegetative end. On both ends of laid eggs, the filaments are enveloped by a gel-like matrix intertwined with large cytoskeletal biopolymers (keratin-like intermediate filaments) of possible holocrine origin.
