= Notomyxine =

Conservation status
- Data Deficient (IUCN 3.1)

Scientific classification
- Kingdom: Animalia
- Phylum: Chordata
- Infraphylum: Agnatha
- Class: Myxini
- Order: Myxiniformes
- Family: Myxinidae
- Subfamily: Myxininae
- Genus: Notomyxine; Nani & Gneri, 1951
- Species: N. tridentiger

Binomial name
- Notomyxine tridentiger (Garman 1899)

Synonyms
- Myxine tridentiger Garman 1899

Genus of jawless fish

Notomyxine is a monospecific genus of hagfish that occurs in the Atlantic Ocean off the southern coasts of South America. The only member of the genus is Notomyxine tridentiger. It can be found in the temperate waters of the Southeast Pacific and Southwest Atlantic, as well as the southern coasts of South America. It can reach a maximum length of 57 cm.

== Conservation status ==
Notomyxine tridentiger has been found only along the Argentinean continental shelf and southern Chile and has not been reported since 1968. Its shallow depth range and medium body size make it very likely to be exposed to extensive trawling activities throughout its range, although it has not been reported in any bycatch surveys. It is listed as data deficient by the IUCN. More research is needed to understand the distribution, population status, habitat, biology, ecology, and impact of potential major threats to this species.

== Habitat ==
This species is located off the south coast of South America, from northern Argentina (off Buenos Aires) to southern Chile, including the Strait of Magellan and Tierra del Fuego. It is found on muddy bottoms of the continental shelf at depths from 6–143 m.

== Reproduction ==
The copulatory organ is absent in this species. The gonads of hagfishes are situated in the peritoneal cavity. The ovary is found in the anterior portion of the gonad, and the testis is found in the posterior part. The animal becomes female if the cranial part of the gonad develops or male if the caudal part undergoes differentiation. If none develops, then the animal becomes sterile. If both anterior and posterior parts develop, then the animal becomes a functional hermaphrodite. However, hermaphroditism being characterised as functional needs to be validated by more reproduction studies (Patzner 1998). Of 11 females (405–575 mm in total length) examined by Nani and Gneri (1951), those longer than 500 mm were mature. A 507-mm female contained eggs ranging in size from 24.5 x 6.6 to 28 x 8 mm.
