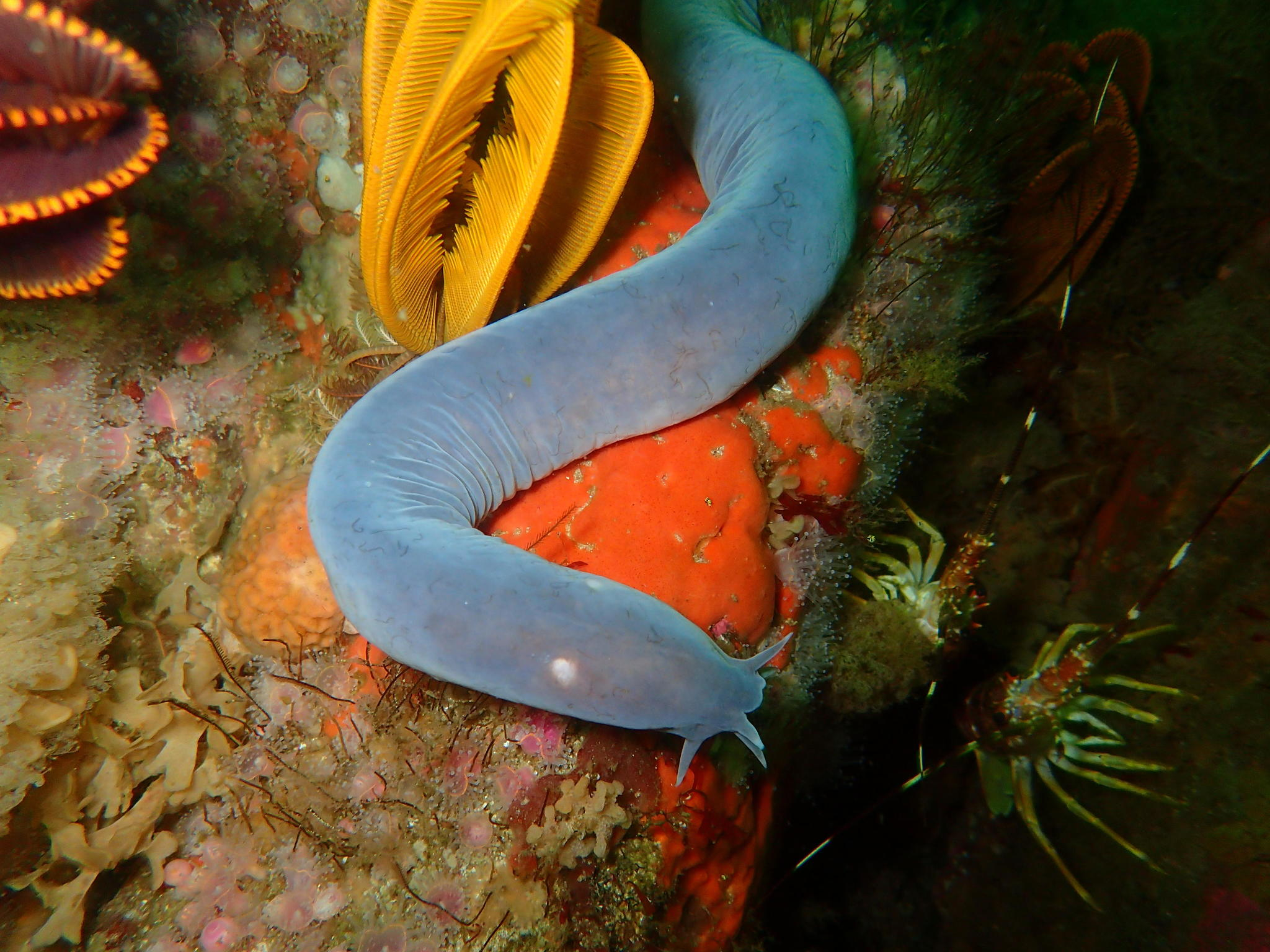
- Off False Bay, South Africa

Conservation status
- Least Concern (IUCN 3.1)

Scientific classification
- Kingdom: Animalia
- Phylum: Chordata
- Infraphylum: Agnatha
- Superclass: Cyclostomi
- Class: Myxini
- Order: Myxiniformes
- Family: Myxinidae
- Genus: Eptatretus
- Species: E. hexatrema

Binomial name
- Eptatretus hexatrema (Müller, 1836)

Synonyms
- Bdellostoma hexatrema Müller 1836; Heptatretus hexatremus (Müller 1836); Hexatrema hexatremum (Müller 1836); Bdellostoma heterotremum Müller 1836; Heterotrema heterotremum (Müller 1836)

= Eptatretus hexatrema =

Species of jawless fish

Eptatretus hexatrema, the sixgill hagfish, or snotslang is a species of marine fish in the hagfish family (family Myxinidae) of order Myxiniformes. It is native to the South Atlantic Ocean and southwestern Indian Ocean.

== Distribution ==
Southeast Atlantic: known only from Walvis Bay, Namibia to Durban, South Africa

== Description ==
Maximum recorded length 80.0 cm. Depth of body 15 times total length. Six gill openings. Colour slaty grey. Egg cases ovoid about 30mm long by 12mm wide with anchor filaments at each end. Eel shaped, with six barbels on the head around the mouth. Epatches form white spots under the skin. Two rows of slime pores under the body. No paired fins, mouth has no jaws but has two protrusible rows of horny teeth.

== Habitat and behaviour ==
Non-migratory marine demersal. Depth range 10 – 400 m, usually found between 10 and 45 m. Commonly burrows in muddy bottoms. Feeds mostly by scavenging on dead or disabled fish. Secretes large quantities of slime when provoked.

== Importance to humans ==
No commercial value, considered a pest by fishermen.

== Conservation status ==
Least concern

== Name ==
Etymology: Eptatretus: Greek, epta = seven + Greek, tretos = with holes. hexatrema: ? .

Common names: sixgill hagfish, snotslang

Synonyms: Bdellostoma hexatrema Müller, 1836. Heptatretus hexatrema (Müller, 1836)
