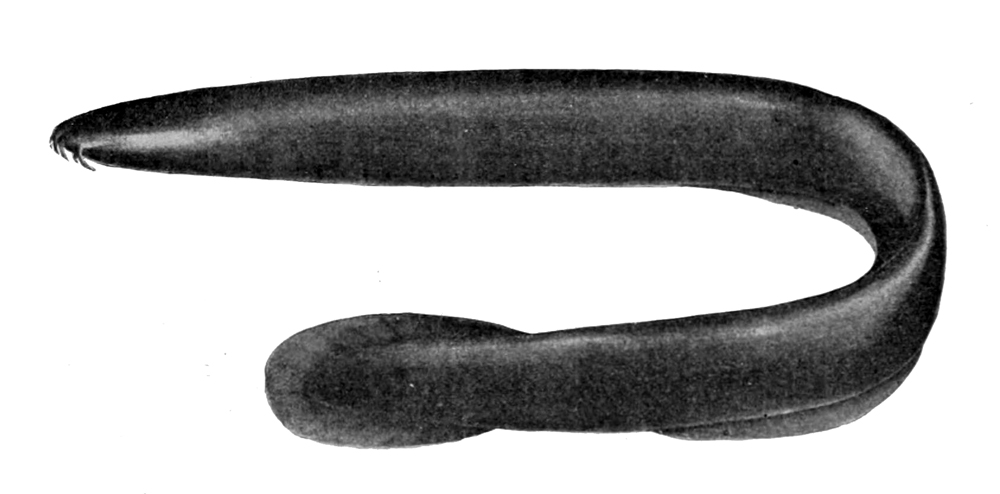

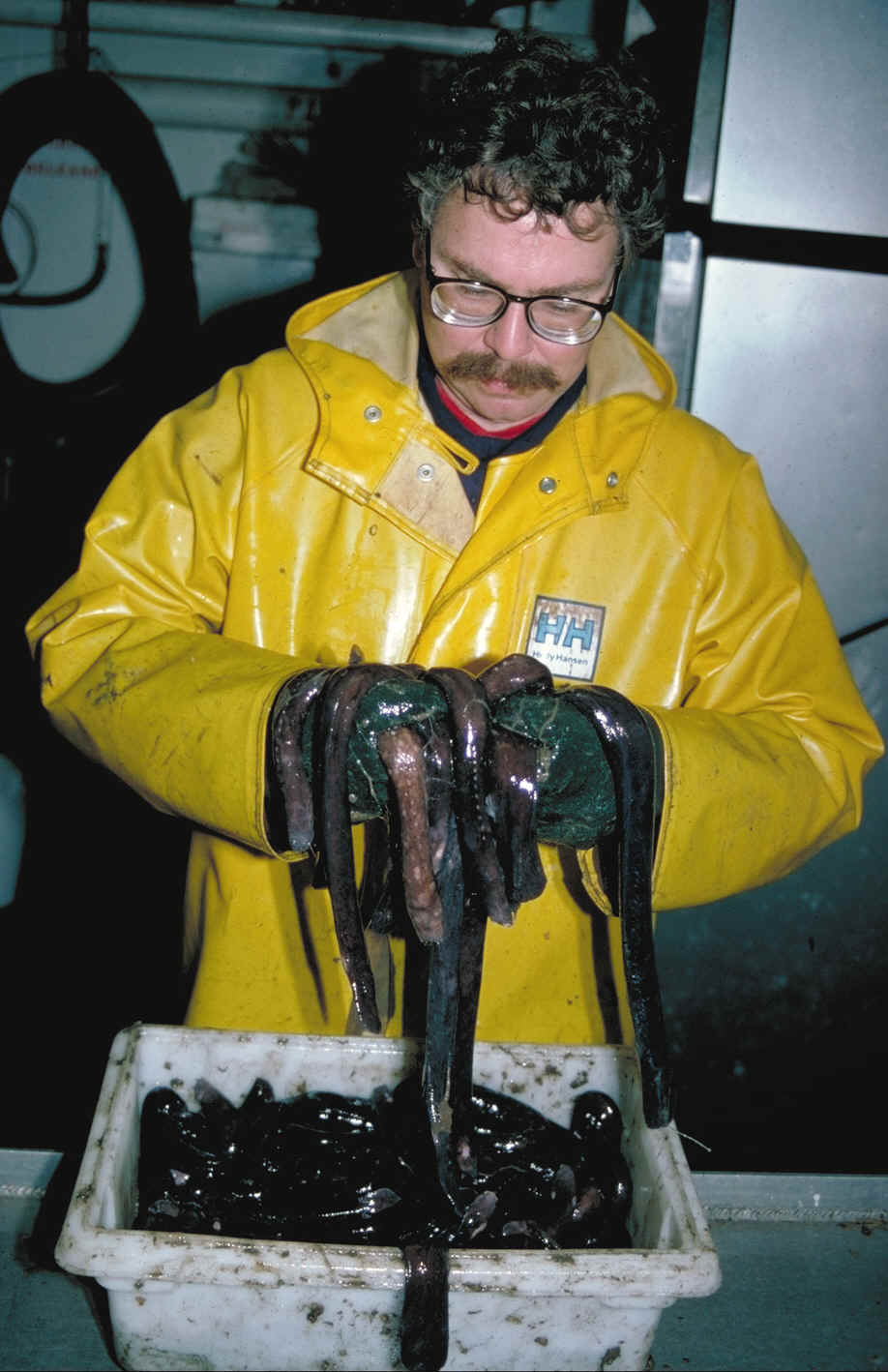

Conservation status
- Data Deficient (IUCN 3.1)

Scientific classification
- Kingdom: Animalia
- Phylum: Chordata
- Infraphylum: Agnatha
- Class: Myxini
- Order: Myxiniformes
- Family: Myxinidae
- Genus: Eptatretus
- Species: E. deani

Binomial name
- Eptatretus deani (Evermann & Goldsborough, 1907)

Synonyms
- Polistotrema curtissjamesi Townsend & Nichols, 1925; Polistotrema deani Evermann & Goldsborough, 1907

= Eptatretus deani =

Black hagfish

Species of jawless fish

Eptatretus deani, the black hagfish, is a species of hagfish.

Common to other species of hagfish, their unusual feeding habits and slime-producing capabilities have led members of the scientific and popular media to dub the hagfish as the most "disgusting" of all sea creatures. Although hagfish are sometimes called "slime eels", they are not eels at all.

== Description ==
This eel-like species is uniform black, or dark brown. It can also appear prune-colored, and often piebald with light spots. The edges of the ventral finfolds and caudal may have a light colour. Unlike the Pacific hagfish, the black hagfish does not have a white ring around their gill pores. It has no true fins, but instead, one dorsal finfold, far back on its body. It has a moderately broad and round caudal, with ray-like markings. The ventral finfold is very low. The black hagfish is scaleless, and ranges from 30–89 cm (12–35 in), with an average maximum overall length of 64 cm (25 in).

This species has four hearts, and 10 to 14 pairs of gill pores. They also have rudimentary eyes. Although they have poor vision, they have a highly developed sense of smell and touch. The head of this species has one, large nostril, and eight barbels that surround the mouth and nostril. They have two parallel rows of horny teeth.

== Distribution ==
Black hagfish are strictly marine, and are found in the Eastern Pacific from southeastern Alaska to central Baja California, and Mexico. These Bathydemersal fish live in the mesopelagic to abyssal Pacific Ocean, near the ocean floor between depths of 103 and 2,743 metres (338 and 8,999 ft).

== Behaviour ==
Like other hagfish, this species attacks hook-caught or trap-caught fish. They burrow into the prey's body to consume the flesh and viscera within. They also feed on carcases of fish that have died and sunk to the ocean floor.

== Uses ==
In many parts of the world, including the US, hagfish skin is used for clothing, belts, or other accessories. In the United States, the black hagfish has been trapped for commercial purposes. Trapping in Oregon began in October, 1988 in Newport. The hagfish are frozen whole, at sea, and then shipped to South Korea.

Recent studies have shown that hagfish slime has similar properties of spider silk, strong and light. If hagfish slime could be replicated in laboratories it could replace artificial materials, like nylon, in women's stockings and workout pants. This would ultimately be better for the environment since nylon is produced from petroleum, and hagfish slime threads could be implanted into bacterium and grown with no harm to the environment.

== Egg characteristics ==
Mature females usually contain up to 42 eggs. The average is 4 eggs over 5 mm long. Mature black hagfish females often contain various sized groups of eggs—sometimes having three distinct size groups. Contained in a typical gonad might be: one group with eggs from 19 – 22 mm, another group with eggs ranging from 1 – 4 mm, and a third group of eggs less than 1mm long. Ovaries often contain over 200 eggs, each less than 1 mm.

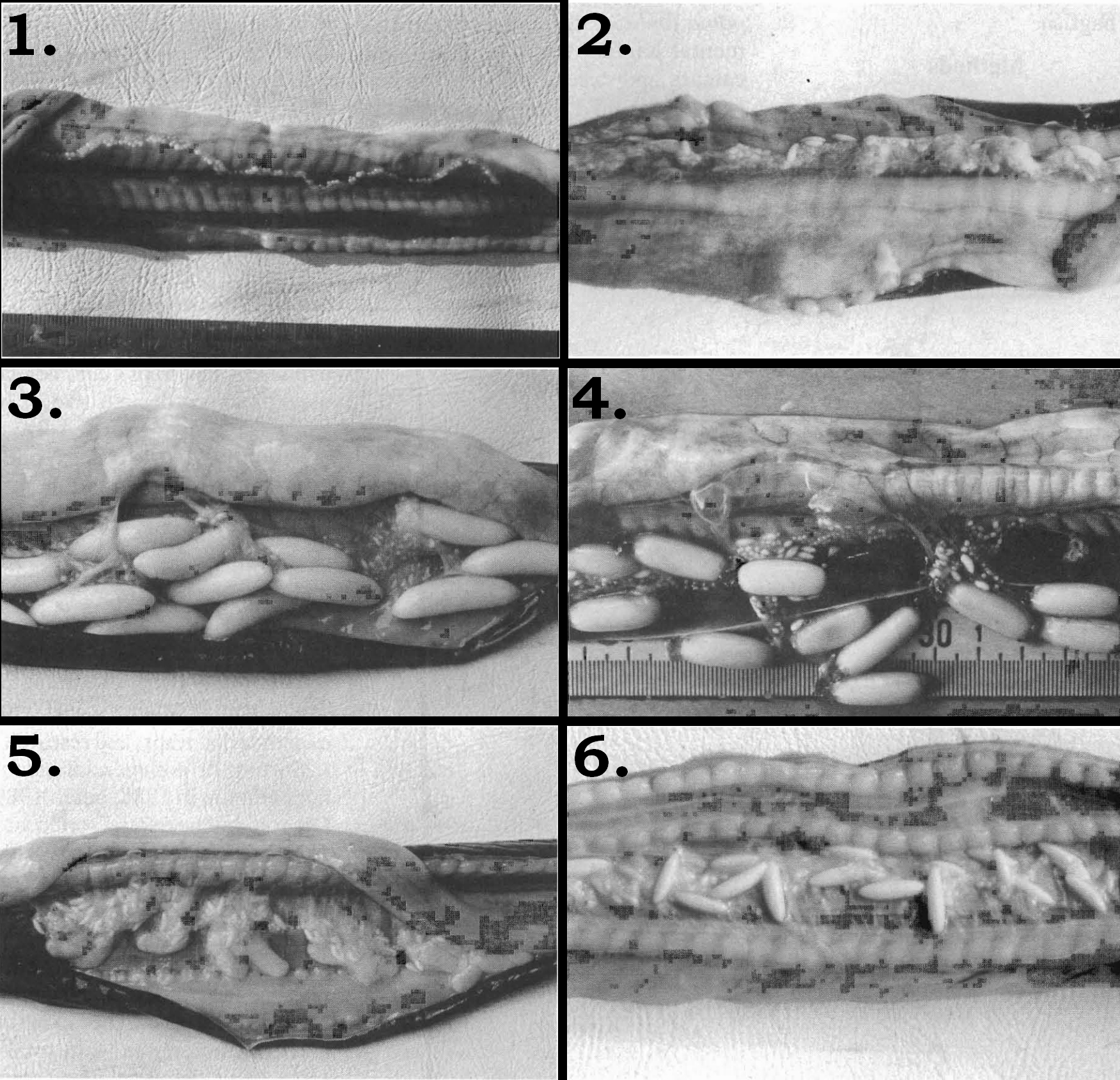
Development of eggs in mature female hagfish gonads

=== Gonad stages ===
The adjacent image shows the various stages of egg development:

- 1. Eggs in an immature female. All eggs are less than 1 mm long, round, and are present along the length of gonad.
- 2. Maturing female. Oblong eggs, most less than 5 mm long, with a few longer than 1 mm.
- 3. Mature ova in developing female. Some eggs are longer than 5 mm.
- 4. Mature ova in developed female. At both ends of egg, hooks are present.
- 5. Mature, spent female showing large, empty ovarian capsules (and some oblong eggs).
- 6. Showing three different size groups of eggs in gonad.

== Slime ==
Black hagfish produce copious amounts of slime as a defense mechanism. Deep-sea diving equipment is known to have been fouled by large amounts of hagfish slime near the bottom of the ocean, extruded by the eel-like fish when they are alarmed. The slime comprises mature thread cells, up to 10 cm (4 in) long that are coiled and thread-like.
