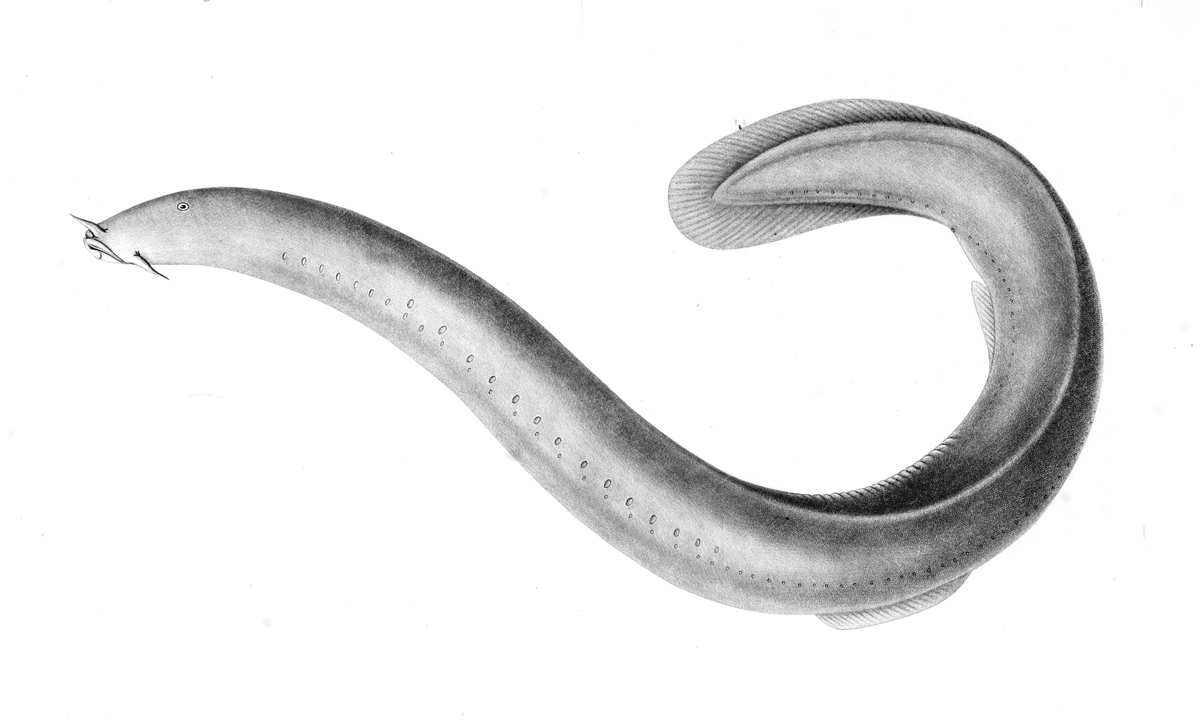

Conservation status
- Data Deficient (IUCN 3.1)

Scientific classification
- Kingdom: Animalia
- Phylum: Chordata
- Infraphylum: Agnatha
- Class: Myxini
- Order: Myxiniformes
- Family: Myxinidae
- Genus: Eptatretus
- Species: E. polytrema

Binomial name
- Eptatretus polytrema Girard, 1855

Synonyms
- Bdellostoma polytremum Girard, 1855; Dodecatrema polytremum (Girard 1855); Polytrema polytremum (Girard 1855); ?Gastrobranche dombey Lacépède 1798; Gasterobranchus dombeyi (sic) Lacépède 1798 ex Shaw 1804; Gastrobranchus dombeyi Lacépède 1798 ex Shaw 1804; Diporobranchia dombey (Lacépède 1798); Eptatretus dombey (Lacépède 1798) Duméril 1819; Heptatrema dombey (Lacépède 1798); Heptatretus dombey (Lacépède 1798)

= Eptatretus polytrema =

Species of jawless fish

Eptatretus polytrema, the fourteen-gill hagfish or Chilean hagfish, is a demersal and non-migratory hagfish of the genus Eptatretus. It is found in muddy and rocky bottoms of the southeastern area of the Pacific Ocean near the coast of Chile between Coquimbo and Puerto Montt, at depths between 10 and 350 m. This hagfish can reach a length of 93 cm.
