= Eptatretus goliath =

Conservation status
- Data Deficient (IUCN 3.1)

Scientific classification
- Kingdom: Animalia
- Phylum: Chordata
- Infraphylum: Agnatha
- Superclass: Cyclostomi
- Class: Myxini
- Order: Myxiniformes
- Family: Myxinidae
- Genus: Eptatretus
- Species: E. goliath

Binomial name
- Eptatretus goliath Mincarone & Stewart, 2006

Species of jawless fish

Eptatretus goliath, also known as the goliath hagfish, is the largest species of hagfish. It is native to the subtropical coast of the Northern island of New Zealand in marine benthic habitats. It is found at depths of around 811 meters. The scientific name "goliath" comes from the biblical character Goliath of Gath, a large Philistine warrior who was killed by David.

The holotype specimen was an adult female found at a depth of 811 meters at the head of the Hauraki canyon. It measured 1,275 millimeters and had dozens of small eggs attached to the body wall. The holotype had a weight of 6.2 kilograms. This species has 7 pairs of gill pouches, 3 multicusps in the anterior and posterior rows and an eel like body.

== Habitat ==
It lives in the Southwest Pacific Ocean off the coast of New Zealand, the northernmost part of the Northern island. The holotype was caught off the Hauraki canyon.
