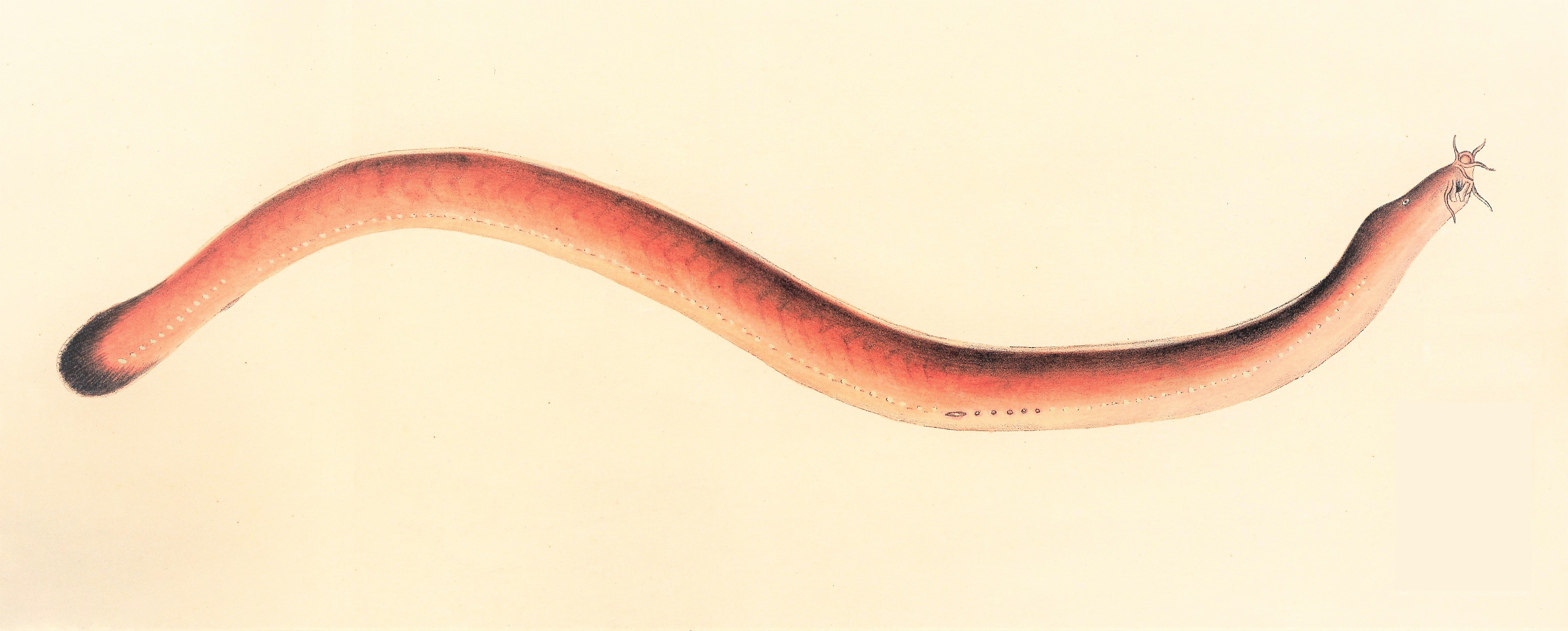

Conservation status
- Least Concern (IUCN 3.1)

Scientific classification
- Kingdom: Animalia
- Phylum: Chordata
- Infraphylum: Agnatha
- Class: Myxini
- Order: Myxiniformes
- Family: Myxinidae
- Genus: Eptatretus
- Species: E. cirrhatus

Binomial name
- Eptatretus cirrhatus (J. R. Forster, 1801)

Synonyms
- Petromyzon cirrhatus Forster 1801; Homea banksii Fleming 1822; Eptatretus banksii (Fleming 1822); Heptatremus banksii (Fleming 1822); Bdellostoma forsteri Müller 1836; Bdellostoma heptatrema Müller 1836

= Broadgilled hagfish =

Species of jawless fish

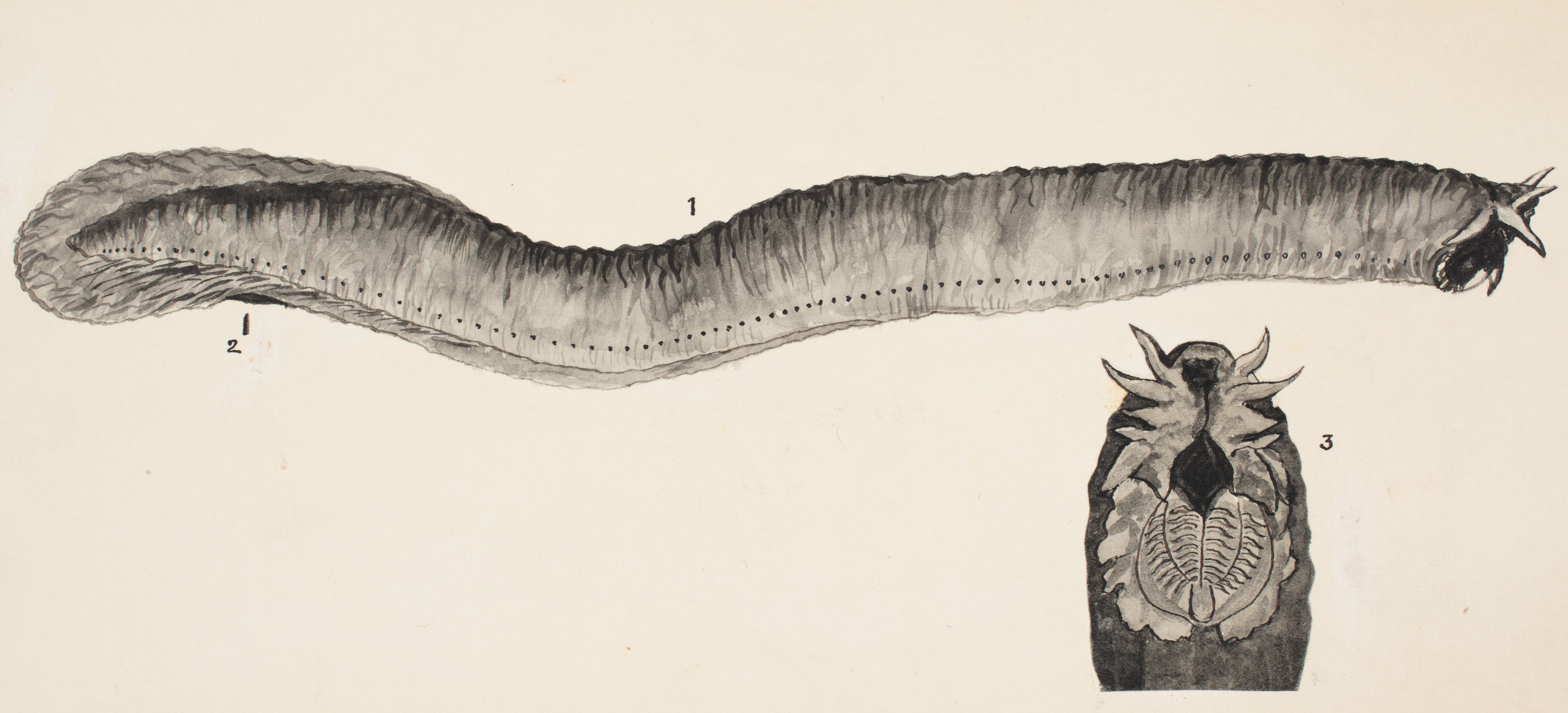
1920s illustration of the body and mouth by Louis Thomas Griffin

The broadgilled hagfish or New Zealand hagfish (Eptatretus cirrhatus), also known by its Māori language name tuere, is a hagfish found around New Zealand and the Chatham Islands as well as around the south and east coasts of Australia, at depths between 1 and 900 metres.

== Description ==
Eptatretus cirrhatus has an eel-like body with no dorsal fin, a paddle-like tail and are often a grey-brown with a pink or bluish tinge of colour. As with all other hagfish, the New Zealand hagfish has a skull but no jaw or true vertebral column, it instead has a skeleton made up of cartilage. The rounded mouth of the hagfish is surrounded by 6 barbels, above that is their singular nasal passage and just inside the mouth is a dental plate with a row of posterior and anterior keratinous grasping teeth on each side. It has seven pairs of gill pouches and forming a line down both the lower sides of its body are pores which often many of them are ringed with a white colour and are used for secreting a snot-like slime which expands out once it has contact with the sea water. Juveniles are lighter in colour.

== Distribution ==
=== Natural global range ===
General hagfish are found around the world in waters below 22 degrees Celsius. E. cirrhatus has a range that includes the western Pacific and stretches down the east coast of Australia from Queensland to Tasmania as well as throughout New Zealand from the North Cape to Snares Shelf and around the Chatham Islands.

=== New Zealand range ===
E. cirrhatus is found in coastal areas of New Zealand in shelf and slope areas along the coast with frequent sighting in Kaikoura. It is also found on rises and banks out in the open ocean. Their New Zealand range includes the Chatham Islands.

=== Habitat preferences ===
The New Zealand hagfish is common throughout the temperate coastal shelves, in depths ranging between 1m and 900m. The hagfish is most common between 90 and 700m. "All known Hagfish species live in close proximity to the bottom, either resting on the substrate or occupying burrows."

== Life cycle/phenology ==
In a study done on the reproductive stages, there was no indication found that Eptatretus cirrhatus breeds cyclically or seasonably as females with large eggs present and postovulatory females were found throughout all seasons of the study. It was suggested that the first female spawning is thought to occur when the total length is between 412mm – 534mm, while Males are thought not to mature until they are about 585mm in length. Not much is yet understood about the gestation period of Eptatretus cirrhatus but they did find a low reproductive rate occurring and therefore issues may arise from commercial fisheries, although they are currently at a 'least concern'. It can take up to 2 or 3 years after maturing for hagfish to produce only 20–30 eggs. Embryo development is slow with early stages developing at only 7 months in some species of hagfish. "The ovary is found in the anterior portion of the gonad, and the testis is found in the posterior part." Reyes indicates four outcomes can happen during development that determines the sex of an individual. If the anterior part develops then the individual is female if the posterior part develops the individual is male. If neither develops the individual becomes sterile. If the individual develops both then the individual becomes a hermaphrodite, research is currently being undertaken to determine where hermaphrodites are to be considered functioning or not.

== Diet and foraging ==
E. cirrhatus are bottom feeders and are known to eat their prey from the inside out. Their diet mainly consists of carrion, although they prey on live animals as well. Hagfish play an important role in the ecosystem, recycling nutrients contained in carcasses that sink to the sea floor. As the hagfish are practically blind except for their sensitivity to light they rely on the 6 sensory barbels that surround their mouths to find their way along the ocean floor and their singular nasal passageway to smell out their prey. Hagfish have a unique dental plate inside of their mouths with a row of posterior and anterior keratinous grasping teeth on each side. This dental plate folds bilaterally helping with the grasping motion hagfish use to eat their prey. The dental plate protrudes out and folds onto the flesh of the prey and then retracts back into the hagfish's mouth. It may also use its slime to suffocate its prey though this is mostly used as a defense against predators. The moment a predator grasps a hagfish it will project slime out of its pores, causing the predator to choke. The slime clogs the gills and therefore restricts the rate at which the predator can circulate water to breathe.

For many years, it was believed that E. cirrhatus was a scavenger and opportunistic feeder. However, it was realised that the energy demands of the population were too large to be maintained by scavenging alone. Research done in the last decade has shown that hagfish can and do hunt. E. cirrhatus feeds on the third trophic level (three levels above primary producers). The diet is a variety of invertebrates and includes hermit crabs, shrimps, sharks and bony fish. When hunting the hagfish locates a burrow occupied by potential prey. It then enters the burrow and is believed to grab the prey. It is then thought that hagfish may suffocate its prey by producing an excess of slime. To extract the prey from the burrow E. cirrhatus ties itself into a knot which in turn increases the surface area of contact with the ocean floor and acts as leverage for pulling the prey out.

== Predators, parasites and diseases ==
E. cirrhatus secretes a slime that acts as a deterrent to predators. Hagfish are hunted by marine mammals and sharks as well as large fish. However, hagfish combat this predation with the slime that they secrete. When grabbed by a predator, the slime fills the mouth and gill chamber. These trigger a gagging response in the predator, thus forcing them to let go of the hagfish. This deters further attack as well, though it is unknown whether there is a toxic compound within the slime and what further effect this has on the predator. Marine mammals and octopuses do not have gills that can be clogged by slime. This slime is made in pores along the sides of hagfish and contains protein threads. These are coiled when contained in cells, but upon release reacts with salt water and expands. This is what causes the slime to fill the mouth. The excretion of the slime appears to have no effect on E. cirrhatus, as it continues foraging despite attacks. This is considered unusual behaviour as in most animals they would be more alert for potential danger or in timid species, run or hide at the threat of danger. Hagfish just keep eating with no change in behaviour again providing an adaptive advantage as instead of using energy on flight, the organism can gain energy from its food.

It is possible that the slime that is secreted by hagfish could, like in more evolved species, as protection against pathogens and parasites.

Whales may be a major predator of E. cirrhatus. During the height of the whaling industry in New Zealand in the late 18th and early 19th centuries, hagfish populations exploded.

== Cultural uses ==
E. cirrhatus is a traditional food for Māori and is considered a delicacy. In modern times, some iwi serve E. cirrhatus for special occasions.

Commercially hagfish are considered a delicacy in Korea and Japan. This has led to small-scale fishing in New Zealand to supply this market. The skin is used to produce eel skin leather. This industry has no regulations unlike many others because of a large number of unknown factors about hagfish life cycles. It is difficult to regulate when the size of the population is unknown as well as the growth and fertility rate. This makes the industries sustainability questionable and has led to a lot of research into hagfish reproduction. But due to the depth at which this species inhabits and the difficulty in observing their behaviour limited knowledge has been gained.

== Other uses ==
Biometrics research work has pursued applications of the protein fibres within hagfish slime. Douglas Fudge, then head of the University of Guelph hagfish slime research team, stated that when dried, the fibres within the slime become like silk: very thin and strong. (Fudge is now at Chapman University.) "Hagfish slime is made up of two parts: mucus and tiny fibres, about 15 cm long but only a micron wide." These fibres could be a natural, renewable alternative to non-renewable, petroleum-derived fabrics, like nylon and spandex. While no one has yet extracted the proteins to make a spool of hagfish thread, Fudge and his team propose that in the future, these proteins will extracted and made into eco-friendly clothing such as athletic wear; or because of their strength, even bulletproof vests.
