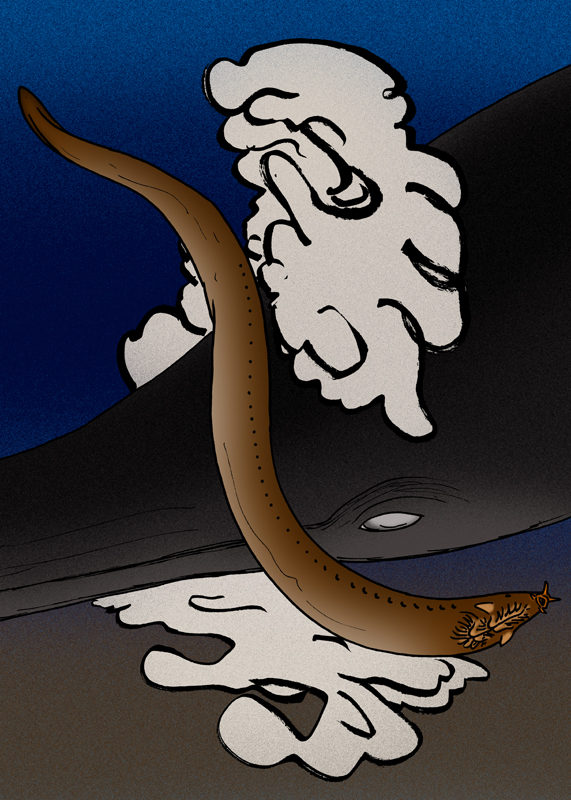
- Reconstruction with Scapanorhynchus

Scientific classification
- Kingdom: Animalia
- Phylum: Chordata
- Infraphylum: Agnatha
- Superclass: Cyclostomi
- Class: Myxini
- Order: Myxiniformes
- Family: Myxinidae
- Genus: †Tethymyxine; Miyashita et al., 2019
- Species: †T. tapirostrum

Binomial name
- †Tethymyxine tapirostrum Miyashita et al., 2019

= Tethymyxine =

Tethymyxine Temporal range: Cenomanian

Extinct genus of hagfish

Tethymyxine is an extinct genus of hagfish known from the Late Cretaceous (Cenomanian) of Lebanon. It contains a single species, Tethymyxine tapirostrum, known from a single fossil specimen.

It is the oldest crown group hagfish known from fossil remains. It is known from Hjoula, a prominent outcrop of the Sannine Formation. As its specific epithet suggests, this formation consists of sediments from the ancient Tethys Ocean, and is a lagerstätte with numerous extremely well-preserved specimens, including soft-bodied animals such as hagfish that are otherwise rarely fossilized.

Tethymyxine's fossil preserves a row of 133 slime glands, indicating its close relationship to modern hagfish, although it has some notable differences, such as smaller facial tentacles, a more anterior branchial pouch, and a less-expanded caudal fin. The presence of slime glands indicates that hagfish slime may have originally evolved as a defense against now-extinct marine predators such as plesiosaurs and ichthyosaurs.

The anatomical traits of Tethymyxine most closely resemble the extant basal hagfish genus Rubicundus, indicating that both may be sister taxa. The common ancestor of both is thought to have diverged from the rest of the Myxinidae during the Late Jurassic, and the Tethymyxine and Rubicundus lineages are thought to have diverged in the Early Cretaceous.
