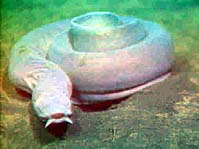
- Eptatretus stoutii

Scientific classification
- Kingdom: Animalia
- Phylum: Chordata
- Infraphylum: Agnatha
- Class: Myxini
- Order: Myxiniformes
- Family: Myxinidae
- Subfamily: Eptatretinae
- Genus: Eptatretus; Cloquet, 1819

Type species
- Gastrobranche dombey Lacépède, 1798

Synonyms
- Bdellostoma Mueller 1835; Dodecatrema Fowler 1947; Myxine (Heptatrema) Voigt 1832; Heptatrema Dumeril 1832 ex Voigt 1832; Petromyzon (Heptatremus) Swainson 1839; Heterotrema Girard 1855 non Fiedler 1889; Hexabranchus Schultze 1836 non Ehrenberg 1831; Hexatrema Girard, 1855; Homea Fleming 1822; Polistotrema Gill ex Jordan & Gilbert 1881; Polytrema Girard, 1855 non Rafinesque 1819 non Ferussac 1822 non D'Orbigny 1850 non Risso 1826 non Hickson 1911 non Clarke 1908; Paramyxine Dean 1904; Quadratus Wisner 1999 non Thiergart & Frantz 1962; Heptatretus Regan 1912; Diporobranchia Latreille 1825

= Eptatretus =

Genus of jawless fishes

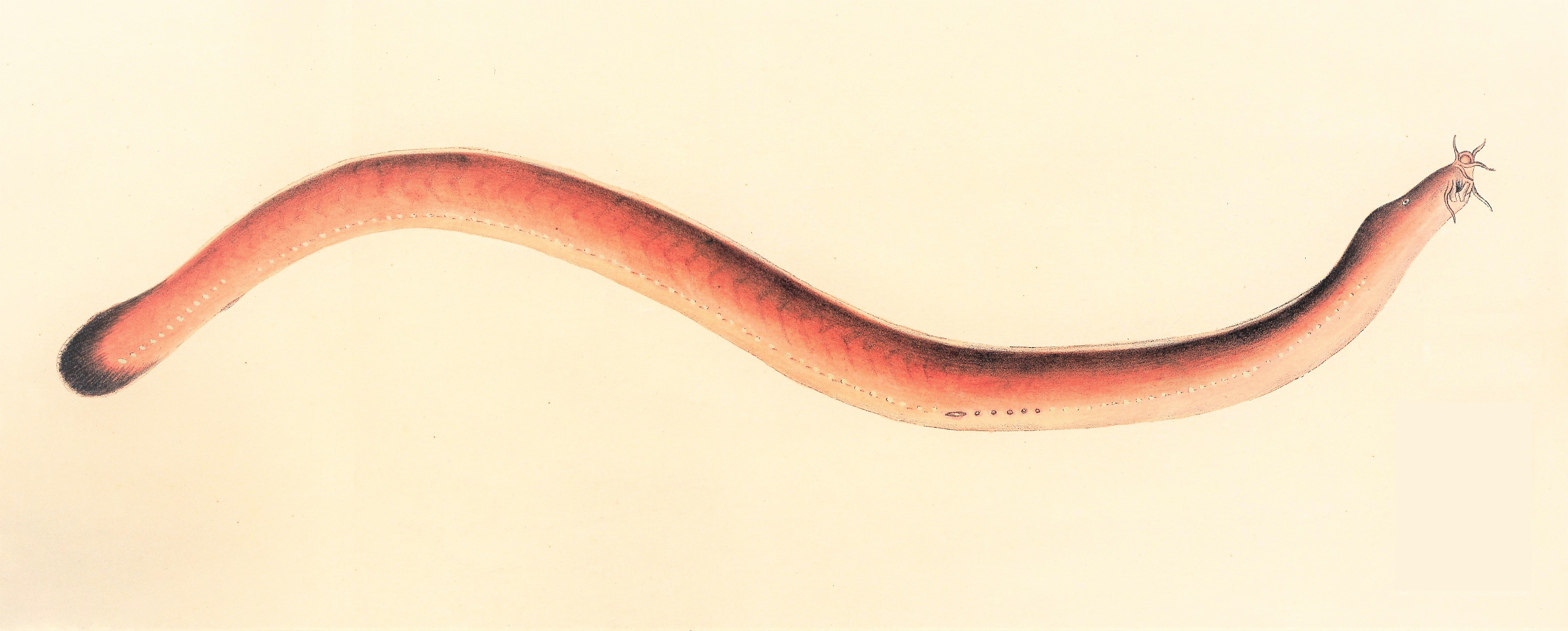
Drawing of Eptatretus cirrhatus

Eptatretus is a large genus of hagfish having multiple gill openings, but lacking the elongated snout that is a diagnostic feature of hagfish in genus Rubicundus.

== Species ==
There are currently 50 recognized species in this genus:

- Eptatretus aceroi Polanco Fernández & Fernholm, 2014 (Acero's hagfish)
- Eptatretus alastairi Mincarone & Fernholm, 2010 (Alastair's hagfish)
- Eptatretus ancon H. K. Mok, Saavedra-Diaz & Acero P, 2001
- Eptatretus astrolabium Fernholm & Mincarone, 2010 (Astrolabe hagfish)
- Eptatretus atami Dean, 1904 (Brown hagfish)
- Eptatretus bischoffii A. F. Schneider, 1880 (Bischoff's hagfish)
- Eptatretus bobwisneri Fernholm, Norén, S. O. Kullander, Quattrini, Zintzen, C. D. Roberts, H. K. Mok & C. H. Kuo, 2013 (Bob Wisner's hagfish)
- Eptatretus burgeri Girard, 1855 (Inshore hagfish)
- Eptatretus caribbeaus Fernholm, 1982 (Fernholm's Caribbean hagfish)
- Eptatretus carlhubbsi C. B. McMillan & Wisner, 1984 (Giant hagfish)
- Eptatretus cheni S. C. Shen & H. J. Tao, 1975
- Eptatretus chinensis C. H. Kuo & H. K. Mok, 1994 (Taiwanese hagfish)
- Eptatretus cirrhatus J. R. Forster, 1801 (Broadgilled hagfish)
- Eptatretus cryptus C. D. Roberts & A. L. Stewart, 2015 (Cryptic hagfish)
- Eptatretus deani Evermann & Goldsborough, 1907 (Black hagfish)
- Eptatretus fritzi Wisner & C. B. McMillan, 1990 (Guadalupe hagfish)
- Eptatretus goliath Mincarone & D. J. Stewart, 2006 (Goliath hagfish)
- Eptatretus gomoni Mincarone & Fernholm, 2010 (Gomon's hagfish)
- Eptatetrus goslinei Mincarone, Plachetzki, McCord, Winegard, Fernholm, Gonzalez & Fudge, 2021
- Eptatretus grouseri C. B. McMillan, 1999 (Galapagos hagfish)
- Eptatretus hexatrema J. P. Müller, 1836 (Sixgill hagfish)
- Eptatretus indrambaryai Wongratana, 1983 (Bengal hagfish)
- Eptatretus laurahubbsae C. B. McMillan & Wisner, 1984 (Juan Fernandez hagfish)
- Eptatretus longipinnis Strahan, 1975 (Longfinned hagfish)
- Eptatretus luzonicus Fernholm, Norén, S. O. Kullander, Quattrini, Zintzen, C. D. Roberts, H. K. Mok & C. H. Kuo, 2013 (Luzon hagfish)
- Eptatretus mcconnaugheyi Wisner & C. B. McMillan, 1990 (Shorthead hagfish)
- Eptatretus mccoskeri C. B. McMillan, 1999 (McMillan's hagfish)
- Eptatretus mendozai Hensley, 1985 (Mendoza's hagfish)
- Eptatretus menezesi Mincarone, 2000 (Santa Catarina hagfish)
- Eptatretus minor Fernholm & C. L. Hubbs, 1981
- Eptatretus moki C. B. McMillan & Wisner, 2004 (Mok's hagfish)
- Eptatretus multidens Fernholm & C. L. Hubbs, 1981
- Eptatretus nanii Wisner & C. B. McMillan, 1988 (Valparaiso hagfish)
- Eptatretus nelsoni C. H. Kuo, K. F. Huang & H. K. Mok, 1994 (Nelson's hagfish)
- Eptatretus octatrema Barnard, 1923 (Eightgill hagfish)
- Eptatretus okinoseanus Dean, 1904 (Sagami hagfish)
- Eptatretus poicilus Zintzen & C. D. Roberts, 2015 (Mottled hagfish)
- Eptatretus polytrema Girard, 1855 (Fourteen-gill hagfish)
- Eptatretus profundus Barnard, 1923 (Fivegill hagfish)
- Eptatretus sheni C. H. Kuo, K. F. Huang & H. K. Mok, 1994
- Eptatretus sinus Wisner & C. B. McMillan, 1990 (Cortez hagfish)
- Eptatretus springeri Bigelow & Schroeder, 1952 (Gulf hagfish)
- Eptatretus stoutii Lockington, 1878 (Pacific hagfish)
- Eptatretus strahani C. B. McMillan & Wisner, 1984 (Strahan's hagfish)
- Eptatretus strickrotti Møller & W. J. Jones, 2007 (Strickrott's hagfish)
- Eptatretus taiwanae S. C. Shen & H. J. Tao, 1975 (Taiwan hagfish)
- Eptatretus walkeri C. B. McMillan & Wisner, 2004
- Eptatretus wayuu H. K. Mok, Saavedra-Diaz & Acero P, 2001 (Honshu hagfish)
- Eptatretus wandoensis (Five-gilled white mid-dorsal line hagfish) Song Y. S. & Kim J-K, 2020
- Eptatretus yangi Teng, 1958
