= Bo Fernholm =

Swedish zoologist (born 1941)

- Born: Bo Enar Fernholm; 16 July 1941 (age 85)
- Education: Stockholm University
- Known for: Hagfish research
- Scientific career
- Fields: Zoology, Ichthyology
- Workplaces: Natural History Museum, Stockholm; Roskilde University
- Author abbrev. (zoology): Fernholm

Bo Enar Fernholm (born 16 July 1941) is a Swedish zoologist and professor emeritus of vertebrate zoology at the Swedish Museum of Natural History in Stockholm. His research specializes in hagfish.

== Biography ==
Fernholm studied zoology, botany, pedagogy, and mathematics at Stockholm University, completing his doctoral dissertation on hagfish in 1972. He conducted postdoctoral research on hagfish at Tokyo University in Japan (1972–1973) and at the Scripps Institution of Oceanography (1979–1980). From 1975 to 1976, he served as curator of the fish collection at the Swedish Museum of Natural History before accepting a professorship in biology at Roskilde University in Denmark (1976–1982). In 1982, he returned to the museum, serving until 2002 as professor of vertebrate systematics and head of the vertebrate unit, occasionally chairing the museum's zoological department. He led the work on the Swedish node of the Global Biodiversity Information Facility (GBIF) at the museum from 2003 to 2005.

Beyond his museum work, Fernholm has served on the boards of the Kristineberg Marine Research Station (1984–1993) and the Abisko Scientific Research Station (2001–2003), as well as on the Swedish National Committee for Biology at the Royal Swedish Academy of Sciences (1985–1995) and the Working Group of Biology (now Life Science Committee) of the Scientific Committee on Antarctic Research (SCAR) from 1990 to 2002. He has represented Sweden in the Convention for the Conservation of Antarctic Marine Living Resources (CCAMLR) and in the International Whaling Commission (IWC).

== Selected publications ==
Fernholm is the author or co-author of 55 scientific papers and 21 popular science publications, and served as co-editor of two books.

== Eponyms ==
Three hagfish species have been named in Fernholm's honor:

- Eptatretus fernholmi McMillan & Wisner, 2004, later renamed Eptatretus luzonicus Fernholm, Norén, Kullander, Quattrini, Zintzen, Roberts, Mok & Kuo, 2013 due to a homonym with Paramyxine fernholmi Kuo, Huang & Mok, 1994
- Myxine fernholmi Wisner & McMillan, 1995
- Eptatretus fernholmi (Kuo, Huang & Mok 1994)
