= Hagfish =

Hagfish Temporal range: Pennsylvanian - Holocene, 311–0 Ma
- Unidentified hagfish observed on seafloor

Scientific classification
- Kingdom: Animalia
- Phylum: Chordata
- Infraphylum: Agnatha
- Superclass: Cyclostomi
- Class: Myxini
- Order: Myxiniformes; Rafinesque, 1815

Type species
- Myxine glutinosa Linnaeus, 1758

Genera
- †Myxinikela Bardack, 1991; Myxinidae; Rubicundinae Fernholm et al., 2013; Rubicundus Fernholm et al., 2013; †Tethymyxine Miyashita et al., 2019; Eptatretinae Bonaparte, 1850; Eptatretus Cloquet, 1819; Myxininae Nelson, 1976; Myxine Linnaeus, 1758; Nemamyxine Richardson, 1958; Neomyxine Richardson, 1953; Notomyxine Nani & Gneri, 1951

Synonyms
- Bdellostomatidae Gill, 1872; Homeidae Garman, 1899; Paramyxinidae Berg, 1940; Diporobranchia Latreille, 1825

Class of eel-shaped, slime-producing animal

Hagfish, of the class Myxini /mɪkˈsaɪnaɪ/ (also known as Hyperotreti) and order Myxiniformes /mɪkˈsɪnɪfɔːrmiːz/, are eel-shaped jawless fish (occasionally called slime eels). Hagfish are the only known living animals that have a skull but no vertebral column; however, they do have rudimentary vertebrae. Hagfish are marine predators and scavengers that can defend themselves against other larger predators by releasing copious amounts of slime from mucous glands in their skin.

Although their exact relationship to the only other living group of jawless fish, the lampreys, was initially the subject of controversy, genetic evidence suggests that hagfish and lampreys are more closely related to each other than to jawed vertebrates, thus forming the superclass Cyclostomi. The oldest-known stem group hagfish are known from the Late Carboniferous, around 310 million years ago, with modern representatives first being recorded in the mid-Cretaceous around 100 million years ago.

== Physical characteristics ==
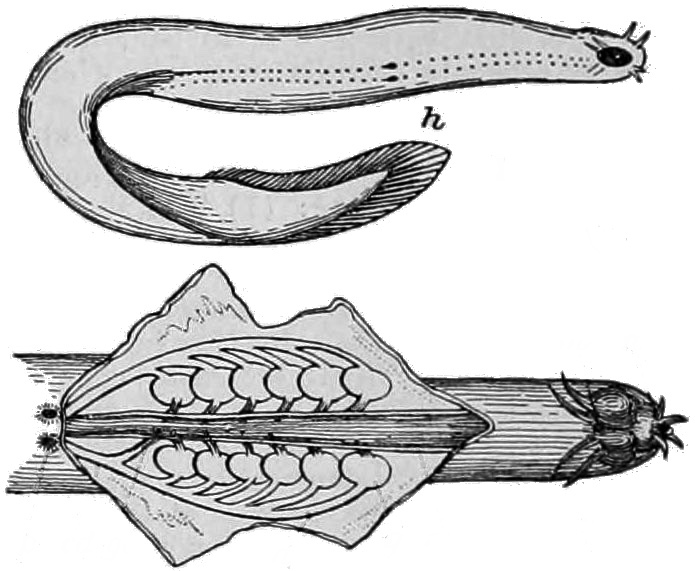
Two views of the hagfish (Myxini glutinosa) with analytical overlays and dissection, published 1905

=== Body features ===
Closeup of the head of a sixgill hagfish (Eptatretus hexatrema)

Hagfish are typically about 50 cm (19.7 in) in length. The largest-known species is Eptatretus goliath, with a specimen recorded at 127 cm (4 ft 2 in), while Myxine kuoi and Myxine pequenoi seem to reach no more than 18 cm (7.1 in). Some have been seen as small as 4 cm (1.6 in).

Hagfish have elongated, eel-like bodies, and paddle-like tails. The skin is naked and covers the body like a loosely fitting sock. They are generally a dull pink color and look quite worm-like. They have cartilaginous skulls (although the part surrounding the brain is composed primarily of a fibrous sheath) and tooth-like structures composed of keratin. Colors depend on the species, ranging from pink to blue-grey, and black or white spots may be present. Eyes are simple eyespots, not lensed eyes that can resolve images. Hagfish have no true fins and have six or eight barbels around the mouth and a single nostril. Instead of vertically articulating jaws like Gnathostomata (vertebrates with jaws), they have a pair of horizontally moving structures with tooth-like projections for pulling off food. The mouth of the hagfish has two pairs of horny, comb-shaped teeth on a cartilaginous plate that protracts and retracts. These teeth are used to grasp food and draw it toward the pharynx.

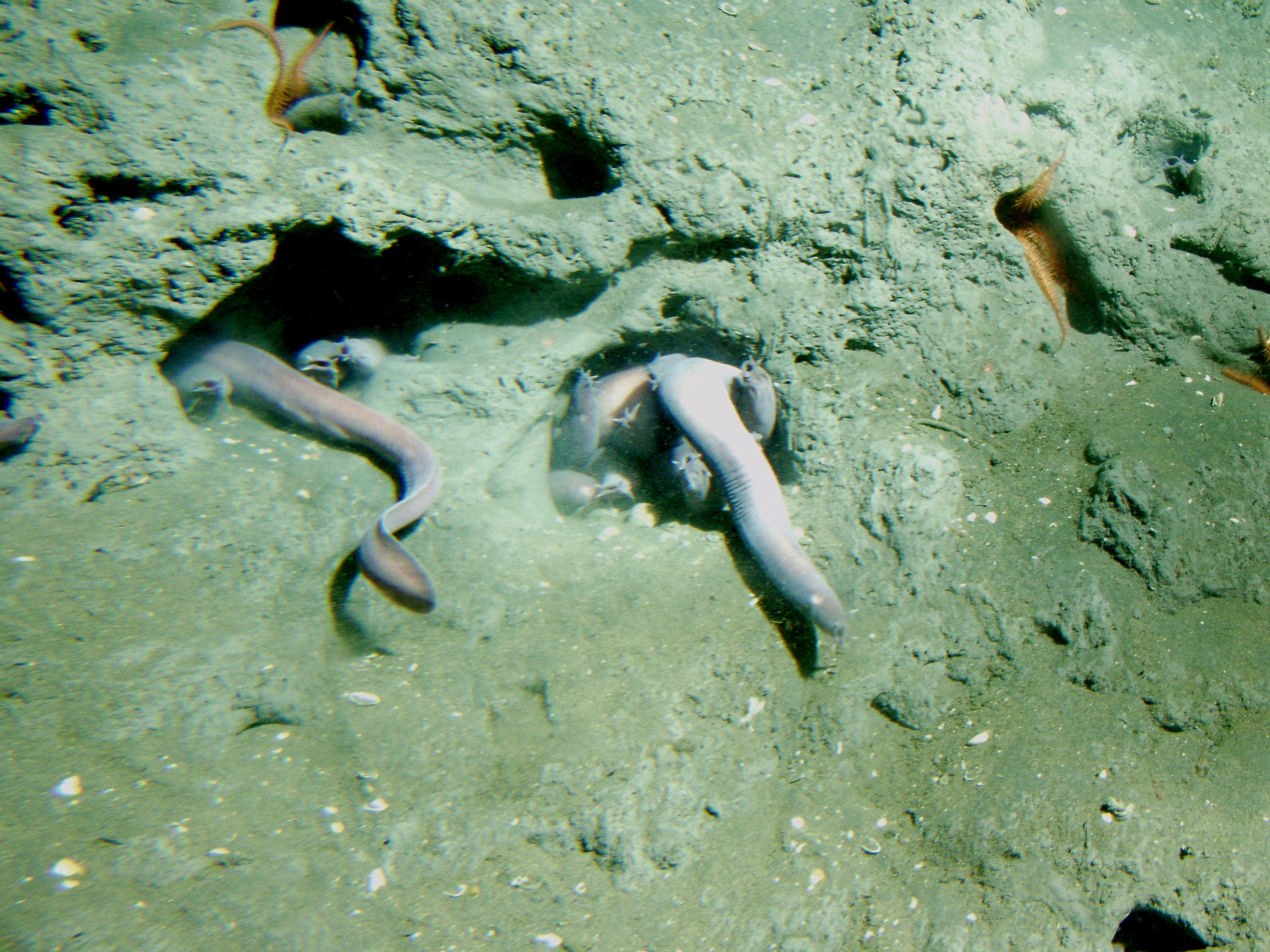
Pacific hagfish at 150 m depth, California, Cordell Bank National Marine Sanctuary

Its skin is attached to the body only along the center ridge of the back and at the slime glands, and is filled with close to a third of the body's blood volume, giving the impression of a blood-filled sack. It is assumed this is an adaptation to survive predator attacks. The Atlantic hagfish, representative of the subfamily Myxininae, and the Pacific hagfish, representative of the subfamily Eptatretinae, differ in that the latter has muscle fibers embedded in the skin. The resting position of the Pacific hagfish also tends to be coiled, while that of the Atlantic hagfish is stretched.

=== Slime ===
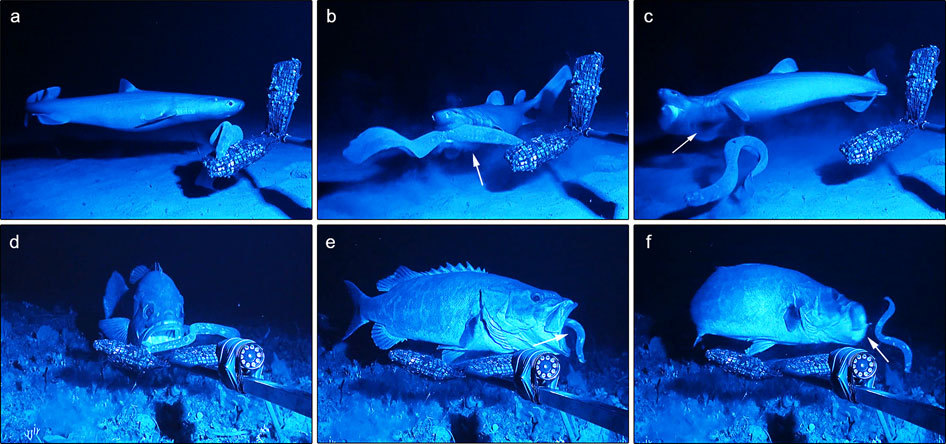
An Atlantic hagfish (Myxine glutinosa) using its slime to get away from a kitefin shark (Dalatias licha) and an Atlantic wreckfish (Polyprion americanus)

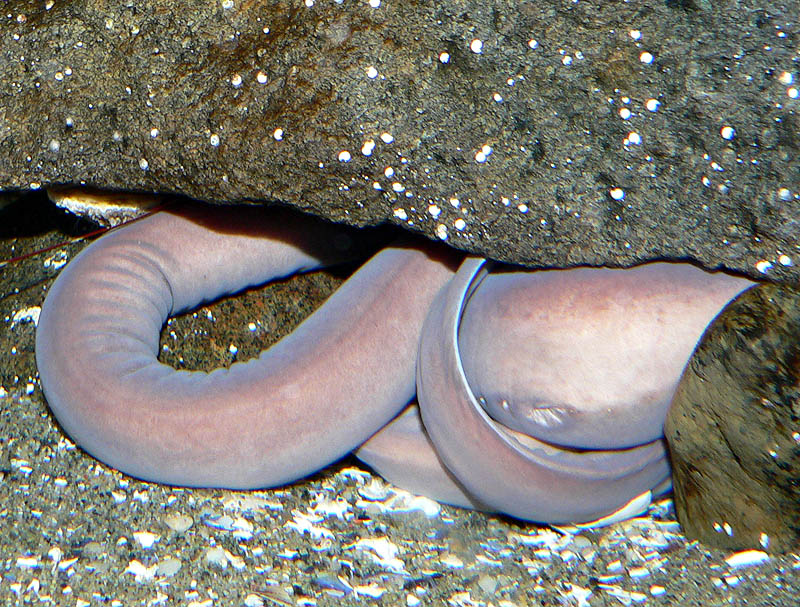
Pacific hagfish trying to hide under a rock

Hagfish can exude copious quantities of a milky and fibrous slime or mucus, from specialized slime glands. When released in seawater, the slime expands to 10,000 times its original size in 0.4 seconds. This slime that hagfish excrete has very thin fibers that make it more durable and retentive than the slime excreted by other animals. The fibers are made of proteins and also make the slime flexible. If they are caught by a predator, they can quickly release a large amount of slime to escape. If they remain captured, they can tie themselves in an overhand knot, and work their way from the head to the tail of the animal, scraping off the slime and freeing themselves from their captor. Rheological investigations showed that hagfish slime viscosity increases in elongational flow which favors gill clogging of suction feeding fish, while its viscosity decreases in shear which facilitates scraping off the slime by the travelling-knot.

Recently, the slime was reported to entrain water in its keratin-like intermediate filaments excreted by gland thread cells, creating a slow-to-dissipate, viscoelastic substance, rather than a simple gel. It has been shown to impair the function of a predator fish's gills. In this case, the hagfish's mucus would clog the predator's gills, disabling their ability to respire. The predator would release the hagfish to avoid suffocation. Because of the mucus, few marine predators target the hagfish. Other predators of hagfish are varieties of birds or mammals.

Free-swimming hagfish also slime when agitated, and later clear the mucus using the same travelling-knot behavior. The reported gill-clogging effect suggests that the travelling-knot behavior is useful or even necessary to restore the hagfish's own gill function after sliming.

Hagfish thread keratin (EsTKα and EsTKγ; Q90501 and Q90502), the protein that make up its slime filaments, is under investigation as an alternative to spider silk for use in applications such as body armor. These alpha-keratin proteins in hagfish slime transform from an α-helical structure to a stiffer β sheet structure when stretched. With combined draw-processing (stretching) and chemical crosslinking, recombinant slime keratin turns into a very strong fiber with an elastic modulus reaching 20 GPa.

When in 2017 a road accident on U.S. Highway 101 resulted in 7,500 pounds (3,400 kg) of hagfish being spilled, they emitted sufficient slime to cover the road and a nearby car.

=== Respiration ===
Specimen Eptatretus wandoensis, gill apertures are labelled "GA"

A hagfish generally respires by taking in water through its pharynx, past the velar chamber, and bringing the water through the internal gill pouches, which can vary in number from five to 16 pairs, depending on species. The gill pouches open individually, but in Myxine, the openings have coalesced, with canals running backwards from each opening under the skin, uniting to form a common aperture on the ventral side known as the branchial opening. The esophagus is also connected to the left branchial opening, which is therefore larger than the right one, through a pharyngocutaneous duct (esophageocutaneous duct), which has no respiratory tissue. This pharyngocutaneous duct is used to clear large particles from the pharynx, a function also partly taking place through the nasopharyngeal canal. In other species, the coalescence of the gill openings is less complete, and in Bdellostoma, each pouch opens separately to the outside, as in lampreys. The unidirectional water flow passing the gills is produced by rolling and unrolling velar folds located inside a chamber developed from the nasohypophyseal tract, and is operated by a complex set of muscles inserting into cartilages of the neurocranium, assisted by peristaltic contractions of the gill pouches and their ducts. Hagfish also have a well-developed dermal capillary network that supplies the skin with oxygen when the animal is buried in anoxic mud, as well as a high tolerance for both hypoxia and anoxia, with a well-developed anaerobic metabolism. Members of the group have spent 36 hours in water completely devoid of dissolved oxygen, and made a complete recovery. The skin has also been suggested to be capable of cutaneous respiration.

=== Nervous system ===
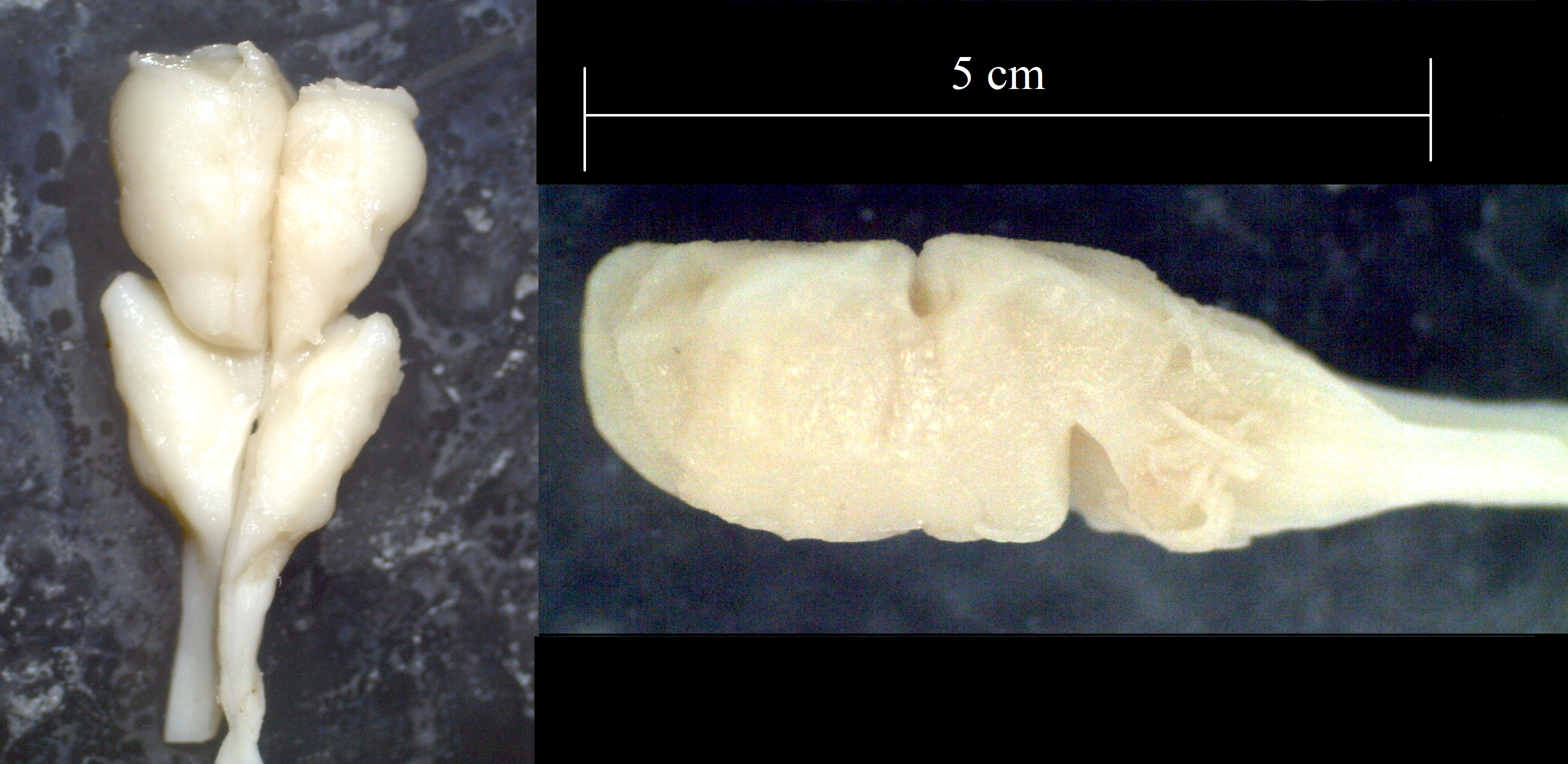
Dorsal / left lateral views of dissected hagfish brain, scale bar added for size

The origins of the vertebrate nervous system are of considerable interest to evolutionary biologists, and cyclostomes (hagfish and lampreys) are an important group for answering this question. The complexity of the hagfish brain has been an issue of debate since the late 19th century, with some morphologists suggesting that they do not possess a cerebellum, while others suggest that it is continuous with the midbrain. It is now considered that the hagfish neuroanatomy is similar to that of lampreys. A common feature of both cyclostomes is the absence of myelin in neurons. The brain of a hagfish has specific parts similar to the brains of other vertebrates. The dorsal and ventral muscles located towards the side of the hagfish body are connected to spinal nerves. The spinal nerves that connect to the muscles of the pharyngeal wall grow individually to reach them.

=== Eye ===
The hagfish eye lacks a lens, extraocular muscles, and the three motor cranial nerves (III, IV, and VI) found in more complex vertebrates, which is significant to the study of the evolution of more complex eyes. A parietal eye is also absent in extant hagfish. Hagfish eyespots, when present, can detect light, but as far as it is known, none can resolve detailed images. In Myxine and Neomyxine, the eyes are partly covered by the trunk musculature. Paleontological evidence suggests that the hagfish eye is not plesiomorphic but rather degenerative, as fossils from the Carboniferous have revealed hagfish-like vertebrates with complex eyes. This would suggest that ancestral Myxini species possessed complex eyes.

=== Cardiac function, circulation, and fluid balance ===
Hagfish are known to have one of the lowest blood pressures among the vertebrates. One of the most primitive types of fluid balance found in animals is among these creatures; when a rise in extracellular fluid occurs, the blood pressure rises and this is sensed by the kidney, which then excretes excess fluid. They also have the highest blood volume to body mass of any chordate, with 17 mL of blood per 100 g of mass.

The hagfish circulatory system has been of considerable interest to evolutionary biologists and present day readers of physiology. Some observers first believed that the hagfish heart was not innervated (as the hearts of jawed vertebrates are), but further investigation revealed that the hagfish does have a true innervated heart. The hagfish circulatory system also includes multiple accessory pumps throughout the body, which are considered auxiliary "hearts".

Hagfish are the only known vertebrates with osmoregulation isosmotic to their external environment. The nature of their blood plasma is more similar to marine invertebrates than vertebrates. Their renal function remains poorly described, while there is a hypothesis that they excrete ions in bile salts.

=== Musculoskeletal system ===
Hagfish musculature differs from jawed vertebrates in that they have neither a horizontal septum nor a vertical septum, which in jawed vertebrates are junctions of connective tissue that separate the hypaxial musculature and epaxial musculature. They do, however, have true myomeres and myosepta like all vertebrates. The mechanics of their craniofacial muscles in feeding have been investigated, revealing advantages and disadvantages of their dental plate. In particular, hagfish muscles have increased force and gape size compared to similar-sized jawed vertebrates, but lack the speed amplification given by jawed vertebrates' muscles, suggesting that jaws are faster acting than hagfish dental plates.

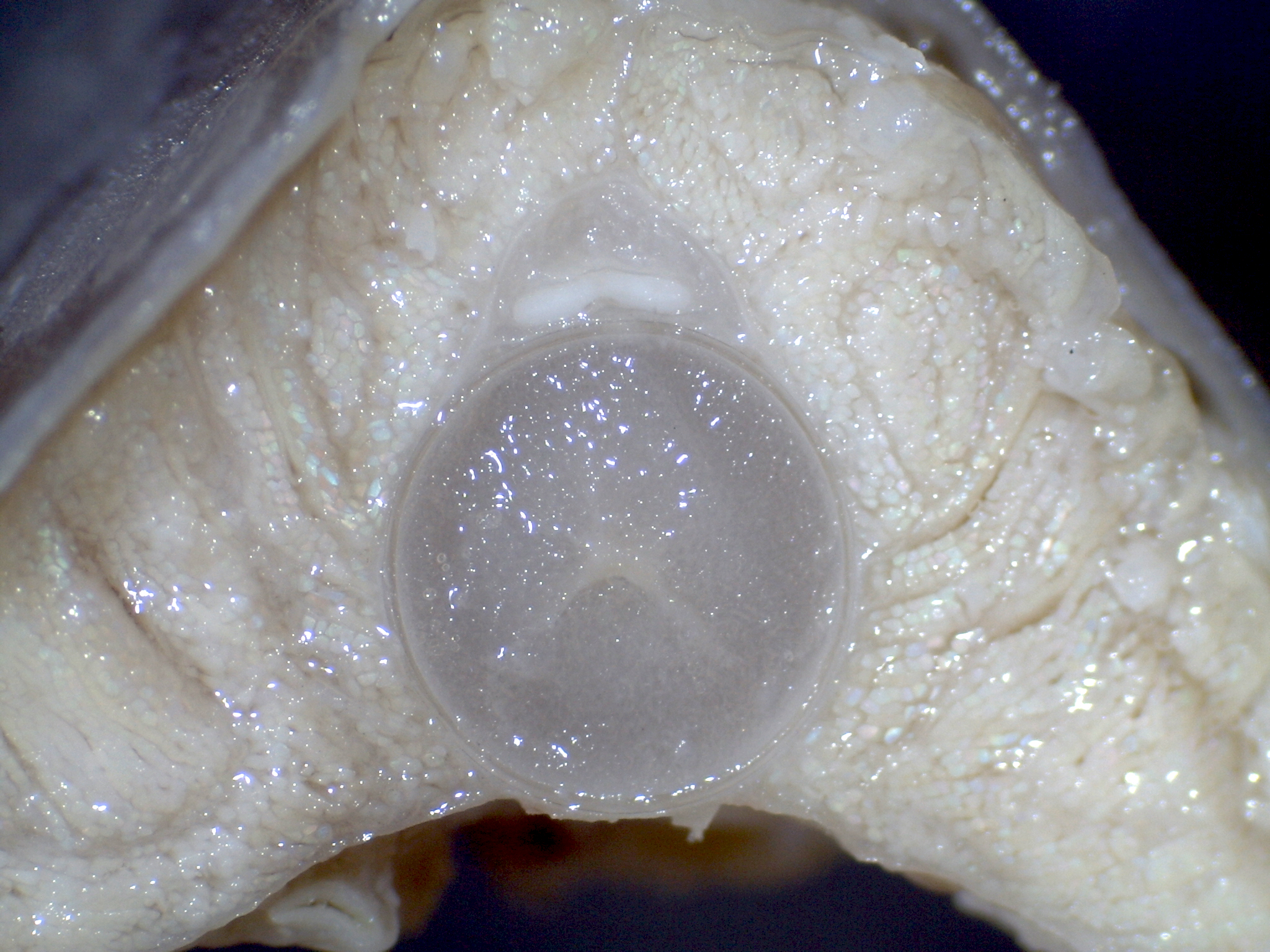
Vertical section of hagfish midline trunk: The notochord is the only skeletal element, and the musculature has no septum, neither horizontal nor vertical.

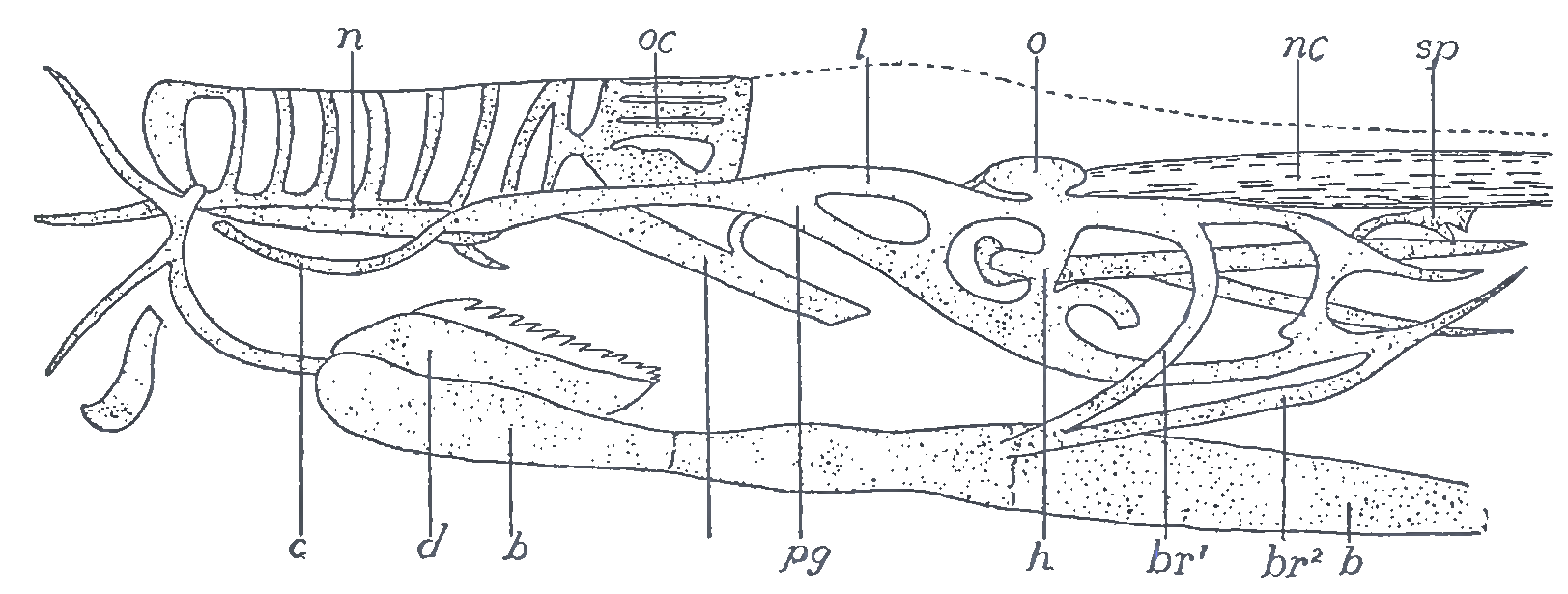
Hagfish skull Fig 74 in Kingsley 1912

The hagfish skeleton comprises the skull, the notochord, and the caudal fin rays. The first diagram of the hagfish endoskeleton was made by Frederick Cole in 1905. In Cole's monograph, he described sections of the skeleton that he termed "pseudo-cartilage", referring to its distinct properties compared to jawed chordates. The lingual apparatus of hagfish is composed of a cartilage base bearing two teeth-covered plates (dental plates) articulated with a series of large cartilage shafts. The nasal capsule is considerably expanded in hagfish, comprising a fibrous sheath lined with cartilage rings. In contrast to lampreys, the braincase is noncartilaginous. The role of their branchial arches is still highly speculative, as hagfish embryos undergo a caudal shift of the posterior pharyngeal pouches; thus, the branchial arches do not support gills. While parts of the hagfish skull are thought to be homologous with lampreys, they are thought to have very few elements homologous with jawed vertebrates.

== Reproduction ==
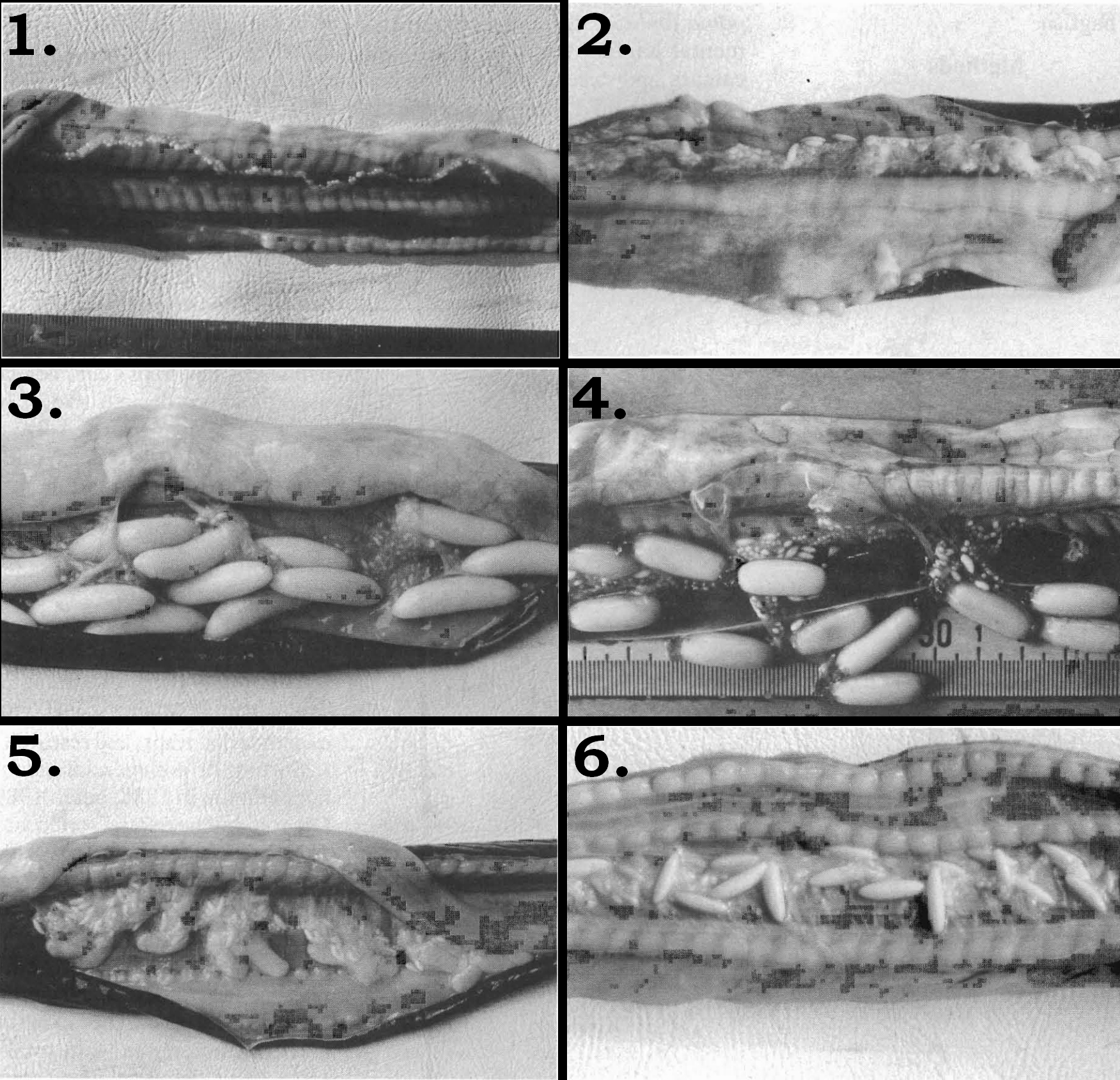
Egg development in a female black hagfish, Eptatretus deani

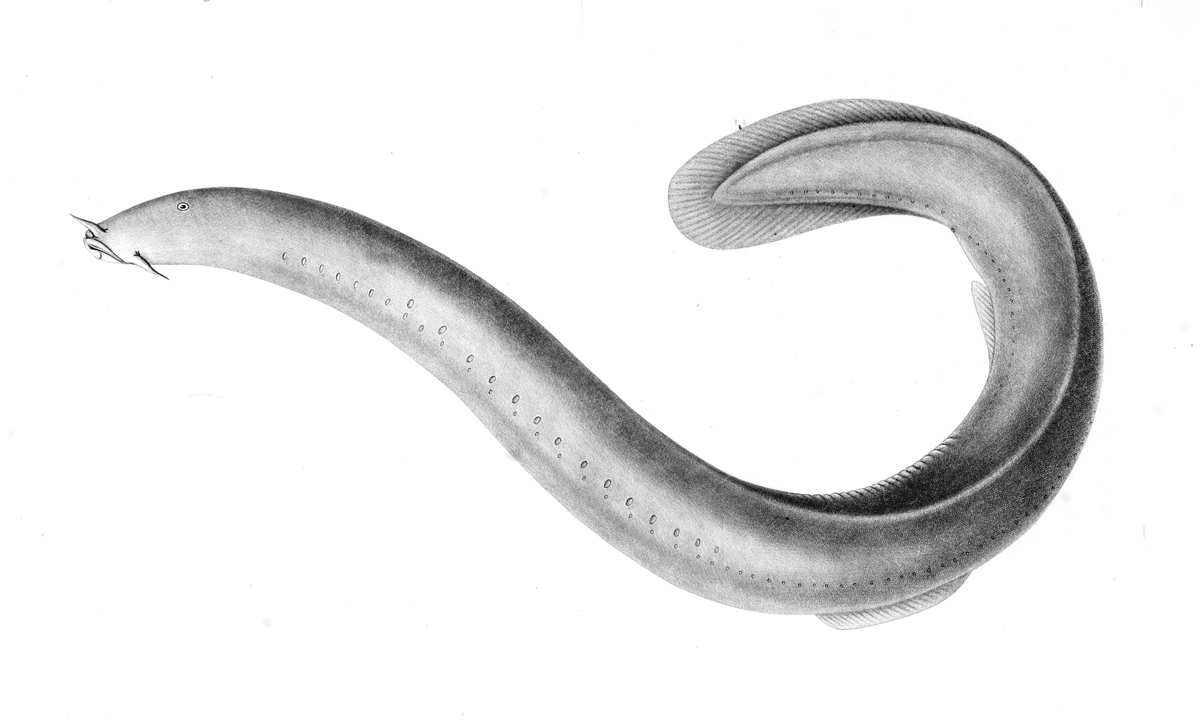
Drawing of Eptatretus polytrema

Very little is known about hagfish reproduction. Obtaining embryos and observing reproductive behavior are difficult due to the deep-sea habitat of many hagfish species. In the wild, females outnumber males, with the exact sex-ratio differing depending on the species. E. burgeri, for example, has nearly a 1:1 ratio, while M. glutinosa females are significantly more common than males. Some species of hagfish are sexually undifferentiated before maturation, and possess gonadal tissue for both ovaries and testes. It has been suggested that females develop earlier than males, and that this may be the reason for unequal sex ratios. Hagfish testes are relatively small.

Depending on species, females lay from one to 30 tough, yolky eggs. These tend to aggregate due to having Velcro-like tufts at either end. It is unclear how hagfish go about laying eggs, although researchers have proposed three hypotheses based on observations of the low percentage of males and small testis. The hypotheses are that female hagfish lay eggs in small crevices in rock formations, the eggs are laid in burrows beneath the sand, and the slime produced by the hagfish is used to hold the eggs in a small area. It is worth noting that no direct evidence has been found to support any of these hypotheses. Hagfish do not have a larval stage, in contrast to lampreys.

Hagfish have a mesonephric kidney and are often neotenic of their pronephric kidney. The kidney(s) are drained via mesonephric/archinephric duct. Unlike many other vertebrates, this duct is separate from the reproductive tract, and the proximal tubule of the nephron is also connected with the coelom, providing lubrication. The single testicle or ovary has no transportation duct. Instead, the gametes are released into the coelom until they find their way to the posterior end of the caudal region, whereby they find an opening in the digestive system.

The hagfish embryo can develop for as long as 11 months before hatching, which is shorter in comparison to other jawless vertebrates. Not much was known about hagfish embryology until recently, when husbandry advances enabled considerable insight into the group's evolutionary development. New insights into the evolution of neural crest cells, support the consensus that all vertebrates share these cells, which might be regulated by a common subset of genes. Their genome has a large number of microchromosomes which are lost during the animal's development, leaving only the reproductive organs with a complete genome. Hagfish possess gonadotropins which secrete from pituitary glands to the gonads to stimulate development. This suggests that hagfish have an early version of the hypothalamic–pituitary–gonadal axis, a system which once thought to be exclusive to the Gnathostomes.

Drawing of a New Zealand hagfish

Some species of hagfish reproduce seasonally, stimulated by hormones from their pituitary gland. E. burgeri is known to reproduce and migrate annually.

== Feeding ==
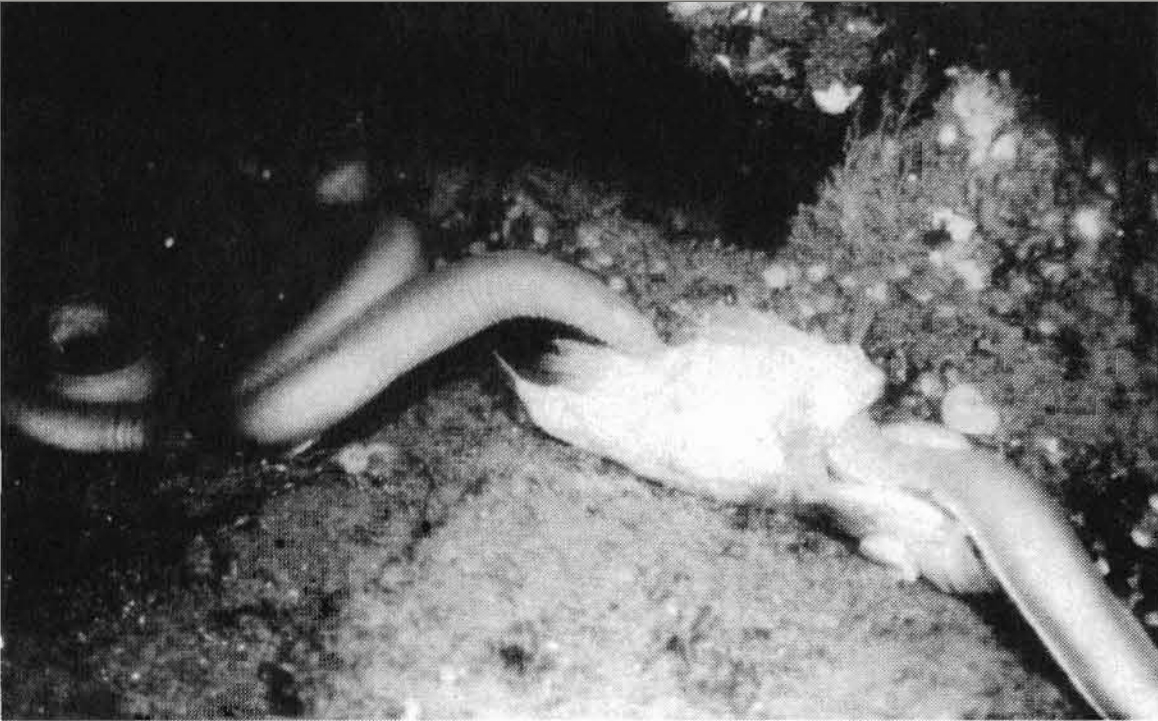
Two Pacific hagfish feeding on a dead sharpchin rockfish, Sebastes zacentrus, while one remains in a curled position at the left of the photo

While polychaete marine worms on or near the sea floor are a major food source, hagfish can feed upon and often even enter and eviscerate the bodies of dead and dying/injured sea creatures much larger than themselves. They are known to devour their prey from the inside. Hagfish have the ability to absorb dissolved organic matter across the skin and gill, which may be an adaptation to a scavenging lifestyle, allowing them to maximize sporadic opportunities for feeding. From an evolutionary perspective, hagfish represent a transitory state between the generalized nutrient absorption pathways of aquatic invertebrates and the more specialized digestive systems of aquatic vertebrates.

Vertebrates rely on extracellular mechanisms to digest their food. Like echinoderms, hagfish lack hydrogen potassium ATPase, an enzyme that acidifies true stomachs. Recent studies have shown that the hagfish gut acts more as a protostomach. This allows the hagfish gut to accomplish functions typically performed by the vertebrate stomach, pancreas, and intestine.

Like leeches, they have a sluggish metabolism and can survive months between feedings; their feeding behavior, however, appears quite vigorous. Analysis of the stomach content of several species has revealed a large variety of prey, including polychaetes, shrimp, hermit crabs, cephalopods, brittle stars, bony fishes, sharks, birds, and whale flesh.

In captivity, hagfish are observed to use the overhand-knot behavior in reverse (tail-to-head) to assist them in gaining mechanical advantage to pull out chunks of flesh from fish or cetacean carrion, eventually making an opening to permit entry to the interior of the body cavity of larger carcasses. A healthy larger sea creature likely would be able to outfight or outswim this sort of assault.

This energetic opportunism on the part of the hagfish can be a great nuisance to fishermen, as they can devour or spoil entire deep drag-netted catches before they can be pulled to the surface. Since hagfish are typically found in large clusters on and near the bottom, a single trawler's catch could contain several dozen or even hundreds of hagfish as bycatch, and all the other struggling, captive sea life make easy prey for them.

The digestive tract of the hagfish is unique among chordates because the food in the gut is enclosed in a permeable membrane, analogous to the peritrophic matrix of insects. They are also able to absorb nutrients directly through their skin.

Hagfish have also been observed actively hunting the red bandfish, Cepola haastii, in its burrow, possibly using their slime to suffocate the fish before grasping it with their dental plates and dragging it from the burrow.

== Classification ==
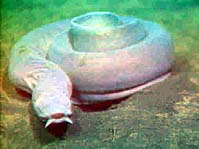
Pacific hagfish resting on the ocean bottom at a depth of 280 m (920 ft) off the Oregon coast

Originally, Myxine was included by Linnaeus (1758) in Vermes. The fossil hagfish Myxinikela siroka, from the late Carboniferous of the United States, is the oldest-known member of the group. It is in some respects more similar to lampreys, but shows key autapomorphies of hagfish. In recent years, hagfish have become of special interest for genetic analysis investigating the relationships among chordates. Their classification as agnathans places hagfish as elementary vertebrates in between invertebrates and gnathostomes. However, discussion has long occurred in scientific literature about whether the hagfish were even invertebrate. Using fossil data, paleontologists posited that lampreys are more closely related to gnathostomes than hagfish. The term "Craniata" was used to refer to animals that had a developed skull, but were not considered true vertebrates. Molecular evidence in the early 1990s first began suggesting that lampreys and hagfish were more closely related to each other than to gnathostomes. The validity of the taxon "Craniata" was further examined by Delarbre et al. (2002) using mtDNA sequence data, concluding the Myxini are more closely related to the Hyperoartia than to the Gnathostomata— i.e., that modern jawless fishes form a clade called the Cyclostomata. The argument is that if the Cyclostomata are indeed monophyletic, Vertebrata would return to its old content (Gnathostomata and Cyclostomata) and the name Craniata, being superfluous, would become a junior synonym. Nowadays, molecular data are almost unanimously in consensus of cyclostome monophyly, with more recent work being directed at shared microRNAs between cyclostomes and gnathostomes. The current classification supported by molecular analyses (which show that lampreys and hagfishes are sister taxa), as well as the fact that hagfishes do, in fact, have rudimentary vertebrae, which places hagfishes in Cyclostomata.

== Phylogeny ==
Hagfish are in the group Cyclostomata which includes jawless fish. The group Cyclostomata is characterized by two significant characteristics; keratinous tooth plates and movement of postotic myomeres to the orbitals. According to fossil record, hagfish and lampreys have been estimated to have diverged from one another during the Paleozoic period. An experiment used an estimation of synonymous and nonsynonymous substitutions for nucleotides and supplemented that data with pre-existing data into a clock that would calculate divergence times for the taxons Myxine and Eptatretus. This data found that the lineage diverged around 93–28 Mya; however, later studies have found even earlier divergence times within the group, with Myxine and Eptatretus diverging during the Triassic and the ancestor of Rubicundus diverging during other extant hagfishes during the Permian. Hagfish are excluded from the subphylum Gnathostomata because of morphological characteristics including the hagfish arched tongue. Hagfish embryos have characteristics of gnathostomes and may be plesiomorphic; however, these characteristics drastically change morphologically as the hagfish matures. The following hagfish and lamprey phylogeny is an adaptation based on the 2019 work of Miyashita et al.

- - †Haikouella
  - - - †Haikouichthys
      - †Myllokunmingia
    - - †Metaspriggina
      - Vertebrata (crown group)
        - Gnathostomata (jawed fish)
        - - †Anaspida
            - †Cornovichthys
            - - - †Achanarella
                - †Ciderius
              - - †Birkeniida
                - - †Lasanius
                  - - †Euphanerops
                    - †Jamoytius
          - - †Pipiscius
            - - †Conodonta (conodonts)
              - Cyclostomi (crown group)
                - - †Myxinikela
                  - Myxinoidea (crown group)
                    - - †Tethymyxine tapirostrum
                      - - Rubicundus eos
                        - Rubicundus lopheliae
                    - - - Myxine glutinosa
                        - Neomyxine biniplicata
                      - - Eptatretus stoutii
                        - - Eptatretus burgeri
                          - "Paramyxine" spp.
                - - †Gilpichthys
                  - - - †Hardistiella
                      - †Mayomyzon
                    - - †Myxineidus
                      - - †Priscomyzon
                        - - †Mesomyzon
                          - Petromyzontiformes (crown group)
                            - - Geotria australis
                              - Mordacia mordax
                            - - Petromyzon marinus
                              - - Lampetra fluviatilis
                                - Lethenteron camtschaticum

== Commercial use ==
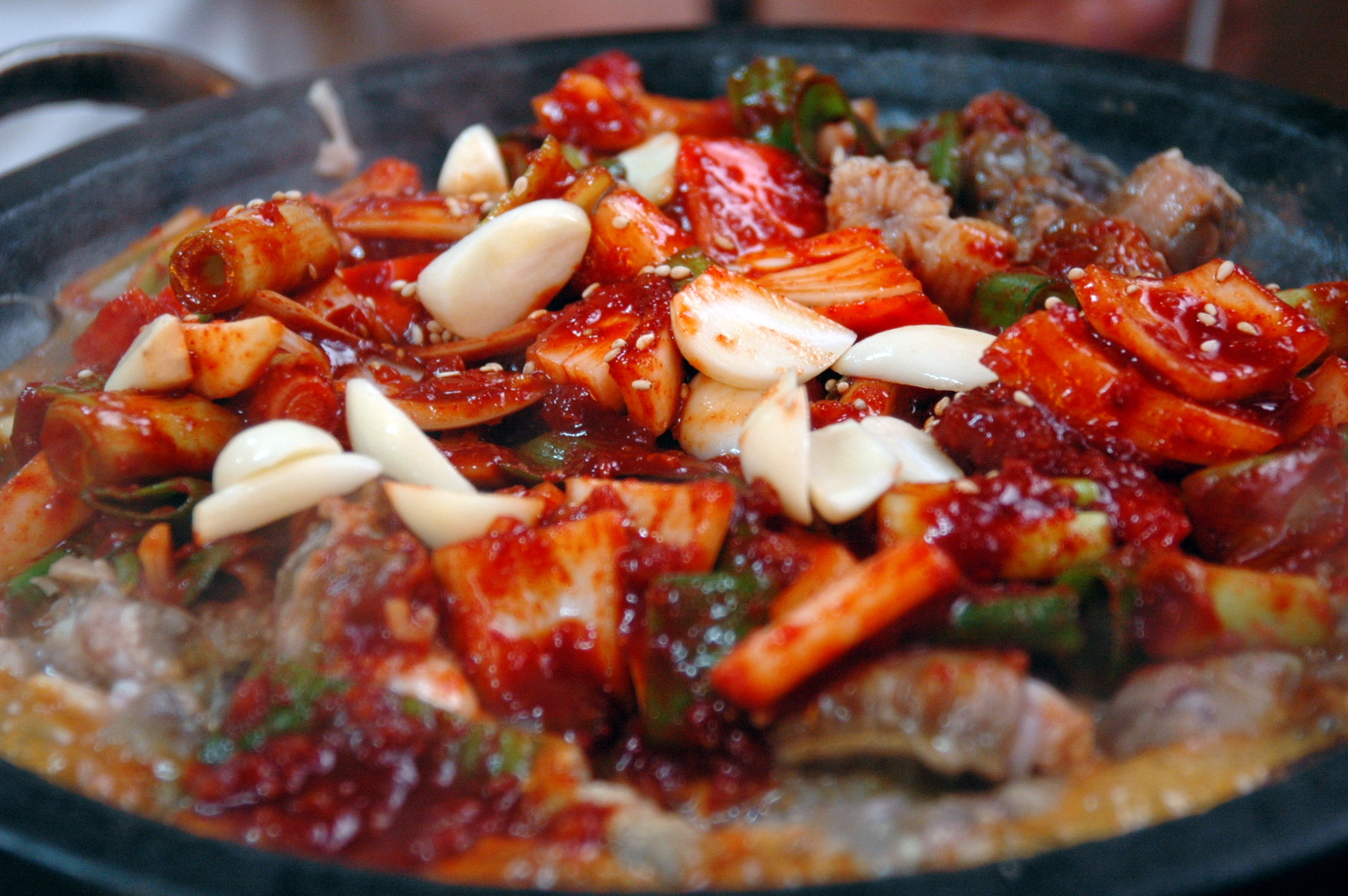
Kkomjangeo bokkeum (꼼장어 볶음), a Korean stir-fried fish dish made with the hagfish Eptatretus burgeri

=== As food ===
In most of the world, hagfish are not often eaten. But in Korea, the hagfish is a valued food, where it is generally skinned, coated in spicy sauce, and grilled over charcoal or stir-fried. It is especially popular in the southern port cities of the peninsula, such as Busan and coastal cities in South Gyeongsang Province.

Due to their value in Korean cuisine, most hagfish caught for food elsewhere in the world is fished with intent of being exported to South Korea. The inshore hagfish, found in the northwest Pacific, is eaten in Japan and South Korea. As hagfish slime binds vast amounts of liquid even at low temperatures, it was proposed as an energy-saving alternative for the production of tofu that does not require heating.

=== In textiles ===
The hagfish slime threads can be used as ultra-strong fiber for clothing. Douglas Fudge, of Chapman University, has conducted research in this area.

=== Skins ===
Hagfish skin, used in a variety of clothing accessories, is usually referred to as "eel skin". It produces a particularly durable leather, especially suitable for wallets and belts.
