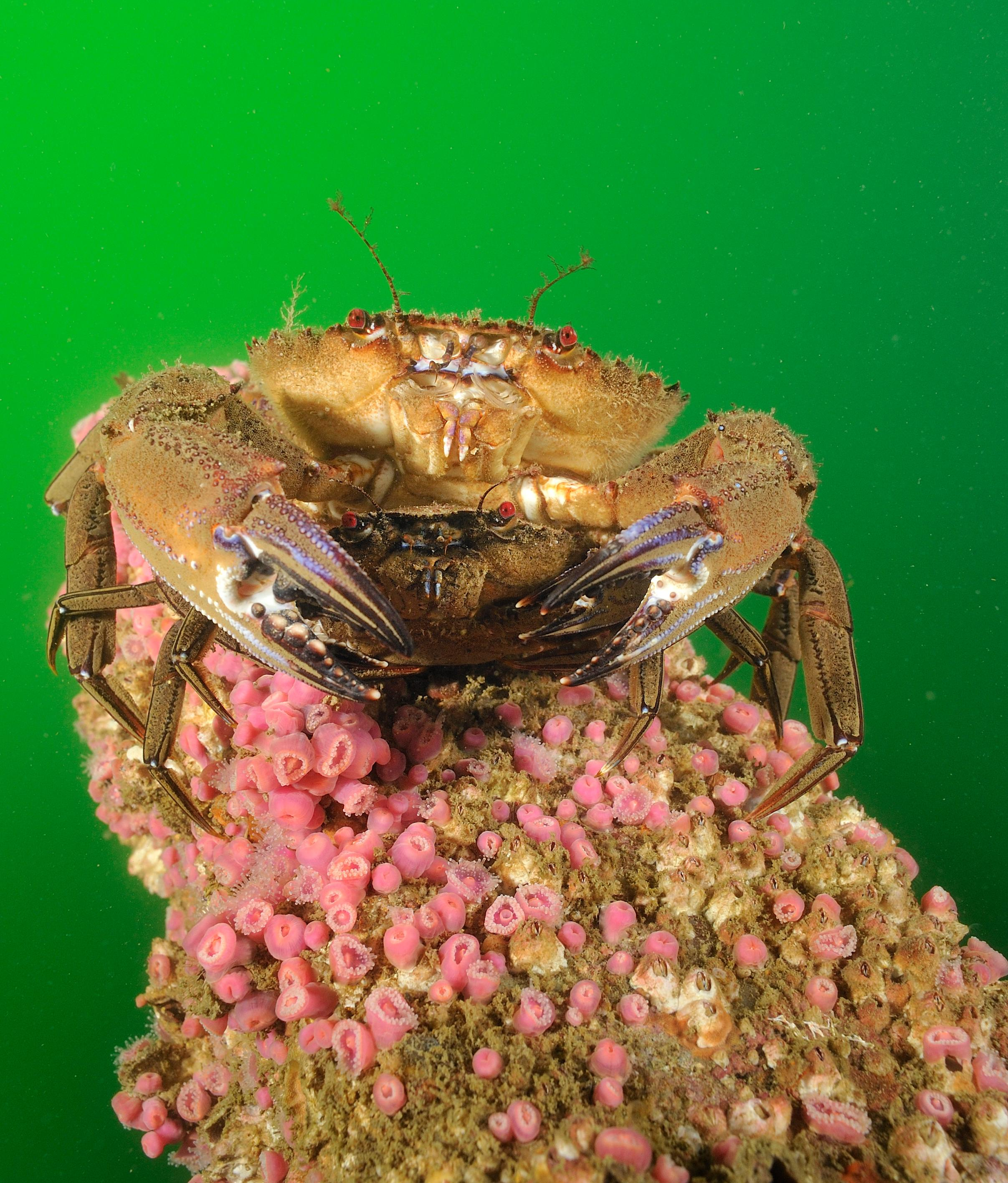
- Velvet crabs among Corynactis anemones in Brest, France

Scientific classification
- Kingdom: Animalia
- Phylum: Arthropoda
- Class: Malacostraca
- Order: Decapoda
- Suborder: Pleocyemata
- Infraorder: Brachyura
- Family: Polybiidae
- Genus: Necora; Holthuis, 1987
- Species: N. puber

Binomial name
- Necora puber (Linnaeus, 1767)

Synonyms
- List: Cancer puber Linnaeus, 1767; Liocarcinus puber (Linnaeus, 1767); Macropipus puber (Linnaeus, 1767); Portunus puber (Linnaeus, 1767); Cancer velutinus Pennant, 1777

= Velvet crab =

Species of crab

The velvet crab (Necora puber), also known as the velvet swimming crab or devil crab, is a species of crab from the North-East Atlantic and the Mediterranean.

== Classification ==
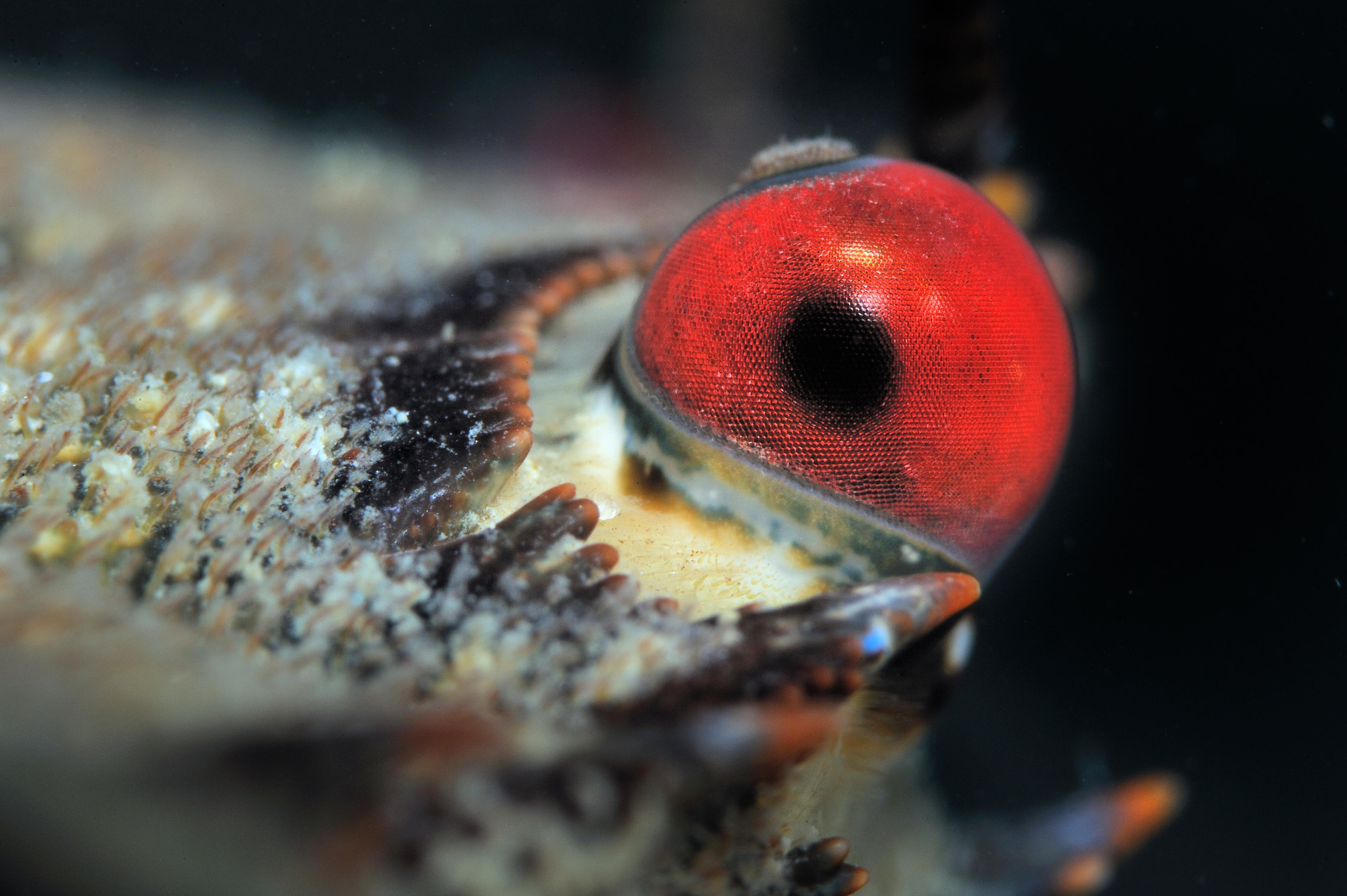
Velvet crabs have distinctive, bright red eyes, for which they are sometimes called "devil crabs"

The velvet crab was first formally described in 1767 by Carl Linnaeus in the second part of the first volume of the twelfth edition of his definitive work Systema Naturae. Linnaeus gave it the name Cancer puber; at the time, all crabs were classified indiscriminately into the genus Cancer. Necora puber is commonly known as the "velvet crab", the "velvet swimming crab", and the "devil crab", the latter due to its aggressive behaviour and bright red eyes. In the Scottish fishing industry, they are sometimes known just as "velvets", and other less pervasive common names include the "velvet fiddler crab" the "lady crab", and the "Kerry witch".

Linnaeus provided a very brief Latin description – "vague and unsatisfactory", according to Lipke Holthuis. In fact, the identity of the crab Linnaeus described is unclear, as no type material was assigned and the description given seems to more closely resemble Polybius corrugatus. Since Linnaeus' initial 1767 description, the velvet crab has been reclassified four times: first into Portunus by Fabricius in 1798, a classification which stood until 1958, when it was transferred to Macropipus by Holthuis and Gottlieb. In 1981 Manning and Holthuis moved it to Liocarcinus, and six years later Holthuis reclassified the species into an entirely new genus, Necora, of which the velvet crab is the only species. This classification still stands. The genus name Necora comes from the local word for the crabs in Galicia. Several species names described by other taxonomists have since been synonymised with N. puber.

=== Phylogenetics ===
Recent phylogenetic studies of the Portunoidea and related groups have considered Necora several times in their research. Necora is usually grouped with members of the genera Bathynectes, Liocarcinus, Macropipus, Polybius, and Thia. (Note: Thia, like Necora, contains only one species.)

A phylogenetic study published in Frontiers in Zoology in 2022 used both maximum parsimony and bayesian inference and analysed morphological characteristics, placing Necora puber in a monophyletic Carcinidae clade. Of the surveyed species, Necora was sister to a Macropipus rugosus / Thia grouping. However, a study using nuclear DNA from 2009 placed Thia sister to a clade that includes Necora, but also species from Macropipus, Liocarcinus, Polybius, and Bathynectes. The authors of the 2009 study noted that the conventional classifications of the Portunoidea and Canceroidea have recently been challenged, and some morphological traits – especially those of the carapace and the chelae – can be affected by convergent evolution. (Note: The 2022 analysis focused on characters of the axial skeleton, the pereiopods, and the crabs' musculature.) The 2016 study kept Necora in the Polybiidae. A yet earlier (2001) study using mitochondrial DNA of 46 species paired Necora with Bathynectes maravigna, close to Macropipus tuberculatus and Thia.

- - Liocarcinus and Polybius spp.
  - - Bathynectes maravigna
    - - Necora puber
      - - Macropipus rugosus
        - Thia scutellata

After Hazerli et al, 2022.

- - Thia scutellata
  - - Necora puber
    - Bathynectes maravigna
    - Macropipus tuberculatus
    - Liocarcinus and Polybius spp.

After Schubert & Reuschel, 2009.

== Distribution ==
In the British Isles, velvet crabs are found from Orkney around Scotland, England, Wales, and Ireland. They also live in the nearby German Bight and in parts of the West Frisian Islands.

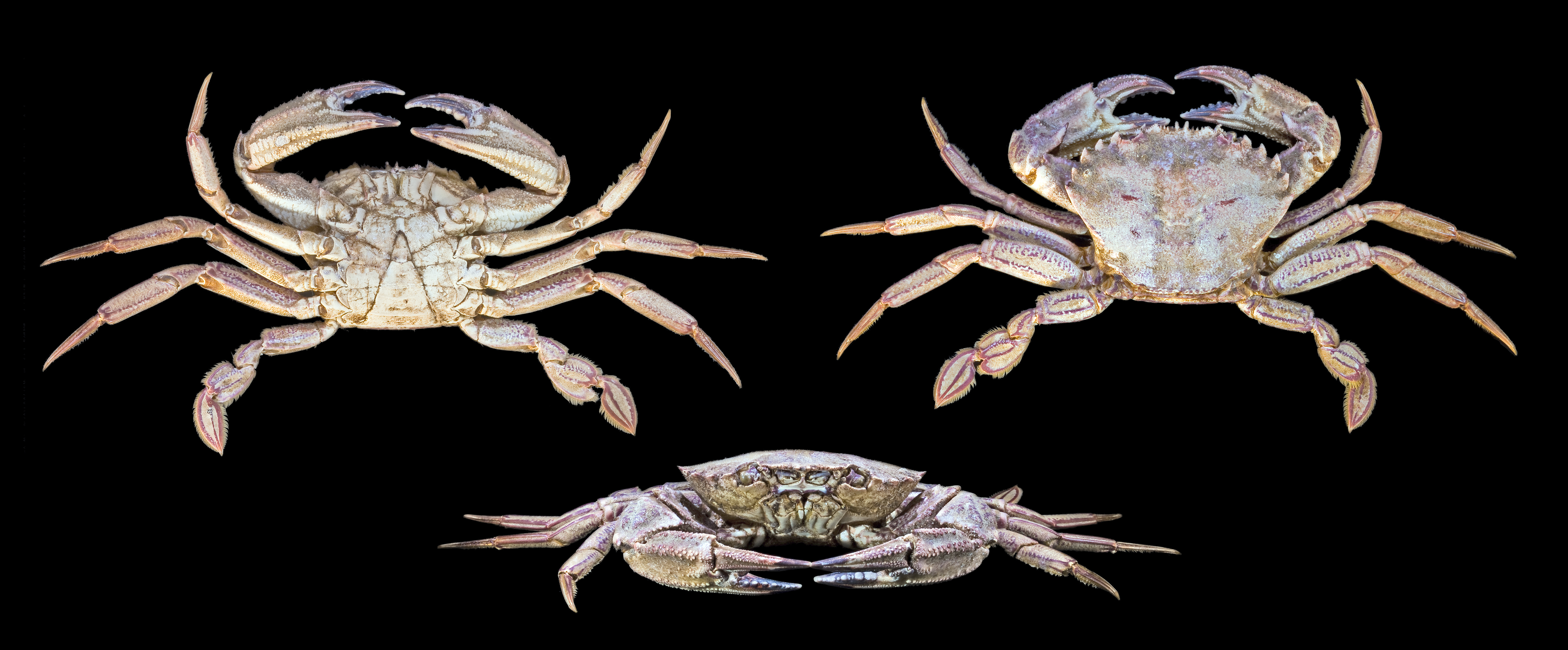
Bottom, top, and front views of one dried velvet crab specimen

== Description ==
Velvet crabs have a dark, flattened carapace which ranges from black to brown in colour and is usually around 6.5 cm long and up to 10 cm across, weighing up to 250 grams. The carapace is pubescent with short yellowish hairs providing a velvety texture. Tubercles are scattered across the upper surface, with a higher concentration towards the front. The frontal part of the crab's underside has some tubercles as well and is densely hairy. The front of the carapace is mostly straight and bends slightly inwards at the centre line; the front edge bears seven to ten tooth-like indentations. The claw-bearing legs (the chelipeds) also have short hairs and are of equally short length. The "wrist" is armed with a spine on its outer side.

== Conservation ==
Velvet crabs are "very common".

=== French fisheries ===
In France, velvet crabs are considered a delicacy. Fisheries in south Brittany, France's main producers of velvet crabs, suffered in the late 20th century due to mass mortality events; between 1984 and 1988 the catch dropped by 96%. The decline was attributed to infections by dinoflagellates which a 1996 investigation tentatively identified as belonging to the genus Hematodinium.

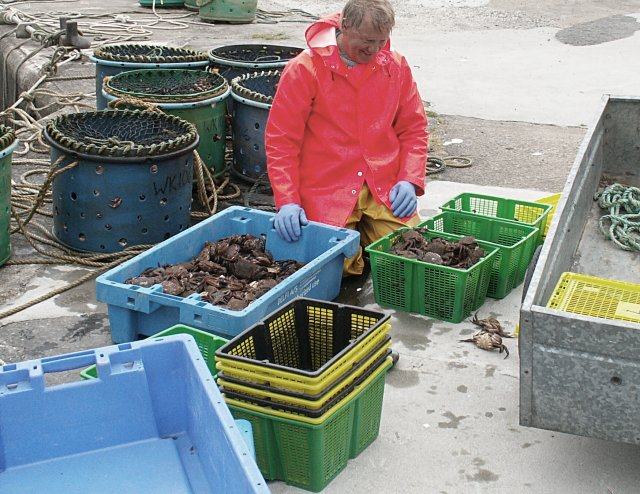
A fisherman in Lybster, Scotland, sorts velvet crabs for export. Scotland is today Europe's largest velvet crab fisher.

=== British fisheries ===
Velvet crabs are traditionally eaten in France and Spain, and are commercially important for the British Isles, although they were there once regarded as pests. In the United Kingdom, the velvet crab catch is regulated by The Undersized Velvet Crabs Order 1989, which enforced a minimum landing size of 6.5 cm across the carapace, although it is also customary to throw back egg-bearing females when caught.

Targeted fishing for the crabs is a recent phenomenon in Ireland, having started in the 1980s in response to increased demand due to the collapse of the Spanish velvet crab fisheries and thus of the southern European stocks. Velvet crabs are found all around Ireland, where the crabs are often taken as bycatch from edible crab and lobster fisheries, but they are fished for in the Irish Sea. Between 2006 and 2014, the volume of velvet crabs caught in Ireland decreased by nearly 100 tonnes, down from 230 tonnes, prompting concerns from fishermen and the fishing industry. In 2003, the velvet crab catch in Ireland was worth £5,812 a year.

Velvet crab fisheries in Scotland have a similar history: the crabs were once regarded as pests, but the 1980s supply crisis prompted the emergence of a Scottish fishery. Today, Scotland is in fact Europe's largest fisher of velvet crabs, although the crabs are rarely targeted specifically and are caught alongside edible crabs and lobster. In 2011, the Scottish velvet crab fishery caught £5.8 million worth of crabs, or more than two thousand tonnes. The most productive areas are around the Scottish islands and west coast, the fishery having started around the Hebrides and Orkney islands, but an east coast industry is also emerging. Although the industry is regulated, the crabs may be being overfished in the Firth of Clyde, Orkney and South Minch.

In England, the velvet crab fishery reached its peak in 2006, and in 2011 around 200 tonnes of crabs worth £290,000 were landed. Velvet crabs are also found around the Isle of Man, but it is not of primary interest to the fishing industry there.

== Bibliography ==
- Adema, J.P.H.M., 1991. "De Krabben van Nederland en Belgie" (in Dutch), published by the Nationaal Natuurhistorisch Museum. ISBN 90-73239-02-8
- Barreto, Elisa and Bailey, Nick, 2013. "Fish and Shellfish Stocks, 2013 Edition", published by the Scottish Government. ISBN 978-1-78256-861-2; ISSN 2044-0340
- Collins, Evelyn et al., 2022. "High prevalence of Paramarteilia canceri infecting velvet swimming crabs Necora puber in Ireland", published in Diseases of Aquatic Organisms volume 148. doi:10.3354/dao03652 CC-BY 4.0
- Cuvier, Georges and Latreille, Pierre André, 1834. The Animal Kingdom, vol. 3. doi:10.5962/bhl.title.39976 OCLC 7349472
- Hazerli, Dennis; Höpel, Christoph Gert; and Richter, Stefan, 2022. "New insights into the evolution of portunoid swimming crabs (Portunoidea, Heterotremata, Brachyura) and the brachyuran axial skeleton", published in Frontiers in Zoology volume 19, no. 1 by BMC. doi:10.1186/s12983-022-00467-8. CC-BY-SA 4.0
- Hearn, Alex R., 2004. "Reproductive biology of the velvet swimming crab, Necora puber (Brachyura: Portunidae), in the Orkney Islands, UK" published in Sarsia volume 89.
- Hinchliff, Laura; Dick, Jaimie; Sigwart, Julia; and Gilmore, Lynn, 2015. The velvet swimming crab (Necora puber) fishery in Northern Ireland: a study of populations and welfare to enhance sustainability, published by Queen’s University Belfast and Seafish. ISBN 978-1-906634-94-0
- Holthuis, Lipke B., 1987. "Necora, a new genus of European swimming crabs (Crustacea, Decapoda, Portunidae) and its type species, Cancer puber L., 1767", published in Zoologische Mededelingen volume 61 no. 1 by the National Museum of Natural History, Leiden. ISSN 0024-0672
- Ingle, Raymond W., 1980. British Crabs, published by Oxford University Press. IA britishcrabs0000ingl
- Linnaeus, Carl, 1767. Systema Naturae, 12th edition, vol. 1 part 2. doi:10.5962/bhl.title.37256
- Schubart, Christoph D. and Reuschel, Silke, 2009. "A proposal for a new classification of Portunoidea and Cancroidea (Brachyura: Heterotremata) based on two independent molecular phylogenies" in Decapod Crustacean Phylogenetics, 1st edition, published by CRC Press. ISBN 9780429145384
- Trewhella, Steve; and Hatcher, Julie, 2021. The Essential Guide to Beachcombing and the Strandline, published by Princeton University Press. ISBN 9780691232423
