= Enteroctopus magnificus =

Southern giant octopus

Conservation status
- Least Concern (IUCN 3.1)

Scientific classification
- Kingdom: Animalia
- Phylum: Mollusca
- Class: Cephalopoda
- Order: Octopoda
- Family: Enteroctopodidae
- Genus: Enteroctopus
- Species: E. magnificus

Binomial name
- Enteroctopus magnificus (Villanueva, Sanchez & Compagno, 1992)
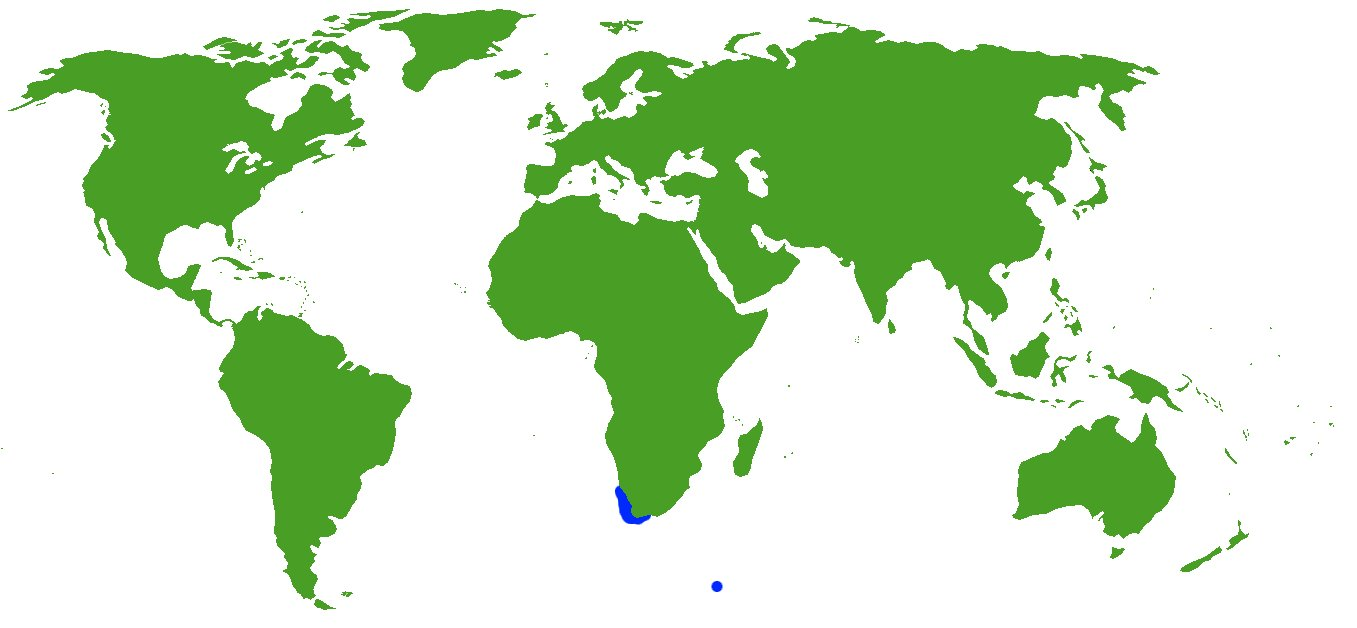
- range of E. magnificus

Synonyms
- Octopus magnificus Villanueva, Sanchez & Compagno, 1992

Species of mollusc

Enteroctopus magnificus, also known as the southern giant octopus, is a large octopus in the genus Enteroctopus. It is native to the waters off Namibia and South Africa.

== Description ==
E. magnificus bears the distinctive characteristics of the genus Enteroctopus, including longitudinal folds on the body and large, paddle-like papillae. E. magnificus is a large octopus, reaching total lengths of up to 1.8 metres (5 ft 11 in) and a mass of 11.4 kilograms (25 lb).

== Range and habitat ==
E. magnificus occurs from Namibia to Port Elizabeth, South Africa. It is found primarily on sand and mud flats from shallow subtidal areas to about 1,000 metres (3,300 ft) depth.

== Predators ==
E. magnificus is predated on by the South African fur seal (Arctocephalus pusillus pusillus) and the leafscale gulper shark (Centrophorus squamosus).

== Diet ==
Like many octopuses, E. magnificus is a generalist predator. The chief food source for this octopus is the deep-sea portunid crab Bathynectes piperitus. Other major prey items include the Cape hagfish (Myxine capensis), the crab species Pontophilus gracilis, and hermit crabs in the genus Parapagurus.

== Fisheries ==
E. magnificus is only collected by trawl and in lobster pots. Harvest of this octopus is small, mainly as a finfish trawl fisheries by-catch.
