= Sasakiopus =

Conservation status
- Least Concern (IUCN 3.1)

Scientific classification
- Kingdom: Animalia
- Phylum: Mollusca
- Class: Cephalopoda
- Order: Octopoda
- Family: Enteroctopodidae
- Genus: Sasakiopus; Jorgensen, Strugnell & Allcock, 2010
- Species: S. salebrosus

Binomial name
- Sasakiopus salebrosus (Sasaki, 1920)

Synonyms
- Octopus salebrosus Sasaki, 1920; Bathypolypus salebrosus (Sasaki, 1920)

Genus of molluscs

Sasakiopus is a genus of octopus containing only one species, Sasakiopus salebrosus, the rough octopus. It is part of the family Enteroctopodidae. Genetic analysis appeared to show that S. salebrosus is the sister taxon of the genera Benthoctopus and Vulcanoctopus, although the former is now considered a synonym of Bathypolypus, the only genus in the family Bathypolypodidae, and the latter as a synonym of Muusoctopus.

The type specimen was collected and the Sea of Okhotsk, and the describer Madoka Sasaki named it Octopus salebrosus in 1920. When Guy Coburn Robson revised the Octopodidae, he tentatively reassigned O. salebrosus to Bathypolypus based on its rough skin, deep web, and short arms. The only specimens available to Robson were females, so the ligula could not be examined, the ligulae of Bathypolypus are distinctively large and are laminated. Subsequent workers raised doubts about where this species should be placed until surveys of demersal fish in the eastern Bering Sea gave workers the opportunity to study many specimens of B. salebrosus. The result was that it was placed in the new genus Sasakiopus.

Sasakiopus salebrosus is a benthic octopus with two rows of suckers on each arm, with the arms being roughly two times the length of the mantle in adults. They do not show arm autotomy and no enlarged suckers are seen. The integument has a sculpture of extensive papillae which are flat-topped, closely set, and irregular. No white spots occur on the dorsum and no oceallae or enlarged or supraocular papillae are present. The third right arm is hectocotylised in the males, and these have a large ligula which is not laminated. In life, Needham's sac extends into the dextral side of the mantle.
