= Myxine limosa =

Scientific classification
- Kingdom: Animalia
- Phylum: Chordata
- Infraphylum: Agnatha
- Class: Myxini
- Order: Myxiniformes
- Family: Myxinidae
- Genus: Myxine
- Species: M. limosa

Binomial name
- Myxine limosa Girard, 1859

Species of Jawless fish

Myxine limosa, also called Girard's Atlantic hagfish, is a jawless fish in the genus Myxine.

== Description ==
This eel-like species grows up to 79 centimetres (31 in) long. Its color in life ranges from reddish brown to dark purple, and there are no visible eyes. The mouth is surrounded by 6 barbels, and there are 5 or 6 gill pouches on either side of the head, with one exterior connection.

=== Similar species ===
M. limosa is perhaps most similar to Myxine glutinosa, which is grayish pink and grows up to 43 cm (17 in) long. North American Eptatretus hagfishes are also similar but have 5–14 gill pouches, which open independently to the exterior. Petromyzon marinus has 7 pairs of gill pouches, one top nostril, and small visible eyes.

== Taxonomy ==
The species was described by Charles Frédéric Girard, a French zoologist, in 1859.

== Distribution and habitat ==
It occurs in the Western Atlantic Ocean, from Baffin Island, Canada, south to North Carolina, at depths of 30–960 metres (98–3,150 ft), sometimes venturing into 30-m-shallow water.
