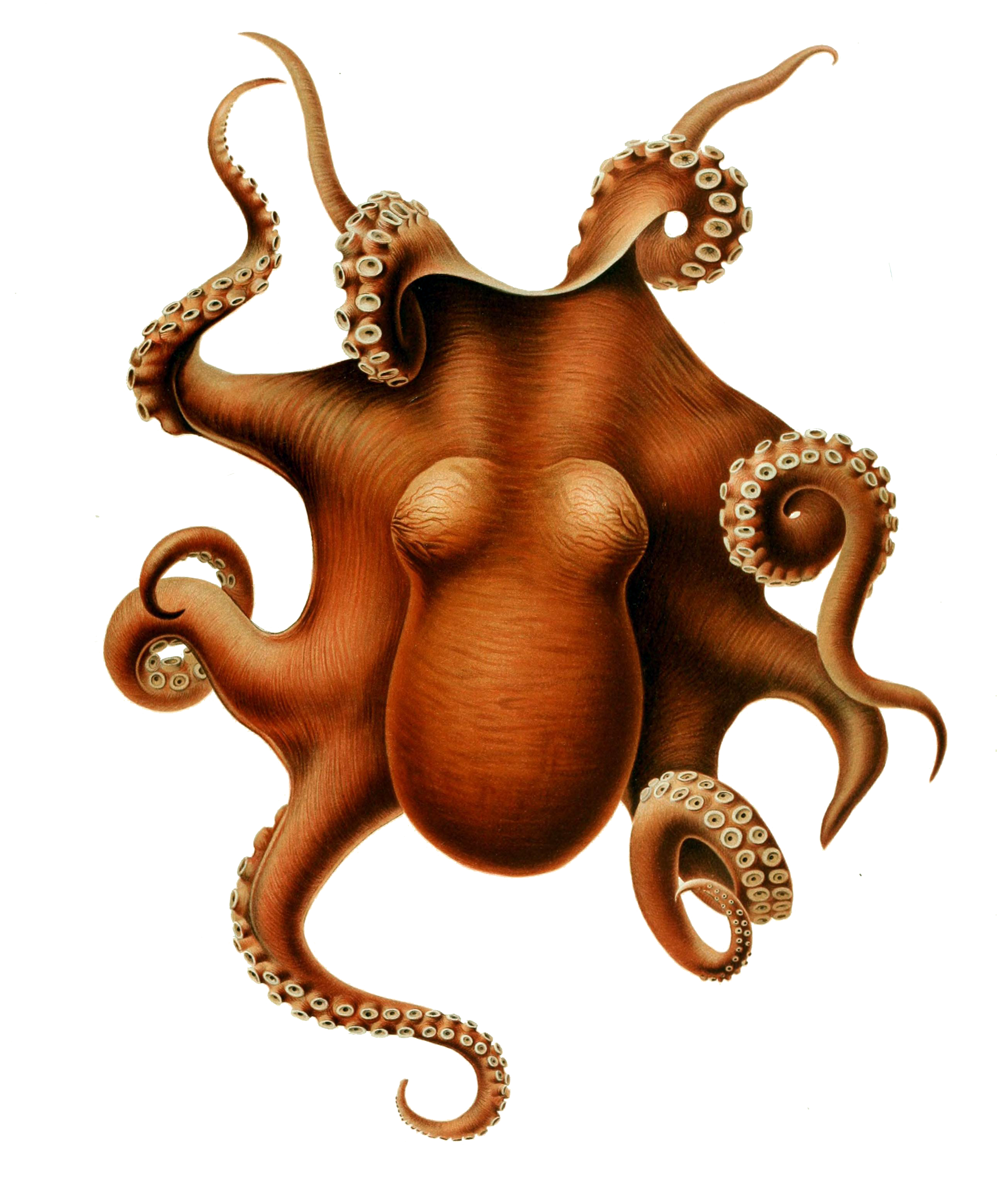

Conservation status
- Least Concern (IUCN 3.1)

Scientific classification
- Kingdom: Animalia
- Phylum: Mollusca
- Class: Cephalopoda
- Order: Octopoda
- Family: Enteroctopodidae
- Genus: Muusoctopus
- Species: M. levis

Binomial name
- Muusoctopus levis (Hoyle, 1885)

Synonyms
- Benthoctopus levis (Hoyle, 1885); Octopus levis Hoyle, 1885; Polypus levis (Hoyle, 1885)

= Muusoctopus levis =

Species of octopus

Muusoctopus levis is a species of octopus in the family Enteroctopodidae. It was first described by William Evans Hoyle in 1885 in an article in the Annals and Magazine of Natural History detailing the new species of octopus found on HMS Challenger as part of the Challenger expedition; the type specimen was retrieved from the Southern Ocean. The species is found in subantarctic waters in the Southern Ocean, particularly surrounding Heard Island and Kerguelen Island, but specimens comparable to M. levis have also been found at the Antarctic Peninsula.

== Description ==
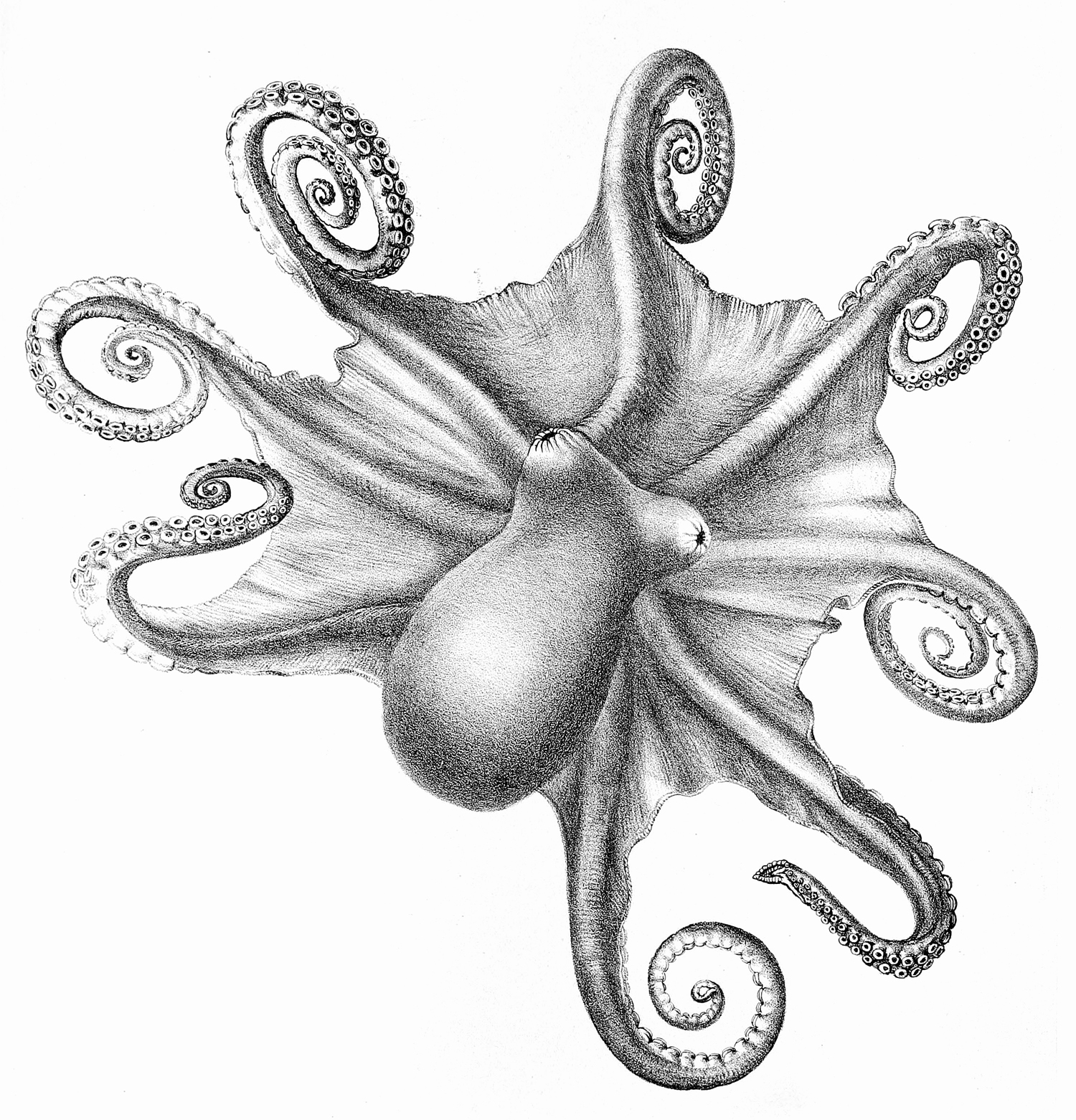
Muusoctopus levis

It is known to inhabit shallow depths between 21 and 404 m (69 and 1,325 ft). It is predatory, living and feeding in the benthic zone, where it feeds heavily on brittle stars. In a study in which the stomach contents of 70 specimens were examined, around 50 were shown to have fed only on brittle stars. A study on the reproductive strategies of coleoid cephalopods concluded, while "a simultaneous terminal spawning strategy is most likely" for M. levis, "the egg-length frequency graphs and multivariate analysis also suggest a greater variation in egg-lengths which could lead to spawning over an extended period". The study collected five female M. levis specimens from the Southern Ocean. They weighed from 16 to 219 g (0.56 to 7.72 oz) and the mantle length was from 34 to 58 mm (1.3 to 2.3 in).

M. levis is similar in appearance to another species in the same genus, Muusoctopus rigbyae, which was first described in 2009 based on specimens found in Antarctic trawling surveys near the Antarctic Peninsula, and while similar in appearance, differs from M. levis in its arm length, the depth of its interdigital webbing, and specific details of its hectocotylus. Further, the species is found in slightly deeper waters, having been recorded at depths between 250 and 600 m (820 and 1,970 ft).
