= Myxine circifrons =

Conservation status
- Least Concern (IUCN 3.1)

Scientific classification
- Kingdom: Animalia
- Phylum: Chordata
- Infraphylum: Agnatha
- Class: Myxini
- Order: Myxiniformes
- Family: Myxinidae
- Genus: Myxine
- Species: M. circifrons

Binomial name
- Myxine circifrons Garman, 1899
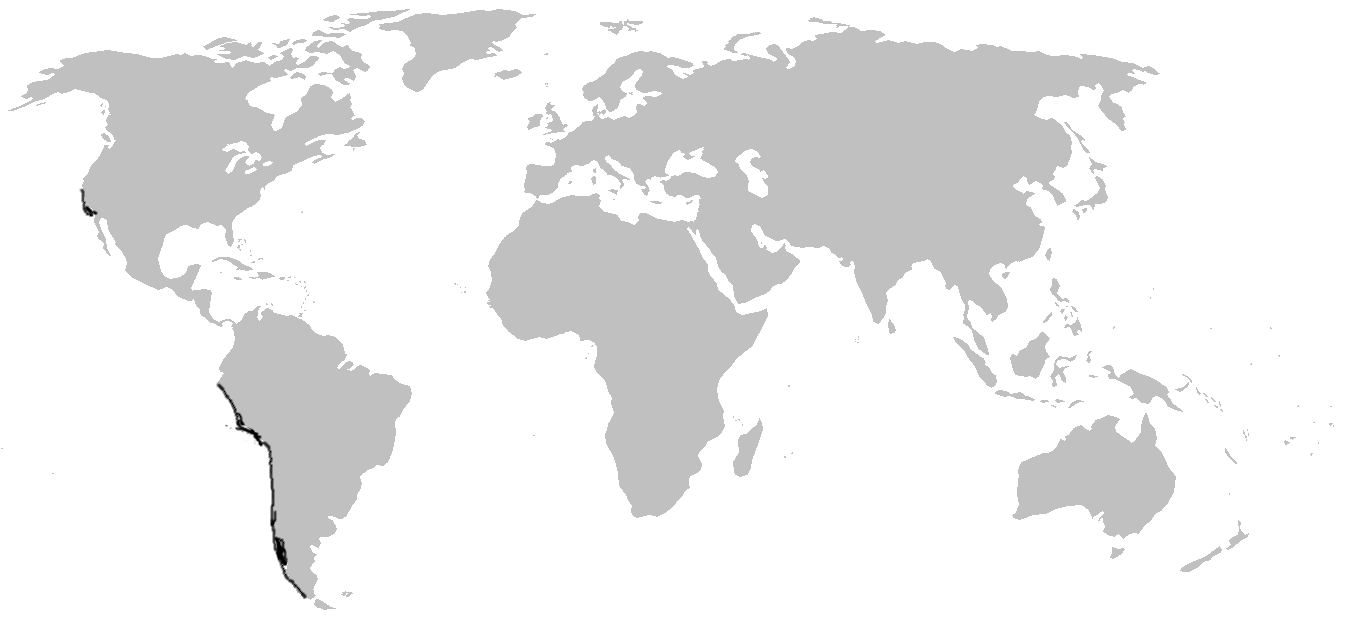

Species of fish

The whiteface hagfish (Myxine circifrons) is a hagfish species of the Myxinidae family. Its species name is likely derived from the Latin words circularis (“round”) and frons (“face” or “brow”). Its common name likely refers to its head and barbels, which is more lightly colored than the rest of its body.

== Taxonomy ==
The species Myxine circifrons belongs to the Cyclostomi superclass and the Myxini class. Within the Myxini class, this species is nested within the Myxiniforme order and Myxinidae family. Myxine circifrons belongs to the Myxininae subfamily, a sister to the Eptatretinae and to the Rubicundinae However, there is ongoing debate on the distinction between genuses within the Myxinidae family, and future research may result in taxonomic changes

== Description ==
The whiteface hagfish is an eel-like fish that grows to about 47–65 cm (about 18.6-25.6 in) in length. The whiteface hagfish, like all hagfish, are primitive jawless fishes that possess a notochord, a cartilaginous skeleton, slime pores, gill pouches, vestigial eyes, and no scales. Instead of a jaw, hagfish have dental plates with tooth-like structures lining its mouth that are used to latch onto food. Hagfish are blind, so whiteface hagfish possess nasal, narial and buccal barbels that allow them to feel their surroundings. Gonads are situated in the peritoneal cavity. A defining characteristic of the Myxininae (and by extension the Myxine) is the presence of one pair of common gill apertures and lighter coloration on the head compared to the rest of the body. Differentiating species within the Myxine genus may be difficult, because individual species look very similar to each other. The whiteface hagfish may be distinguished from other Myxines through counting 13 teeth in the upper series of its dental plates and 5 gill pouches. This species also has 80-102 slime pores, a well developed ventral fin fold, a rounded caudal fin fold, and a larger gill aperture on the left side of the body.

Hagfish are blind and must rely on other means to sense their surroundings, such as their olfactory senses. They channel water through a singular nasal duct which channels water through an olfactory organ. Whiteface hagfish have a narrow, well-developed valve connected to their olfactory organs, which channels water through their bodies without the assistance of other structures. This differentiates them from some Eptatretus species, which rely on more structures for the same task. Channeling water through their olfactory organs allows them to sense their surroundings via smell.

== Distribution and habitat ==
Whiteface hagfish distribution spans along the eastern edge of the Pacific Ocean basin from California to Chile. This species is found at depths of 700–1860 meters off continental slopes living in burrows on the soft benthic substrate. Whiteface hagfish do not generally migrate; Hagfish species have been observed to be endemic to localized regions their entire lives. Because of their localized distributions, much species differentiation occurs through geologic processes such as plate spreading. However, whiteface hagfish have been observed to travel from Chile to around Peru and Ecuador.

== Reproduction ==
The whiteface hagfish becomes male when the posterior part of the gonads develop and female if the anterior part develops. If both develop, the fish becomes hermaphroditic, and if none develops, the fish becomes sterile.

Hagfish reproduction is poorly understood; what is known is limited to species Myxine glutinosa, Eptatretus stoutii, and Eptatretus burgeri, which leaves information about whiteface hagfish reproduction unclear. Among these three species, hermaphroditism has been observed. Whiteface hagfish juveniles are of undifferentiated sex. Sex is determined depending on the part of the gonad that develops. The whiteface hagfish becomes male when the posterior part of the gonads develop and female if the anterior part develops. If both develop, the fish becomes hemaphroditic, and if none develops, the fish becomes sterile. However, hermaphrodism was not observed in presumably adult whiteface hagfish, suggesting that this trait is not shared by all hagfish species. Due to hagfishes being poorly studied as a whole, the full lifespan of any hagfish species is unknown.

== Diet and feeding behavior ==
Feeding behavior specific to whiteface hagfish is poorly understood, but it could be inferred that they feed similarly to other hagfish species. Hagfish are opportunistic scavengers. They primarily feed on detritus that falls from the surface, but also likely rely on larger, more nutrient-dense vertebrate and invertebrate remains. Food is scarce in their benthic and demersal habitats, so hagfish swarm to feed when large amounts of food are present.

== Predation ==
Hagfish are not commonly preyed upon because of their unusual ability to produce copious amounts of slime. Hagfish, whiteface hagfish included, excrete threads of mucins into the water, which produces an unusually thick layer of slime around its body. The unique structure of the slime produced behaves more like fibers because of its viscosity, which strongly deters predators from feeding on them.

== Conservation status ==
As of 2011, whiteface hagfish have been listed as least concern. Hagfish have been utilized as a food source in East Asia for decades, leaving an impact on hagfish fisheries in Asia. Since this species is endemic to the Americas, direct consumption of whiteface hagfish is uncommon. However, there is a growing market for hagfish in North America for hagfish skin, which is used as leather. This may impact east Pacific hagfish species (such as whiteface hagfish) whose previously unaffected populations could be impacted by novel human interaction.
