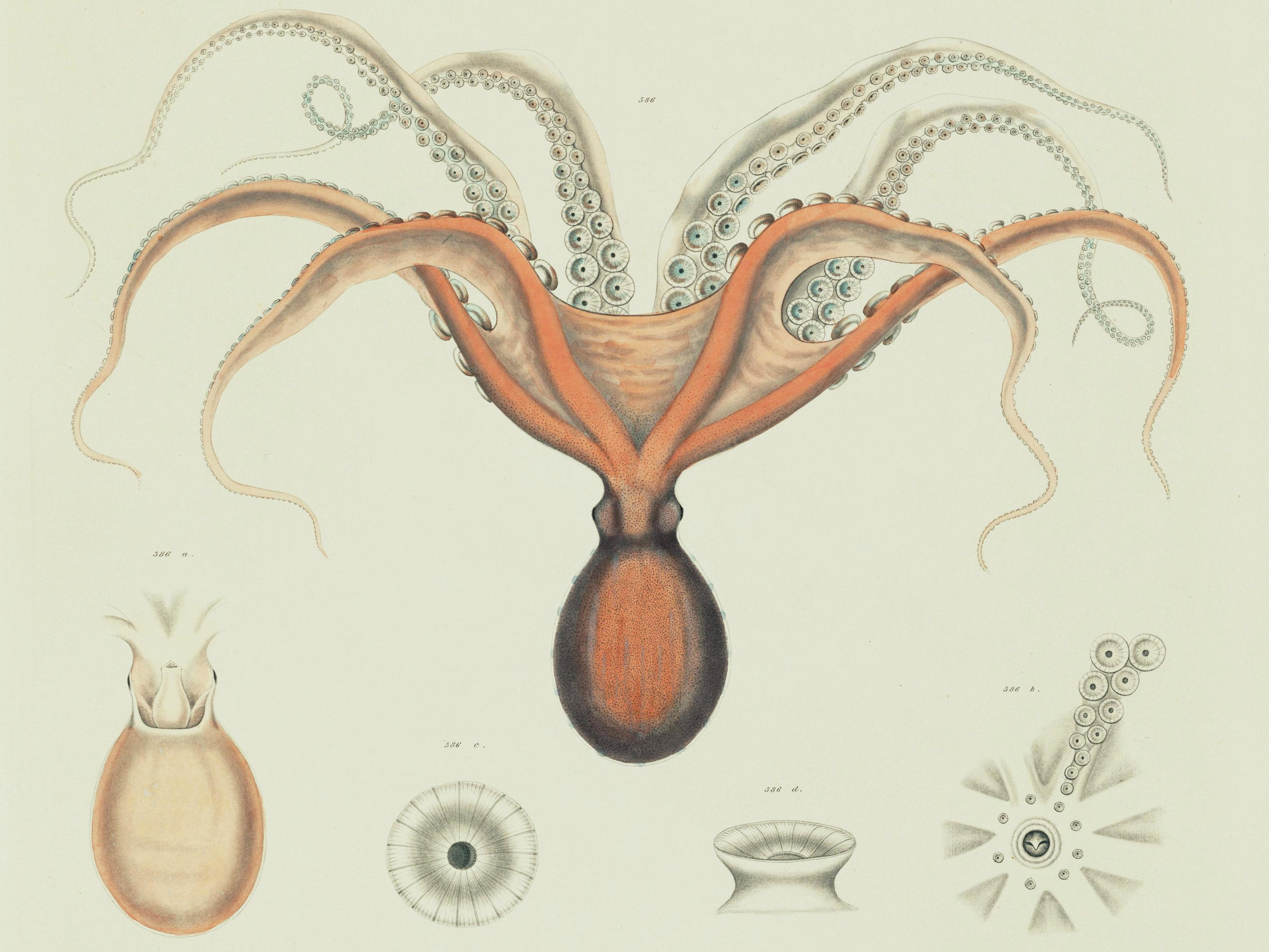

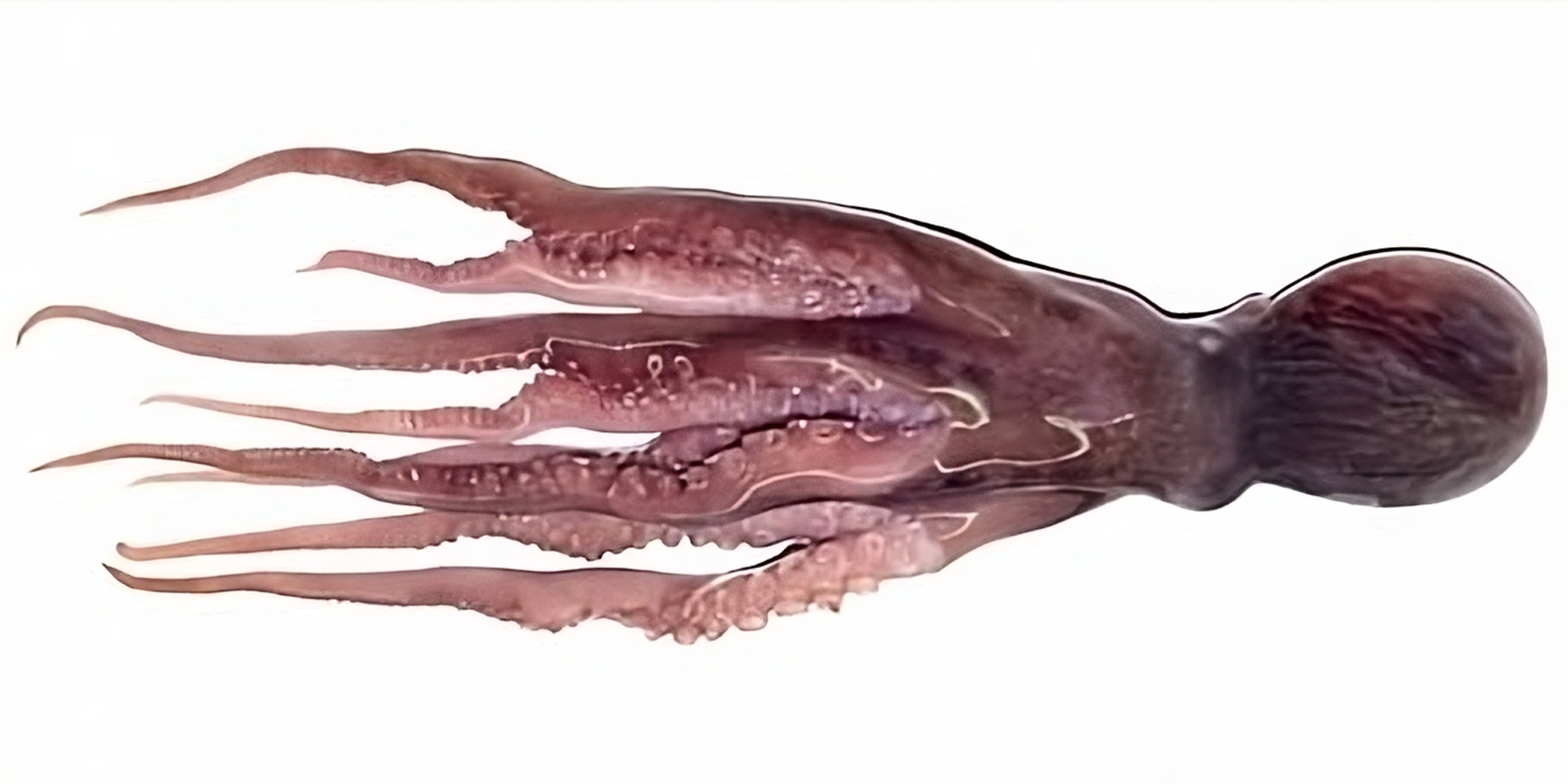

Conservation status
- Least Concern (IUCN 3.1)

Scientific classification
- Kingdom: Animalia
- Phylum: Mollusca
- Class: Cephalopoda
- Order: Octopoda
- Family: Enteroctopodidae
- Genus: Enteroctopus
- Species: E. megalocyathus

Binomial name
- Enteroctopus megalocyathus (Gould, 1852)
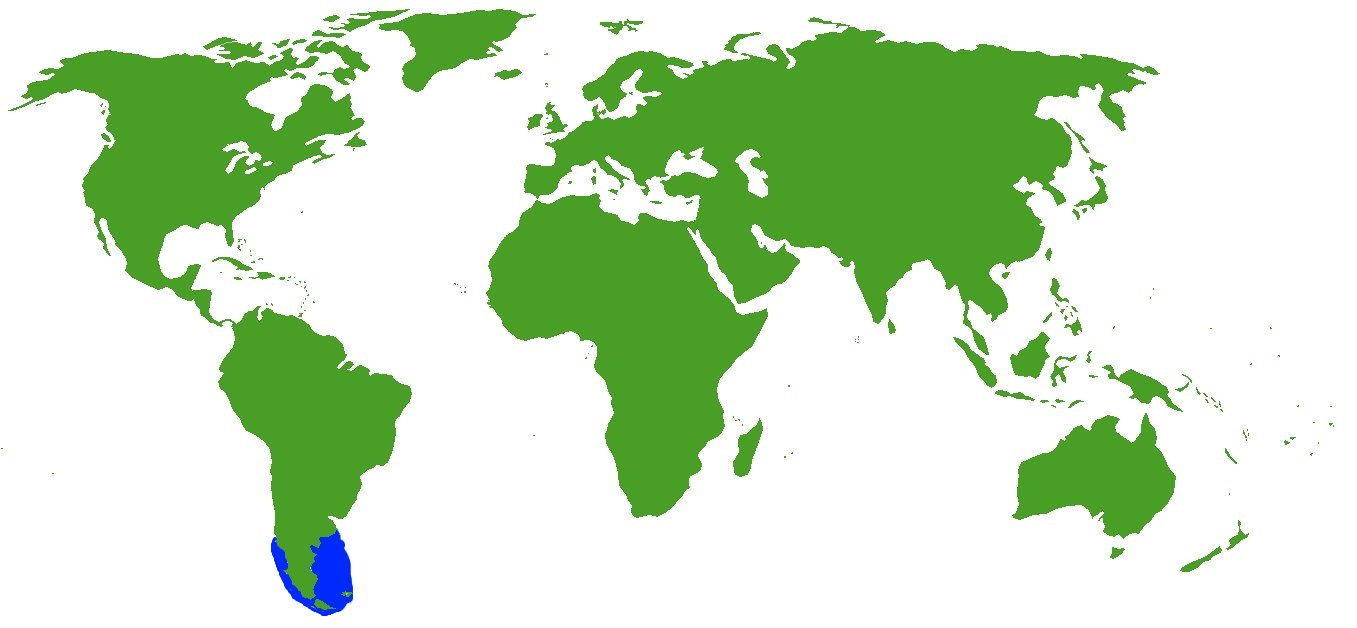

Synonyms
- Octopus megalocyathus A. A. Gould, 1852 (basionym); Octopus patagonicus Lönnberg, 1898; Polypus brucei Hoyle, 1912; Enteroctopus juttingi G. C. Robson, 1929

= Patagonian red octopus =

Medium-sized octopus, and the type species for the genus Enteroctopus

Enteroctopus megalocyathus, also known as Patagonian red octopus (EN), Pulpo del sur (Chile) and Pulpo colorado (Argentina), is a medium-sized octopus and the type species for the genus Enteroctopus.

== Description ==
Enteroctopus megalocyathus is a relatively large octopus, though not as large as some other giant octopuses like E. dofleini. This species has an average mass of around 4 kg, although some individuals have outweighed this and reached masses of 7.5 kg (M) and 8 kg (F). It has a mantle length of 22.5 cm and can exceed 1 m in total length, but another author reported a maximum total length in Chile of 1.3 m. Enteroctopus megalocyathus, like other octopuses in the genus Enteroctopus, has longitudinal folds and grooves on the body and large, paddle-like papillae.

== Distribution ==
This octopus is native to the southeastern coast of South America along the coasts of Argentina (Atlantic Ocean) and Chile (Pacific Ocean). In Chile ranges from north Patagonia, Chiloé Archipelago to Strait of Magellan and even more at 56°S, and in Argentina from the San Matías Gulf to the Beagle Channel, including the Falkland Islands and the Burdwood bank.

Its vertical range distribution in the water column is from 0 m depth (e.g. juvenile in intertidal rocky shore) to 220 m (720 ft) depth (e.g. seen in bottom crab traps) in Chile.

== Ecology ==
In general it is an opportunistic predator and eats crabs, teleost fishes, some molluscs e.g. clams, mussels, sea snails among other prey. In Southern Chile, specifically in Los Lagos region, the adult octopuses prefer to eat big crabs like jaiba reina, jaiba peluda, and even other E. megalocyathus as they are cannibalistic, as well as other species; meanwhile the younger octopuses prefer to eat jaiba mora, crab eggs, shrimp and squat lobster or langostino de los canales.

Like most octopuses, E. megalocyathus is a choice meal for many predators larger than it. It is a major dietary component of beaked skates (Dipturus chilensis), spiny dogfish (Squalus acanthias), and the South American sea lion (Otaria flavescens).

== Relation to humans ==
E. megalocyathus is one of the two commercially significant octopuses in Chilean waters, along with Octopus mimus. Yearly catch of the two octopuses fluctuates between 2,000 and 5,000 tons.

This species has high protein content and low-fat percentage. It also possesses a fast growth rate and easy weighing when fed with crab or crab moist in rearing conditions; thereby making it an ideal species to culture.

In Chile, the extraction ban date is from October 15 to March 15, and its range is from the Araucanía region to the Magallanes region, and in regular season, only specimens weighing more than 1 kg are allowed to be extracted.
