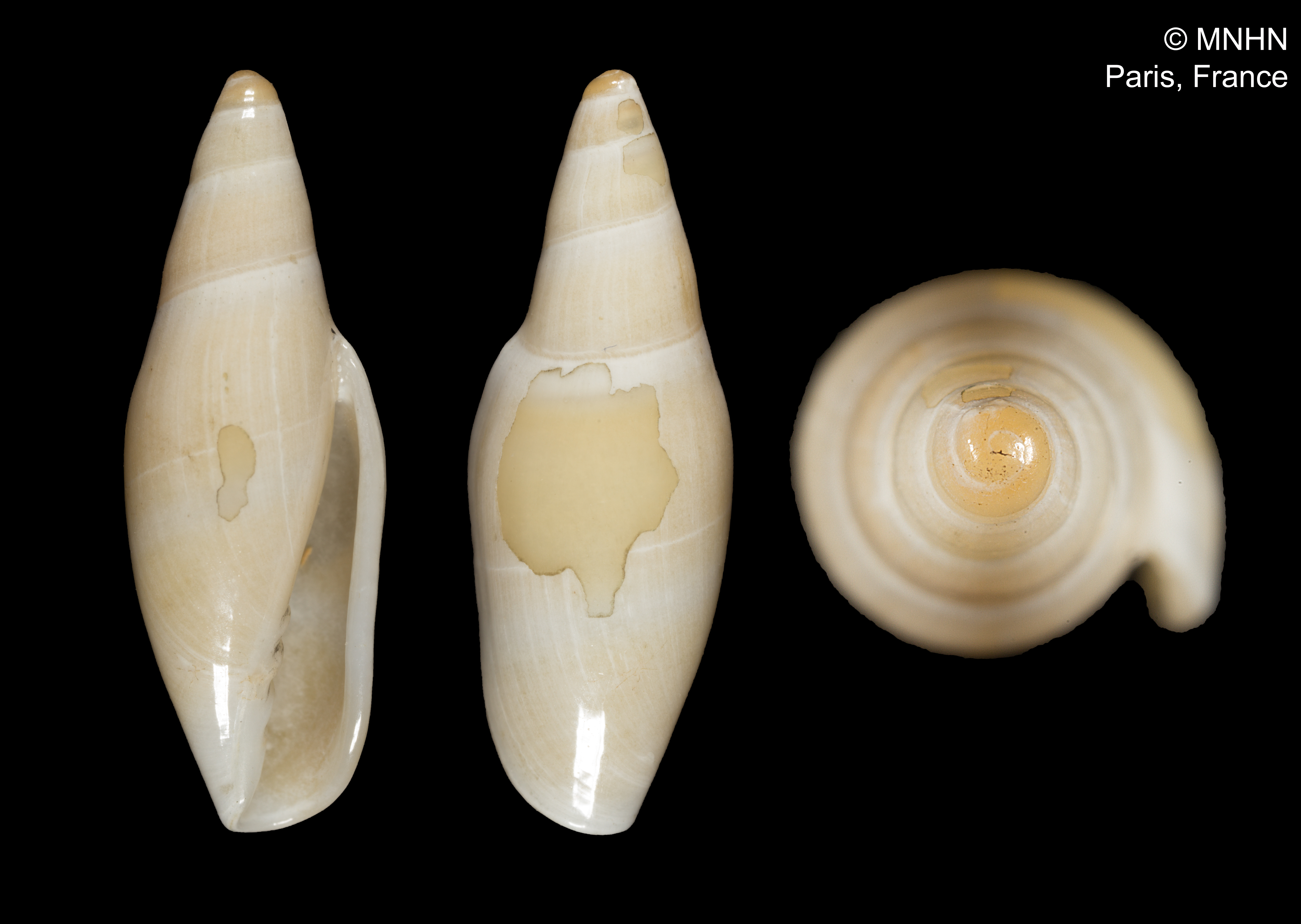
- Shell of Volvarina dozei (syntype at MNHN, Paris)

Scientific classification
- Kingdom: Animalia
- Phylum: Mollusca
- Class: Gastropoda
- Subclass: Caenogastropoda
- Order: Neogastropoda
- Family: Marginellidae
- Subfamily: Marginellinae
- Genus: Volvarina
- Species: V. dozei

Binomial name
- Volvarina dozei (Mabille & Rochebrune, 1889)

Synonyms
- Marginella dozei Mabille & Rochebrune, 1889 (original combination)

= Volvarina dozei =

Species of gastropod

Volvarina dozei is a species of sea snail, a marine gastropod mollusk in the family Marginellidae, the margin snails.

== Description ==
The length of the shell varies between 17 mm and 1805 mm its diameter 6 mm; the length of the aperture varies between 10 mm and 12 mm, its width between 2.5 mm and 3. mm.

(Original description in French) The elongated-subulate shell is very shiny, somewhat thick and solid. It is adorned with longitudinal streaks visible only under the focus of a strong magnifying glass, fleshy in color and adorned with a white zone occupying the middle of the body whorl and the sutural region in the others. The whorls are elongated, with a very obtuse apex tinged in red. The shell consists of six fairly convex whorls, fairly rapidly growing, separated by a very thin suture. The body whorl is very large, narrowly cylindrical, swollen-convex at its superior part and imperceptibly attenuated to the base, a little ascending at its termination. It forms a little more than two-thirds of the total height of the shell. The aperture is narrow, elongated and somewhat widened at the base. The columella is slightly thickened and shows four slightly prominent lamelliform teeth. The outer lip is a little sinuous and well edged.

== Distribution ==
This marine species occurs between the Strait of Magellan and the Falkland Islands.
