= Muusoctopus bizikovi =

Conservation status
- Least Concern (IUCN 3.1)

Scientific classification
- Kingdom: Animalia
- Phylum: Mollusca
- Class: Cephalopoda
- Order: Octopoda
- Family: Enteroctopodidae
- Genus: Muusoctopus
- Species: M. bizikovi

Binomial name
- Muusoctopus bizikovi Gleadall, Guerrero-Kommritz, Hochberg & Laptikhovsky, 2010

Species of octopus

Muusoctopus bizikovi is a species of octopus in the family Enteroctopodidae. It was first described in a paper by Ian G. Gleadall, Juergen Guerrero-Kommritz, Frederick G. Hochberg, and Vladimir V. Laptikhovsky in 2010 which described three inkless octopodid species from off the southeast coast of South America. The specimens were bycatch from the Falkland Islands fishery.

== Description ==
Muusoctopus bizikovi is a small, dark red, inkless octopus. Its ink gland is vestigial, and located between the digestive gland and the anus.
