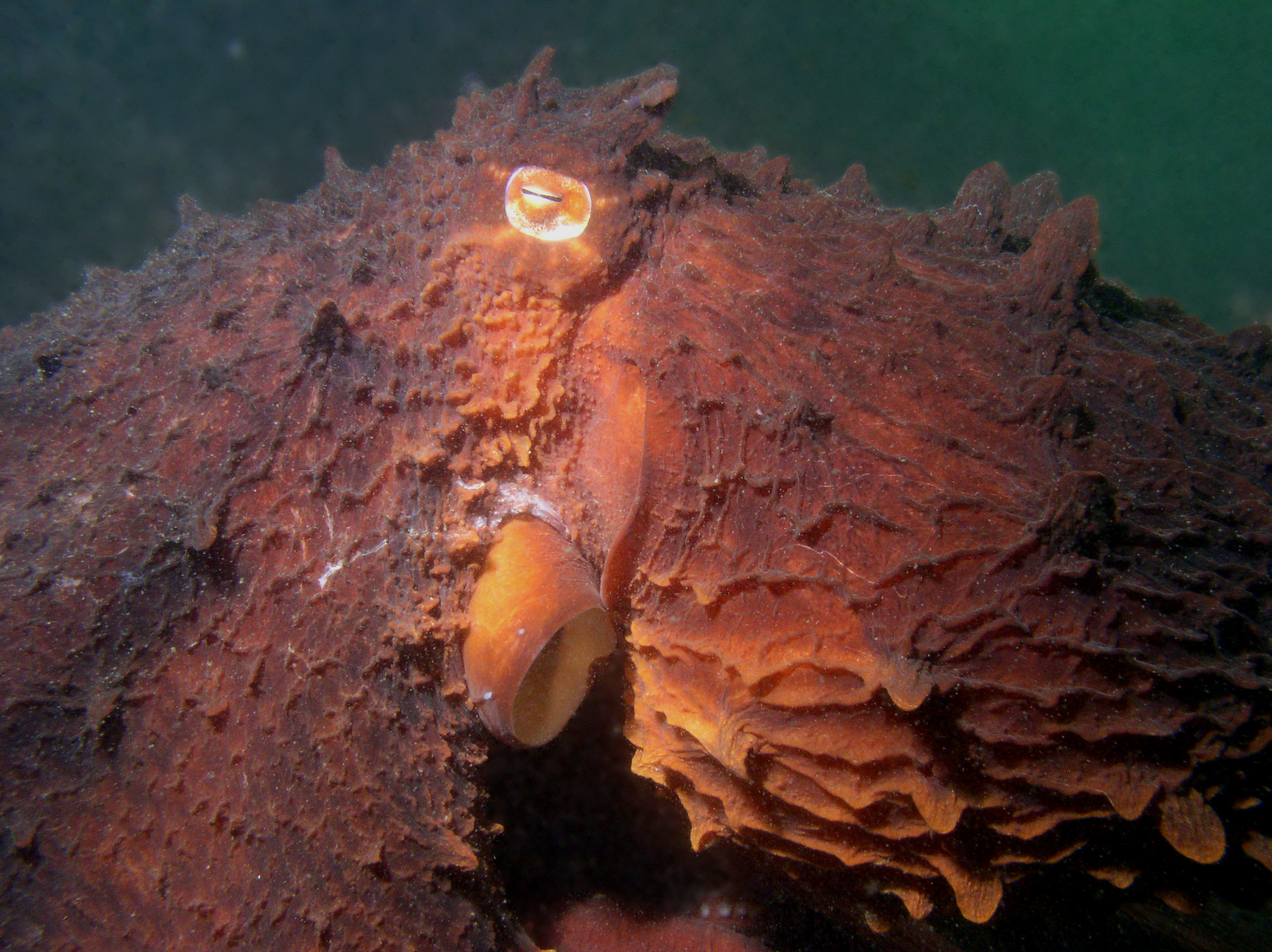
- Giant Pacific octopus showing longitudinal folds and paddle-like papillae diagnostic for the genus.

Scientific classification
- Kingdom: Animalia
- Phylum: Mollusca
- Class: Cephalopoda
- Order: Octopoda
- Family: Enteroctopodidae
- Genus: Enteroctopus; Rochebrune & Mabille, 1889

Type species
- Octopus megalocyathus Gould, 1852

Species
- Enteroctopus dofleini (Wülker, 1910); Enteroctopus magnificus (Villanueva, Sánchez & Compagno Roeleveld, 1992); Enteroctopus megalocyathus (Gould, 1952); Enteroctopus zealandicus Benham, 1944

= Enteroctopus =

Giant octopus

Genus of cephalopods known as the "giant octopuses"

Enteroctopus is an octopus genus whose members are sometimes known as giant octopuses.

== Etymology ==
The generic name Enteroctopus was created by Alphonse Tremeau de Rochebrune and Jules François Mabille in 1887 and published in 1889, joining Ancient Greek ἔντερον 'gut' and ὀκτώπους, thus 'octopus [with arms similar to] guts.'

== Description ==
Enteroctopus is a genus of generally temperate octopuses. Members of this genus are characterized by their large size and are often known as giant octopuses. Enteroctopus species have distinct longitudinal wrinkles or folds dorsally and laterally on their bodies. Their heads are distinctly narrower than the mantle width. The hectocotylus of the males in this genus, found on the third right arm, is long and narrow in comparison with other genera in the family Octopodidae, often comprising one-fifth the length of the arm. Octopuses in this genus have large, paddle-like papillae instead of the more conical papillae in other octopus genera.

== Species ==
Genus Enteroctopus at present consists of four species, tabulated below:

Image	Scientific name	Common name	Distribution
	Enteroctopus dofleini	giant Pacific octopus	coastal North Pacific, along California, Oregon, Washington, British Columbia, Alaska, Russia, Japan, and the Korean Peninsula
	Enteroctopus magnificus	southern giant octopus	waters off Namibia and South Africa.
	Enteroctopus megalocyathus	southern red octopus	southeastern coast of South America along the coasts of Argentina and Chile up to the Chiloé Archipelago, and the Falkland Islands.
	Enteroctopus zealandicus	yellow octopus	waters surrounding New Zealand.

=== Type species ===
E. membranaceus has often been regarded as type species of the genus, not because it was designated as such by Rochebrune and Mabille when they erected the genus, but because it was the first named species in the genus. Robson in his 1929 monograph of octopods regarded E. membranaceus as a species dubium because the original description was insufficient to identify an individual species, the holotype was an immature specimen, and the type specimen no longer existed.

As such, the genus was considered invalid until Hochberg resurrected it in 1998. Hochberg noted that Robson had considered E. membranaceus a junior synonym of E. megalocyathus, the second species assigned to the genus by Rochebrune and Mabille in their 1889 description. Additionally, since Rochebrune and Mabille did not actually assign type status to E. membranaceus, Hochberg concluded that Enteroctopus was indeed a valid genus and transferred type-species status to E. megalocyathus based on his conclusion that E. megalocyathus and E. membranaceus are the same species.

== Distribution ==
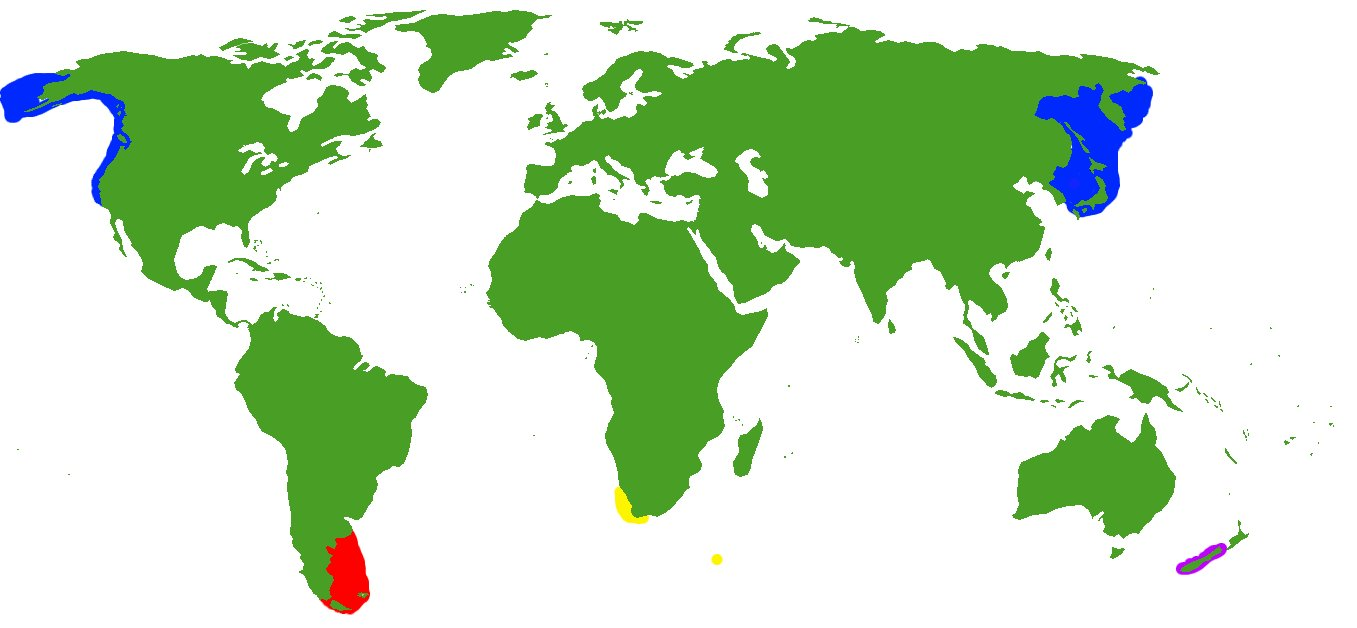
Range map of Enteroctopus species. E. dofleini in blue, E. megalocyathus in red, E. magnificus in yellow, and E. zealandicus in purple.

Species in the genus Enteroctopus are restricted to the temperate areas of the Northern and Southern Hemispheres. E. dofleini is the only member of the genus found in the Northern Hemisphere, and also the most widely distributed: It is found from Southern California, along the North Pacific Rim to Japan, including the Okhotsk and Bering Seas. The other three species are found in the Southern Hemisphere; E. megalocyathus occurs on the southeastern coast of South America, E. magnificus on the southwestern coast of Africa from Namibia to Port Elizabeth, South Africa, and E. zealandicus in temperate New Zealand.

== Size ==
The member of this genus that best embodies the common name "giant octopus" is Enteroctopus dofleini, which holds the record of being the world's largest octopus based on direct measurements of a 71 kilograms (157 pounds) individual, weighed live. (Note: The size record is held by an E. dofleini specimen that was 9 meters (30 feet) across and weighed more than 270 kilograms (600 pounds). Averages are more like 5 meters (16 feet) and 50 kilograms (110 pounds).) This octopus had a total length near to 3.5 metres (11 feet). The remaining members of the genus are substantially smaller, with E. megalocyathus having an average mass of 4 kilograms (8.8 pounds) and reaching a total length of 1.0 metre (3.3 feet). E. magnificus reaches a total length of around 1.5 metres (5 feet).

== See also ==
- Giant squid
- Colossal squid
- Cephalopod size
- Kraken
- Lusca
