= Mangelia hyemalis =

Scientific classification
- Kingdom: Animalia
- Phylum: Mollusca
- Class: Gastropoda
- Subclass: Caenogastropoda
- Order: Neogastropoda
- Superfamily: Conoidea
- Family: Mangeliidae
- Genus: Mangelia
- Species: M. hyemalis

Binomial name
- Mangelia hyemalis (Mabille, J. & A.-T. de Rochebrune in Rochebrune, A.-T. de & J. Mabille, 1888)

Synonyms
- Pleurotoma hyemalis Mabille & Rochebrune, 1889

Species of gastropod

Mangelia hyemalis is a species of sea snail, a marine gastropod mollusk in the family Mangeliidae.

== Description ==
The length of the shell attains 30 mm.

The shell has a fusiform shape. It is slightly translucent but still solid. The spire has an elongated conical shape. The protoconch is papillar, white and shining. The shell contains 9 whorls. They are slightly impressed towards the suture. They are at first smooth but then become obliquely costulate and rugose. The narrow aperture has an elongated oval shape with on top a large and deep sinus. The siphonal canal is very short and wide open. The columella is slightly arcuate and is thickened at its base.

== Distribution ==
This marine species occurs off Tierra del Fuego.
