= Myxine capensis =

Cape hagfish

Conservation status
- Least Concern (IUCN 3.1)

Scientific classification
- Kingdom: Animalia
- Phylum: Chordata
- Infraphylum: Agnatha
- Superclass: Cyclostomi
- Class: Myxini
- Order: Myxiniformes
- Family: Myxinidae
- Genus: Myxine
- Species: M. capensis

Binomial name
- Myxine capensis Regan, 1913

Species of jawless fish

Myxine capensis, the Cape hagfish, is a species of jawless fish in the family Myxinidae.

It inhabits muddy bottoms on the continental shelf off the coast of southern Africa, from southern Namibia, along the coast of South Africa, east to southern Mozambique. Despite heavy fishing pressure in its range, no major population declines have been reported, so it is considered a species of Least Concern on the IUCN Red List. It is thought to be a frequent prey item of the southern giant octopus (Enteroctopus magnificus).
