= Bathynectes muelleri =

Bathynectes muelleri Temporal range: Mid Miocene 16.3–12.8 Ma

Scientific classification
- Kingdom: Animalia
- Phylum: Arthropoda
- Clade: Pancrustacea
- Class: Malacostraca
- Order: Decapoda
- Suborder: Pleocyemata
- Infraorder: Brachyura
- Family: Polybiidae
- Genus: Bathynectes
- Species: B. muelleri

Binomial name
- Bathynectes muelleri Ossó and Stalennuy, 2011

Extinct species of crab

Bathynectes muelleri is an extinct species of polybiid crab and the oldest known species of the genus Bathynectes. It lived in the Central and Western Paratethys of modern-day Ukraine and Slovenia during the Badenian age (Langhian, middle Miocene ). While extant species of Bathynectes live mainly in deep water habitats, B. muelleri fossils were found in sediments indicative of shallow water habitats, suggesting the earliest Bathynectes originated in shallow waters, and descendent species migrated to deep-water habitats.
