= Myxine fernholmi =

Fernholm's hagfish

Conservation status
- Least Concern (IUCN 3.1)

Scientific classification
- Kingdom: Animalia
- Phylum: Chordata
- Infraphylum: Agnatha
- Superclass: Cyclostomi
- Class: Myxini
- Order: Myxiniformes
- Family: Myxinidae
- Genus: Myxine
- Species: M. fernholmi

Binomial name
- Myxine fernholmi Wisner & McMillan, 1995

Species of jawless fish

Myxine fernholmi (Myxine: Ancient Greek word for slimy fish), also known as Fernholm's hagfish, is a species of jawless fish in the family Myxinidae. It is named after Swedish ichthyologist Bo Fernholm.

== Details ==
It is found around the Falkland Islands and the Burdwood Bank, with a single specimen also known from central Chile, off the coast of San Antonio. Although only 4 specimens have been caught, high densities of hagfish that are assumed to be this species have been recorded at depths of 900–1,750 metres (2,950–5,740 ft) on surveys of the scavenging fauna of the Patagonian Shelf. As it lives beyond the depth of major fishing trawlers in the region and there are no known direct threats to it, it is considered Least Concern on the IUCN Red List.

The complete mitogenome of this species was analyzed for the first time in 2019.
