= Myxine mcmillanae =

Caribbean hagfish

Conservation status
- Least Concern (IUCN 3.1)

Scientific classification
- Kingdom: Animalia
- Phylum: Chordata
- Infraphylum: Agnatha
- Superclass: Cyclostomi
- Class: Myxini
- Order: Myxiniformes
- Family: Myxinidae
- Genus: Myxine
- Species: M. mcmillanae

Binomial name
- Myxine mcmillanae Hensley, 1991

Species of jawless fish

Myxine mcmillanae, the Caribbean hagfish, is a species of hagfish. It is a scaleless, eel-like fish found in Caribbean waters that feeds off material from the surface that drifts down. It is rarely seen as it lives in very deep water from 2,300-4,950 ft (700-1,500 m) and likes to burrow into the mud. Their bodies are grey with contrasting white heads. They have seven internal gills connected to a single opening on each side of the body.

== Etymology ==
The hagfish is named in honor of marine biologist Charmion B. McMillan (b. 1925), of the Scripps Institution of Oceanography, for her contributions to the science of hagfish.
