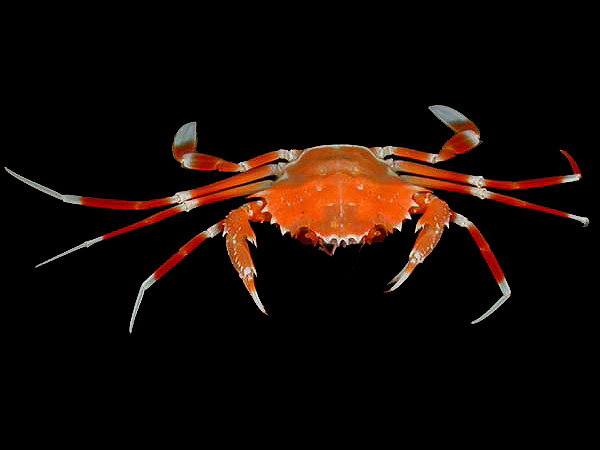

Scientific classification
- Kingdom: Animalia
- Phylum: Arthropoda
- Class: Malacostraca
- Order: Decapoda
- Suborder: Pleocyemata
- Infraorder: Brachyura
- Family: Polybiidae
- Genus: Bathynectes
- Species: B. longispina

Binomial name
- Bathynectes longispina Stimpson, 1879

Synonyms
- Geryon incertus Miers, 1886

= Bathyal swimming crab =

Species of crab

The bathyal swimming crab, Bathynectes longispina, is a species of crab in the family Polybiidae.

This species lives on seamounts and knolls, at depths as great as 600 metres (2,000 ft). It appears similar to other members of the portunid family, but has reduced swimming dactyls and long walking legs. As an adaptation to deep water, it has large eyes.
