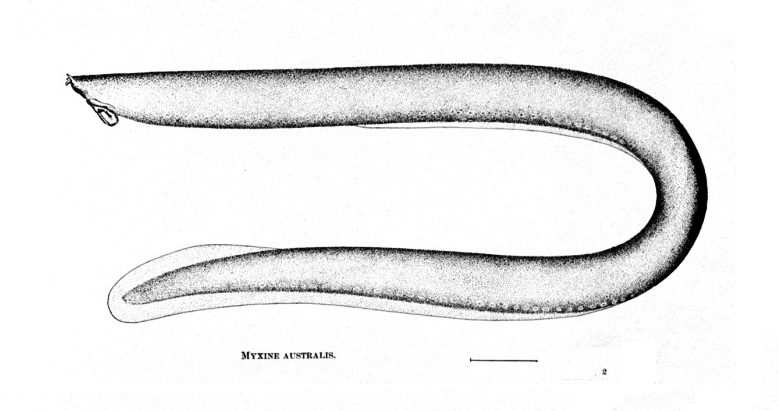

Conservation status
- Least Concern (IUCN 3.1)

Scientific classification
- Kingdom: Animalia
- Phylum: Chordata
- Infraphylum: Agnatha
- Class: Myxini
- Order: Myxiniformes
- Family: Myxinidae
- Genus: Myxine
- Species: M. australis

Binomial name
- Myxine australis Jenyns, 1842
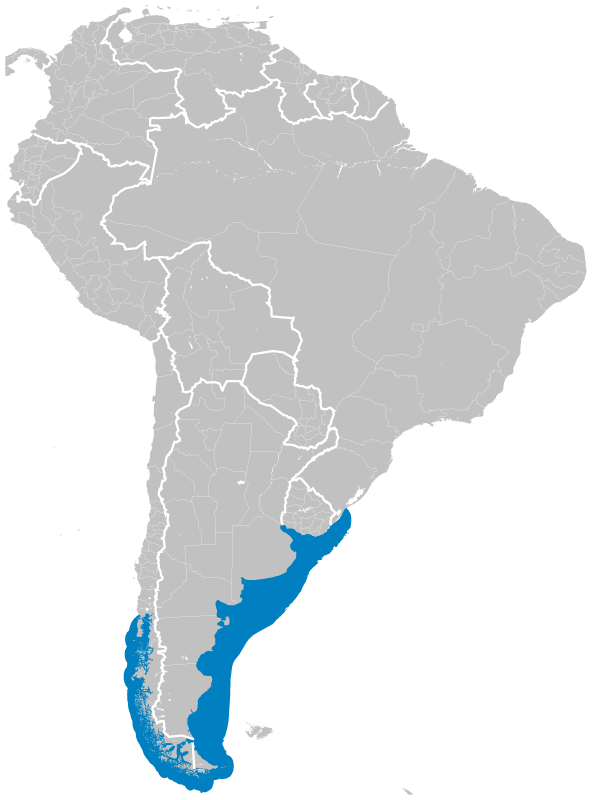
- Southern hagfish range.

Synonyms
- Myxine acutifrons Garman, 1899

= Southern hagfish =

Species of jawless fish

The southern hagfish (Myxine australis) is a hagfish of the genus Myxine.

== Description ==
It is a harmless scaleless, eel-like animal with a pinkish body, a whitish head and a whitish mid dorsal stripe. The size of captured specimens ranges between 91 and 394 mm (3.6 and 15.5 in).

The southern hagfish is found in the cold waters of the Southwestern Atlantic Ocean from the coasts off Southwestern Brazil down to the Southern Ocean and the Tierra del Fuego and the Patagonian coasts of Chile and Argentina, including the Strait of Magellan.

It lives hidden in the mud in relatively shallow water, between 10 and 100 metres (30 and 330 ft). Its life cycle is unknown.

Hagfish have eyes embedded in their head with clear spots. They feed on dead fish on the bottom of the ocean floors, low temperatures, and high pressures.
