= White-headed hagfish =

Conservation status
- Least Concern (IUCN 3.1)

Scientific classification
- Kingdom: Animalia
- Phylum: Chordata
- Infraphylum: Agnatha
- Superclass: Cyclostomi
- Class: Myxini
- Order: Myxiniformes
- Family: Myxinidae
- Genus: Myxine
- Species: M. ios

Binomial name
- Myxine ios Fernholm, 1981

Species of jawless fish

The white-headed hagfish (Myxine ios) is a species of jawless fish of the family Myxinidae (hagfish).

Its scientific name alludes to the Institute of Oceanographic Sciences (IOS), Wormley, Surrey, which supplied the holotype.

== Distribution ==
Myxine ios is a marine bathydemersal fish, living at depths of 614–1,625 m (2,014–5,331 ft). It is non-migratory, living in the North Atlantic waters off Iceland, Ireland and the western Sahara.

== Description ==
The white-headed hagfish may grow up to 57 centimetres (1.87 ft) long. It is a seven-gilled hagfish; it can be distinguished from related species by its large number of tooth cusps: between 44 and 51. The Irish M. ios population is distinguished from the southern variety by its white head and whitish middorsal or midventral line.

== Behaviour ==
M. ios is a scavenger of dead or disabled fish, which it bores into. Its eggs are large, 2–3 centimetres (0.79–1.18 in).
