= Myxine debueni =

Magellan hagfish

Conservation status
- Data Deficient (IUCN 3.1)

Scientific classification
- Kingdom: Animalia
- Phylum: Chordata
- Infraphylum: Agnatha
- Superclass: Cyclostomi
- Class: Myxini
- Order: Myxiniformes
- Family: Myxinidae
- Genus: Myxine
- Species: M. debueni

Binomial name
- Myxine debueni Wisner & McMillan, 1995

Species of fish

Myxine debueni, the Magellan hagfish, is a species of jawless fish in the family Myxinidae.

It is found off the coast of southernmost Chile, where it is known only from two specimens collected near Dawson Island in the Strait of Magellan prior to 1970. It may be threatened by shipping, dredging, and fishing activities, but very little is known about the species due to the lack of surveys.

It is named in honor of Spanish ichthyologist Fernando de Buen y Lozano.
