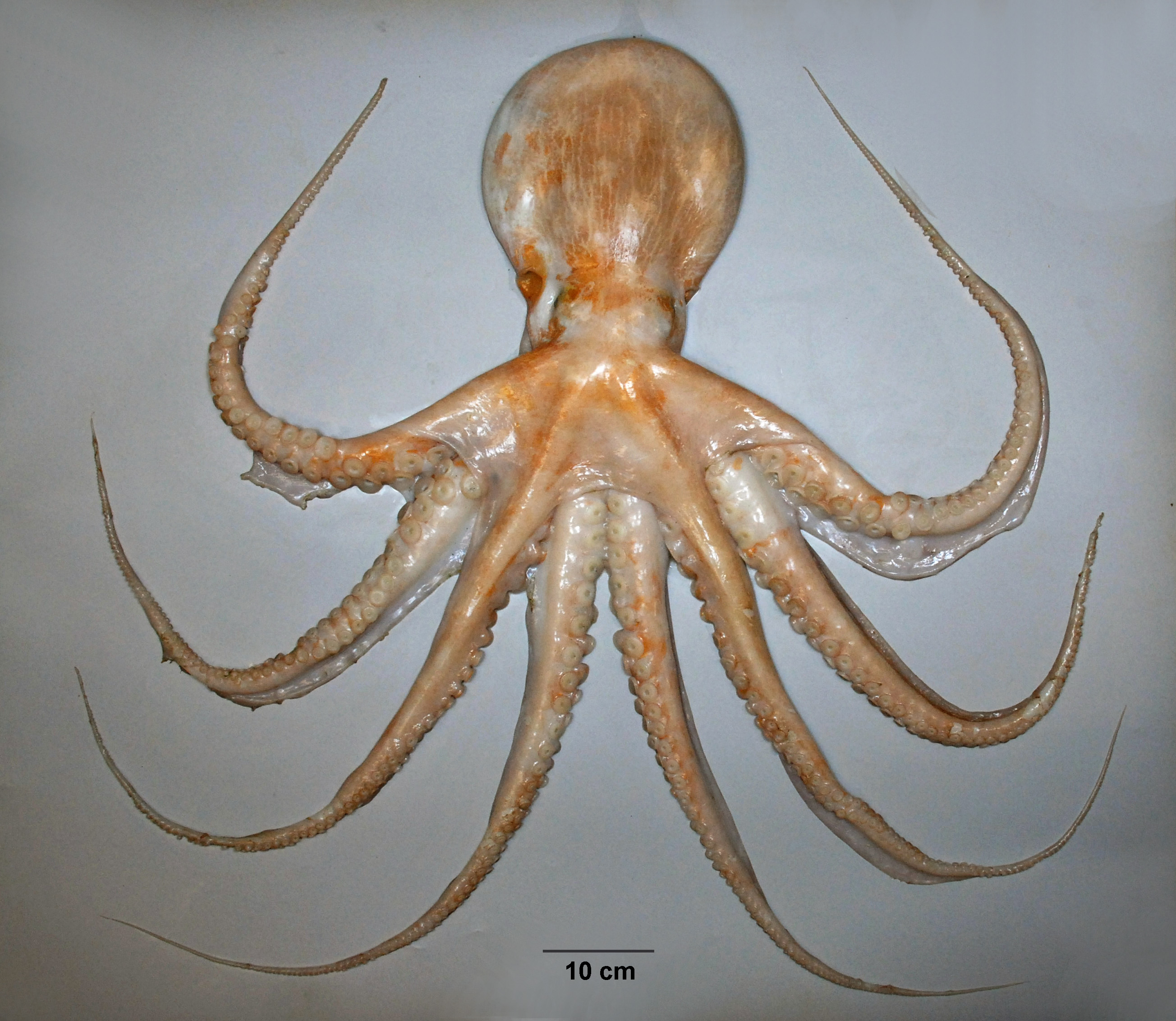
- Enteroctopus zealandicus. Photo by Darren Stevens, NIWA

Conservation status
- Data Deficient (IUCN 3.1)

Scientific classification
- Kingdom: Animalia
- Phylum: Mollusca
- Class: Cephalopoda
- Order: Octopoda
- Family: Enteroctopodidae
- Genus: Enteroctopus
- Species: E. zealandicus

Binomial name
- Enteroctopus zealandicus (Benham, 1944)
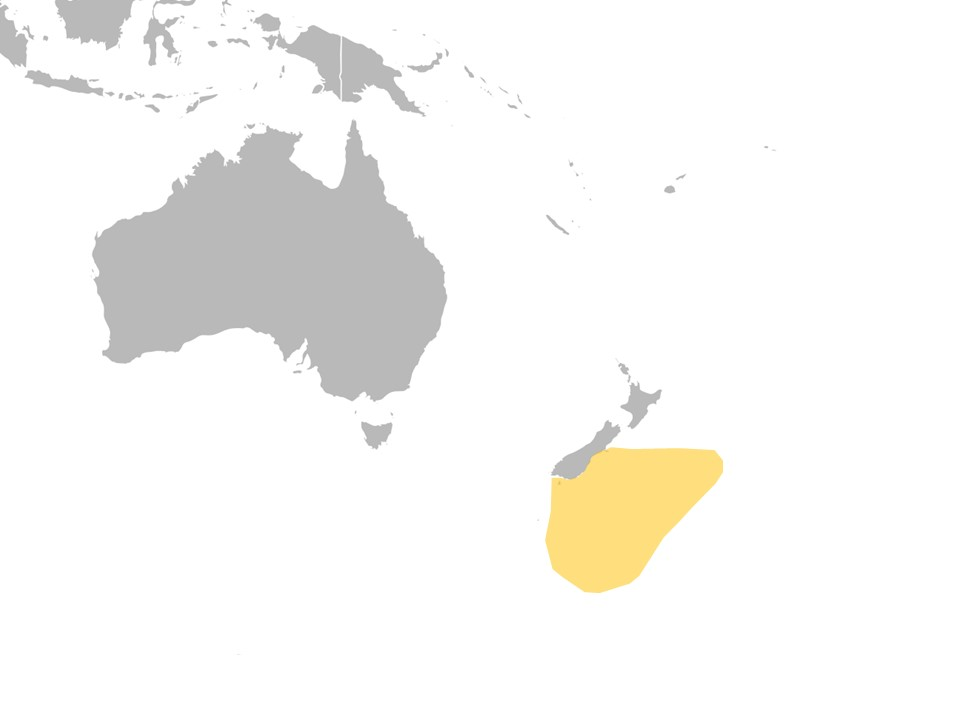
- Range of Enteroctopus zealandicus

Synonyms
- Octopus zealandicus Dell, 1951

= Enteroctopus zealandicus =

Yellow octopus

Species of mollusc

Enteroctopus zealandicus, the yellow octopus, is a large octopus of the genus Enteroctopus. It is endemic to the waters surrounding New Zealand.

== Description ==
Enteroctopus zealandicus has the distinctive characteristics of the genus Enteroctopus, including longitudinal folds on the body and large paddle-like papillae. E. zealandicus is a large octopus, reaching a total length of at least 1.4 metres (4 ft 7 in), though few whole samples have been collected and this is only a guide.

== Range and habitat ==
Enteroctopus zealandicus is endemic to New Zealand. Samples have been collected along the east coast of the south island, Chatham Rise, Campbell Plateau, Stewart, Auckland and Antipodes Islands; and from the surface down to 530 metres (1,740 ft) depth. There is an absence of published information about the preferred habitat or diet of this species.

== Predators ==
Enteroctopus zealandicus is one of the most important prey of New Zealand sea lions at the Auckland Islands and Campbell Island, in the New Zealand Subantarctic. It has also been identified from beaks found in the gut of beached whales.
