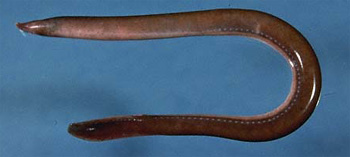
- Atlantic Hagfish (Myxine glutinosa)

Scientific classification
- Kingdom: Animalia
- Phylum: Chordata
- Infraphylum: Agnatha
- Class: Myxini
- Order: Myxiniformes
- Family: Myxinidae
- Subfamily: Myxininae
- Genus: Myxine; Linnaeus, 1758

Type species
- Myxine glutinosa Linnaeus, 1758

Synonyms
- Gastrobranchus Bloch, 1791; Muraenoblenna Lacepede, 1803 non Kaup, 1856; Anopsus Rafinesque, 1815

= Myxine =

Genus of jawless fishes

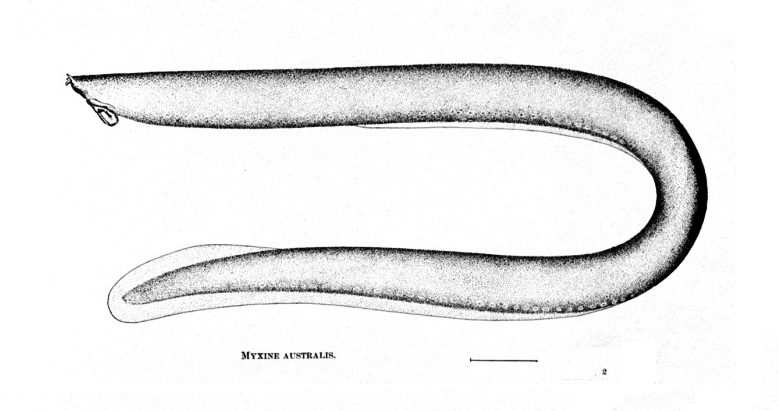
Southern hagfish (Myxine australis) mid-19th century drawing by Günther

Myxine /mɪkˈsaɪniː/ is a genus of hagfish, from the Greek μυξῖνος (myxinos, "slimy"). It is the type genus of the class Myxini.

In 2021, three new species of Myxine were described from the Galápagos including M. phantasma, the only species of Myxine to not have melanin-based pigments.

== Species ==
- Myxine affinis Günther, 1870 (Patagonian hagfish)
- Myxine australis Jenyns, 1842 (southern hagfish)
- Myxine capensis Regan, 1913 (Cape hagfish)
- Myxine circifrons Garman, 1899 (whiteface hagfish)
- Myxine debueni Wisner & C. B. McMillan, 1995 (Magellan hagfish)
- Myxine fernholmi Wisner & C. B. McMillan, 1995 (Fernholm's hagfish)
- Myxine floyd Mincarone, Kurtz, Di Dario & Gonçalves, 2026
- Myxine formosana H. K. Mok & C. H. Kuo, 2001 (Formosa hagfish)
- Myxine garmani D. S. Jordan & Snyder, 1901 (Garman's hagfish)
- Myxine glutinosa Linnaeus, 1758 (Atlantic hagfish)
- Myxine greggi Mincarone, Plachetzki, McCord, Winegard, Fernholm, Gonzalez & Fudge, 2021 (Gregg's hagfish)
- Myxine hubbsi Wisner & C. B. McMillan, 1995 (Hubbs' hagfish)
- Myxine hubbsoides Wisner & C. B. McMillan, 1995
- Myxine ios Fernholm, 1981 (white-headed hagfish)
- Myxine jespersenae Møller, Feld, I. H. Poulsen, Thomsen & Thormar, 2005 (Jespersen's hagfish)
- Myxine knappi Wisner & C. B. McMillan, 1995 (Knapp's hagfish)
- Myxine kuoi H. K. Mok, 2002 (Kuo's hagfish)
- Myxine limosa Girard, 1859 (Girard's Atlantic hagfish)
- Myxine martinii Mincarone, Plachetzki, McCord, Winegard, Fernholm, Gonzalez & Fudge, 2021 (Martini's hagfish)
- Myxine mccoskeri Wisner & C. B. McMillan, 1995 (McCosker's hagfish)
- Myxine mcmillanae Hensley, 1991 (Caribbean hagfish)
- Myxine paucidens Regan, 1913 (Hyalonema hagfish)
- Myxine pequenoi Wisner & C. B. McMillan, 1995 (Chilean hagfish)
- Myxine phantasma Mincarone, Plachetzki, McCord, Winegard, Fernholm, Gonzalez & Fudge, 2021 (ghost hagfish)
- Myxine robinsora Wisner & C. B. McMillan, 1995 (Wisner's Caribbean hagfish)
- Myxine sotoi Mincarone, 2001 (Brazilian hagfish)
