= Myxine affinis =

Patagonian hagfish

Conservation status
- Least Concern (IUCN 3.1)

Scientific classification
- Kingdom: Animalia
- Phylum: Chordata
- Infraphylum: Agnatha
- Superclass: Cyclostomi
- Class: Myxini
- Order: Myxiniformes
- Family: Myxinidae
- Genus: Myxine
- Species: M. affinis

Binomial name
- Myxine affinis Günther, 1870

Species of jawless fish

Myxine affinis, the Patagonian hagfish, is a species of jawless fish in the family Myxinidae.

It inhabits relatively shallow waters off the coast of Tierra del Fuego in southernmost Argentina and Chile. Despite its relatively restricted range, it is not thought to be at heavy risk due to a lack of fishing within its range, although crustacean trap fisheries have recently opened in the area. For this reason, it is considered a species of Least Concern on the IUCN Red List.
