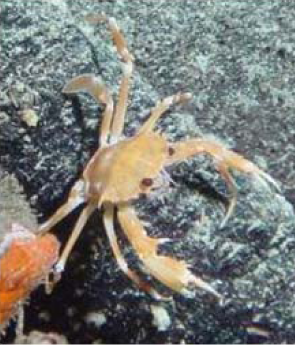

Scientific classification
- Domain: Eukaryota
- Kingdom: Animalia
- Phylum: Arthropoda
- Class: Malacostraca
- Order: Decapoda
- Suborder: Pleocyemata
- Infraorder: Brachyura
- Family: Polybiidae
- Genus: Bathynectes
- Species: B. piperitus

Binomial name
- Bathynectes piperitus Manning & Holthuis, 1981

= Bathynectes piperitus =

Species of crustacean

Bathynectes piperitus is a species of crab in the family Polybiidae. It is found in Angola, Cabinda, Cape Verde, Fao Fishing Area, Gabon, Ghana, Guinea, Guinea-Bissau, Ivory Coast, Liberia, Senegal, and West Africa.
