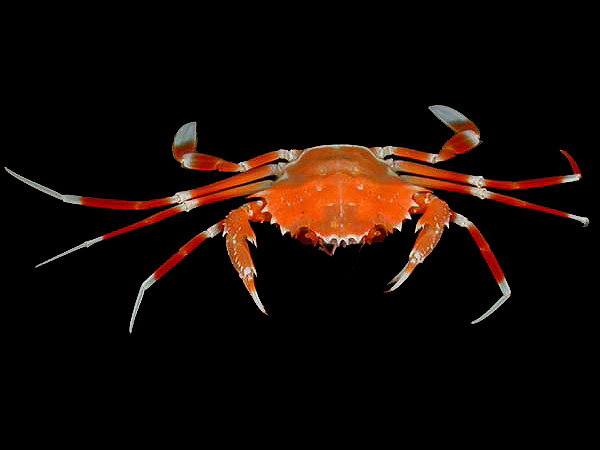
- Bathyal swimming crab (Bathynectes longispina)

Scientific classification
- Domain: Eukaryota
- Kingdom: Animalia
- Phylum: Arthropoda
- Class: Malacostraca
- Order: Decapoda
- Suborder: Pleocyemata
- Infraorder: Brachyura
- Family: Polybiidae
- Genus: Bathynectes; Manning & Holthuis, 1981

Type species
- Bathynectes longispina Stimpson, 1871

= Bathynectes =

Genus of crabs

Bathynectes is a genus of crabs in the family Polybiidae.

== Species ==
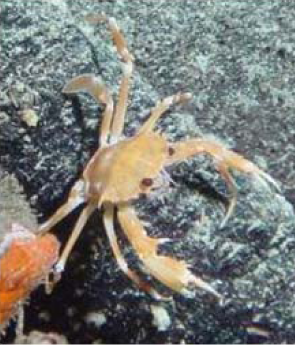
Bathynectes piperitus

- Bathynectes brevispina Stimpson, 1871
- Bathynectes longipes (Risso, 1816)
- Bathynectes longispina Stimpson, 1871
- Bathynectes maravigna (Prestandrea, 1839)
- Bathynectes piperitus Manning & Holthuis, 1981
- †Bathynectes muelleri Ossó & Stalennuy, 2011
