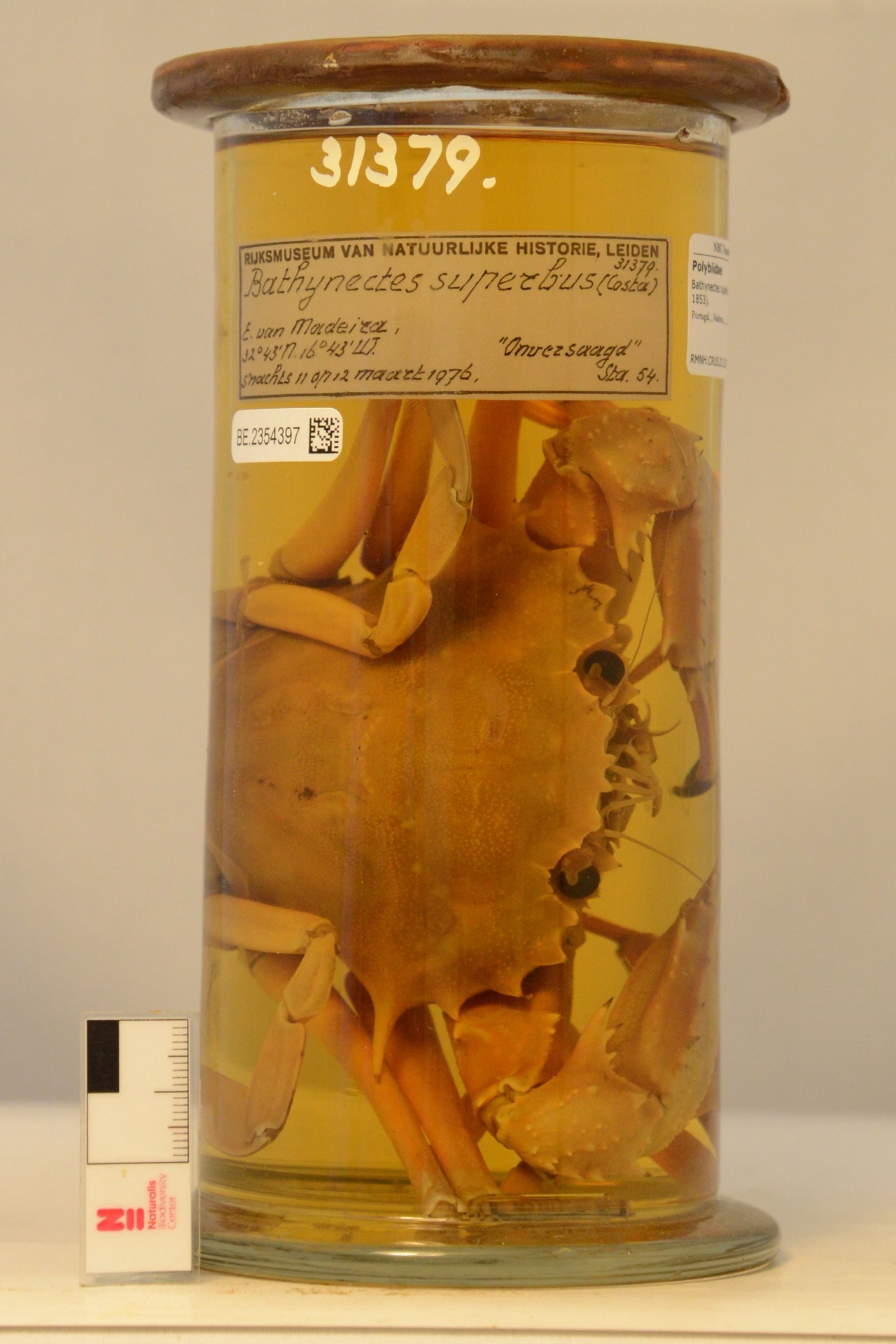
- Preserved specimen collected from Madeira

Scientific classification
- Kingdom: Animalia
- Phylum: Arthropoda
- Clade: Pancrustacea
- Class: Malacostraca
- Order: Decapoda
- Suborder: Pleocyemata
- Infraorder: Brachyura
- Family: Polybiidae
- Genus: Bathynectes
- Species: B. maravigna

Binomial name
- Bathynectes maravigna (Prestandrea, 1839)

= Bathynectes maravigna =

Species of crab

Bathynectes maravigna, the deepsea swimming crab, is a deep-sea species of portunoid crab found in the North Atlantic.

== Classification ==
Bathynectes maravigna was first described in 1839 in the genus Portunus by Nicolo Prestandrea, and several species described later by other authors have since been synonymized with B. maravigna.

It is sometimes commonly known as the "deepsea swimming crab".

== Distribution ==
Bathynectes maravigna is a North Atlantic species found on both the east and west coasts of that part of the ocean. It is found from the American state of Massachusetts south to Florida on the west coast and from around Iceland, the Faroe islands and Norway south to around Morocco on the east coast, as well as throughout the Mediterranean.
