= Liocarcinus =

Scientific classification
- Kingdom: Animalia
- Phylum: Arthropoda
- Clade: Pancrustacea
- Class: Malacostraca
- Order: Decapoda
- Suborder: Pleocyemata
- Infraorder: Brachyura
- Superfamily: Portunoidea
- Family: Polybiidae
- Genus: †Liocarcinus; Stimpson, 1858

Type species
- Portunus holsatus Fabricius, 1798

Genus of crabs

Liocarcinus is an extinct genus of crabs in the family Polybiidae.

== Species ==
Liocarcinus contains the following species:

- †Liocarcinus oligocenicus (Paucă, 1929)
- †Liocarcinus ottnangensis (Bachmayer, 1953)
- †Liocarcinus priscus Beschin, De Angeli, Checchi & Zarantonello, 2016
- †Liocarcinus rakosensis (Lőrenthey in Lőrenthey & Beurlen, 1929)
- †Liocarcinus vindobonensis (Bachmayer, 1950)
