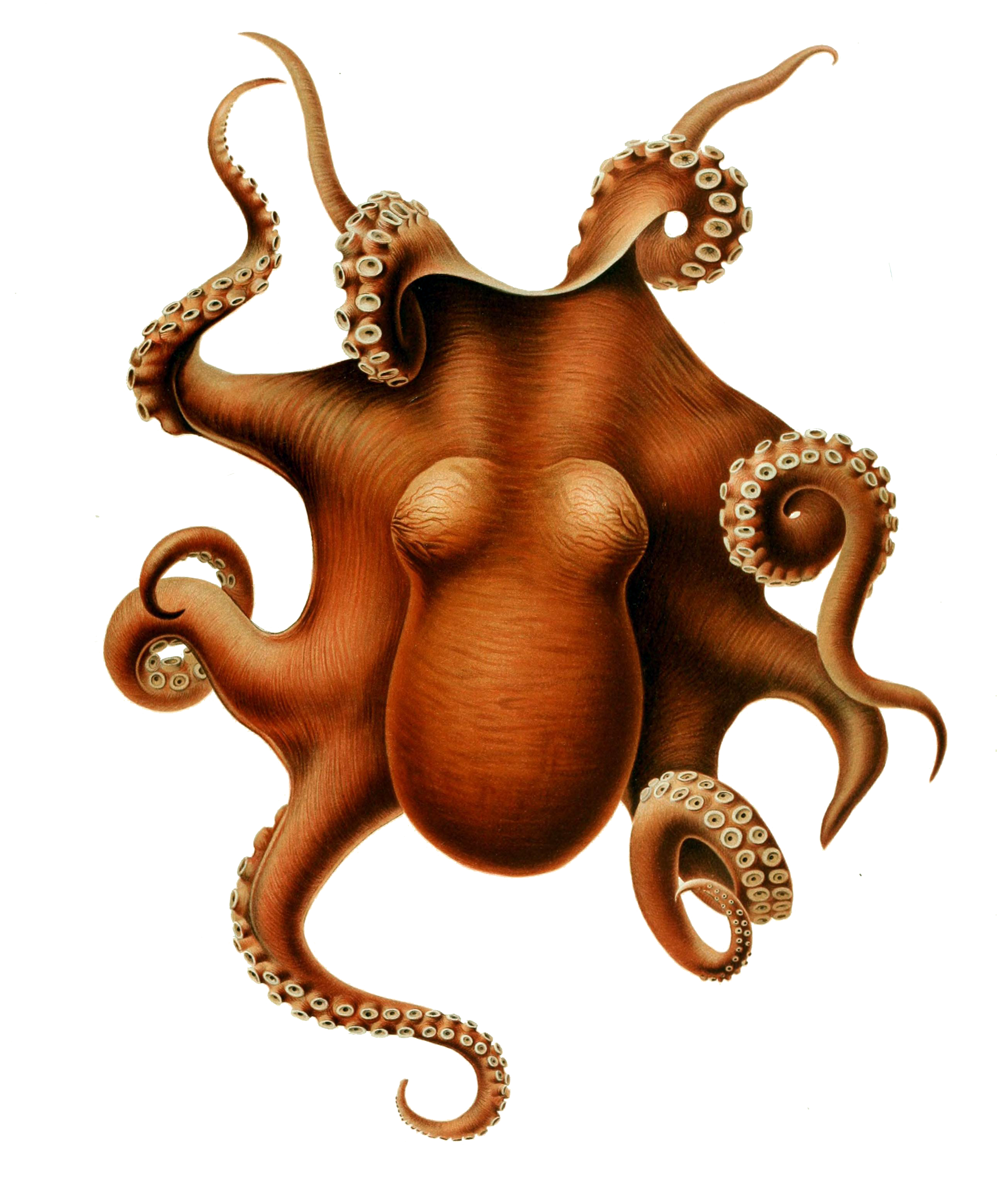
- Muusoctopus levis

Scientific classification
- Kingdom: Animalia
- Phylum: Mollusca
- Class: Cephalopoda
- Order: Octopoda
- Family: Enteroctopodidae
- Genus: Muusoctopus; Gleadall, 2004

Type species
- Octopus januarii Hoyle, 1885

= Muusoctopus =

Genus of molluscs

Muusoctopus is a cosmopolitan genus of deep-sea octopus from the family Enteroctopodidae. These are small to medium-sized octopuses which lack an ink sac. Recent work has suggested that these octopuses originated in the North Atlantic and subsequently moved into the North Pacific while the species in the Southern Hemisphere are descended from multiple invasions from northern oceans.

These octopus species are known to spawn a single batch of eggs instead of producing batches of them over time. As much as these octopuses may release eggs simultaneously or in batches in an extremely short period, they are mostly not prolific spawners.

== Species ==
These species are currently classified as members of the genus Muusoctopus:

- Muusoctopus abruptus (Sasaki, 1920)
- Muusoctopus aegir A. V. Golikov, Gudmundsson & Sabirov, 2023
- Muusoctopus berryi (Robson, 1924)
- Muusoctopus bizikovi Gleadall, Guerrero-Kommritz, Hochberg & Laptikhovsky, 2010
- Muusoctopus canthylus (Voss & Pearcy, 1990)
- Muusoctopus clyderoperi (O'Shea, 1999)
- Muusoctopus eicomar (Vega, 2009)
- Muusoctopus eureka (Robson, 1929)
- Muusoctopus fuscus (Taki, 1964)
- Muusoctopus hokkaidensis (Berry, 1921)
- Muusoctopus januarii (Hoyle, 1885)
- Muusoctopus johnsonianus (Allcock, Strugnell, Ruggiero & Collins, 2006)
- Muusoctopus karubar (Norman, Hochberg & Lu, 1997)
- Muusoctopus leioderma (Berry, 1911)
- Muusoctopus levis (Hoyle, 1885)
- Muusoctopus longibrachus (Ibáñez, Sepúlveda & Chong, 2006)
- Muusoctopus oregonae (Toll, 1981)
- Muusoctopus oregonensis (Voss & Pearcy, 1990)
- Muusoctopus profundorum (Robson, 1932)
- Muusoctopus pseudonymus (Grimpe, 1922)
- Muusoctopus rigbyae (Vecchione, Allcock, Piatkowski & Strugnell, 2009)
- Muusoctopus robustus (Voss & Pearcy, 1990)
- Muusoctopus sibiricus (Loyning, 1930)
- Muusoctopus tangaroa (O'Shea, 1999)
- Muusoctopus tegginmathae (O'Shea, 1999)
- Muusoctopus thielei (Robson, 1932)
- Muusoctopus violescens (Taki, 1964)
- Muusoctopus yaquinae (Voss & Pearcy, 1990)
