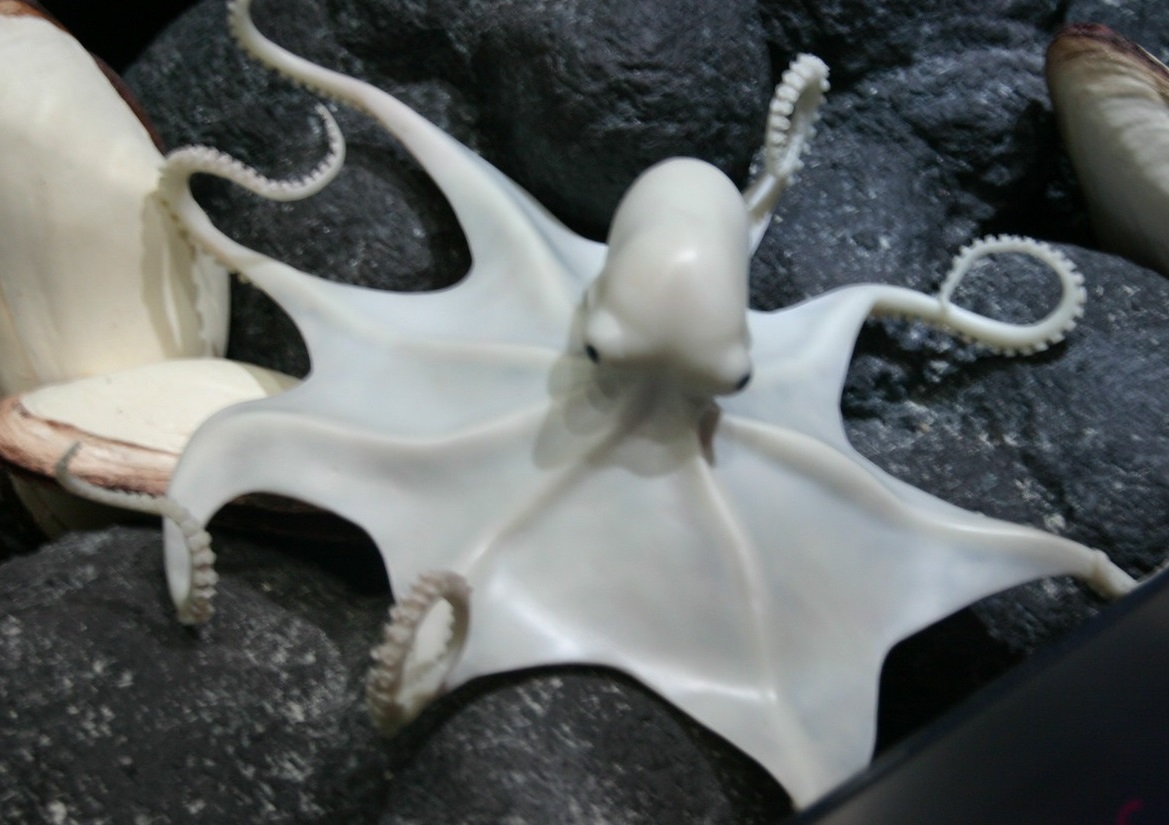

Conservation status
- Least Concern (IUCN 3.1)

Scientific classification
- Kingdom: Animalia
- Phylum: Mollusca
- Class: Cephalopoda
- Order: Octopoda
- Family: Enteroctopodidae
- Genus: Vulcanoctopus; González & Guerra, 1998
- Species: V. hydrothermalis

Binomial name
- Vulcanoctopus hydrothermalis González & Guerra, 1998

= Vulcanoctopus =

Species of benthic octopus

Vulcanoctopus hydrothermalis, also known as the vent octopus, is a small benthic octopus endemic to hydrothermal vents. It is the only photographed species of the genus Vulcanoctopus. Other species such as Vulcanoctopus tangaroa and Vulcanoctopus tegginmathae have been accepted but are near undocumented. This vent octopus is endemic to the hydrothermal vent habitat that is located in the East Pacific Rise.

V. hydrothermalis has evolved unique adaptations to accommodate for the distinct circumstances of this very dynamic habitat. In particular, they are characterized as having double rows of suckers on each arm. V. hydrothermalis has been shown to exhibit feeding that relies on the coordination of their arms to entrap their prey. In terms of external appearance, both the female and male vent octopuses exhibit similar physical traits. Internally, the anatomy of the reproductive and digestive tract is different between female and male vent octopuses.

== Habitat ==
Vulcanoctopus hydrothermalis lives along the East Pacific Rise which borders the Pacific, Cocos, and Nazca Plates. The vent octopus is found near colonies of giant tube worms, which are located at hydrothermal vents. These environments are made very hostile as hot water rises through vents, releasing a black 'cloud,' or plume, of metal sulfides and other toxic chemicals that result in acidic conditions. The temperature of the hydrothermal vent in the East Pacific Rise varies from 1–10 °C (34–50 °F) depending on its surroundings of seawater or plumes and is around 2,640 metres (8,660 ft) deep. V. hydrothermalis are regarded as the only cephalopod endemic to this environment. The vent octopus has been observed to congregate around vents, but isolated elsewhere. It is because of this close proximity that V. hydrothermalis are thought to be more prone to infections by the parasite Genesis vulcanoctopusi, which is described further in Host-Parasite Relationships.

== Description ==
The morphology of Vulcanoctopus hydrothermalis is characterized by some unusual traits. Due to the selection pressures of the deep sea, V. hydrothermalis has adapted traits in response to these unique conditions. One such adaptation is that they do not have an ink sac. Additionally, its dorsal arms are longer than the ventral arms and feature biserial suckers. Overall, V. hydrothermalis has a mean total length of 184 mm (7.2 in).

The first female V. hydrothermalis was discovered at the Gromit hydrothermal vent site in 2004 and captured for comparison against the male species. The ratio of recovered individuals is skewed towards males, indicating fewer females or spatial segregation by sex. The female was found to have similar external characteristics to males, but differed in its reproductive and digestive systems. Unlike the digestive systems of this male vent octopus, the females lacked the appearance of dark swelling. Females also lack spermathecae, which internally holds spermatophores.

== Behavior ==
Vulcanoctopus hydrothermalis' primary defense mechanism against a predator is to freeze in place. The secondary defense involves pushing away from the bottom of the seafloor and then drifting back down once the threat has dissipated. V. hydrothermalis uses its front arms (I dorsal and II dorsolateral) to detect and catch prey. The back arms (III ventrolateral and IV ventral) function to support the weight of the vent octopus and move it forward. This species has not been observed to use jet propulsion. One specimen exhibited "tactile feeding," using its dorsal arms to sense prey while crawling on the seabed. It attempted to seize a crab with arms I and II, but aborted the capture upon realizing the crab's large size, subsequently altering its course.

As for reproductive behavior, five mature specimens were observed displaying a reproductive patterns described as "mounting" or "mating at a distance." Three specimens were observed mounting a fourth while a fifth mated from a distance using its hectocotylus. The transparency of their skin allowed the observers to note their sexual maturity without specimens being gathered.

== Predator-prey relationships ==
Its confirmed prey consist of the amphipod and crab, which are thought to be their primary food sources. Analyzing the materials within the digestive tracts of Vulcanoctopus hydrothermalis, researchers believe that these vent octopuses engage in a foraging behavior and feed on large aggregates of amphipods. At 2,620 m (8,600 ft) depth, the HOV Alvin has captured video evidence of V. hydrothermalis wrapping their arms around these bathypelagic amphipods. Specifically, they coordinate their arms in a starburst pattern to form a water-filled web and engulf their prey. Considering the fact that this predator-prey relationship has been predominantly observed around the hydrothermal vent site in the East Pacific Rise, researchers propose that sulfide spires located along the hydrothermal vent may serve to benefit V. hydrothermalis' predatory behavior. The current hypothesis is that the spires enable the octopuses to effectively grip onto this section of the vent and gain access to the dense aggregations of their prey.

== Host-parasite relationships ==
Genesis vulcanoctopusi, a copepod parasite, is described from Vulcanoctopus hydrothermalis. An endoparasitic relationship is characterized by the presence of all copepodid stages, found within the connective tissue beneath the epithelium of V. hydrothermalis' head and mantle. The parasitism leads to structural integrity loss in the V. hydrothermalis' tissue, with signs of compression, deformation, and mechanical disruption due to the copepods' presence, which causes significant cell-mediated immune response by cephalopod amoebocytes.
