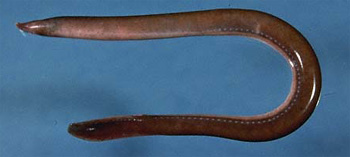

Conservation status
- Least Concern (IUCN 3.1)

Scientific classification
- Kingdom: Animalia
- Phylum: Chordata
- Infraphylum: Agnatha
- Class: Myxini
- Order: Myxiniformes
- Family: Myxinidae
- Genus: Myxine
- Species: M. glutinosa

Binomial name
- Myxine glutinosa Linnaeus, 1758

Synonyms
- Gasterobranchus glutinosus (Linnaeus, 1758); Gastrobranchus coecus Bloch, 1791; ?Myxine glutinosa var. septentrionalis Putnam, 1874; Myxine glutinosa var. limosa Putnam, 1874; Myxine glutinosa var. australis Putnam, 1874; Myzinus glutinosus (Linnaeus, 1758); Petromyzon myxine Walbaum, 1792

= Myxine glutinosa =

Species of jawless fish

Myxine glutinosa, also known as the Atlantic hagfish, is a type of jawless fish belonging to the class Myxini.

== Description ==
The Atlantic hagfish may grow up to .75 metres (2 1/2 ft) long, with no eyes and no jaws; its star-shaped mouth is surrounded by 6 mouth barbels. Their eyes also lack a lens and pigment (features found in the eyes of all other living vertebrates). There is a single gill slit on each side of the eel-like body. It has a total of 88–102 pores from which it can exude a slimy mucus. Hagfish have very flexible bodies which allow them to manipulate themselves into knots. The knots created by the hagfish remove mucus from the body, allow them to escape tight spaces, and pull potential prey from burrows, and because they have no opposable jaws it helps create leverage while they eat.

=== Similar species ===
A related species, the Gulf hagfish (Eptatretus springeri), occurs in the Gulf of Mexico. To distinguish these two types of hagfishes, we can look at their lateral line and eyes, the Myxine glutinosa has no lateral line system and also an unpigmented, cornea-like window in the skin overlying the eye.

== Distribution ==
The distribution of Myxine glutinosa in the eastern Atlantic Ocean extends from the western Mediterranean Sea and Portugal to the North Sea, Skagerrak, Kattegat and the Varanger Fjord. It is also found in the western Atlantic Ocean from Baffin Island, Canada south to North Carolina. They live on muddy ocean floors at depth ranges of about 20 to 1000 meters.

== Biology ==
Like most fish that live on the bottom of the ocean, the Atlantic Hagfish's body color on the dorsal side varies depending on the color of the bottom of the ocean. The most common colors are brown, reddish or purplish, brown, or grey; for the ventral side, the color will be paler.

There are differences in the lateral line system among different types of hagfish as well. Instead of having a simple form of a lateral system like the hagfish Eptatretus, an adult Myxine glutinosa has no lateral line system.

The Atlantic Hagfish has many unique features. Plenty of discussions on the evolutionary morphology of the Myxine glutinosa eyes occur, with some scientists trying to compare it with the retina of lampreys. The Atlantic Hagfish possesses a more ancestral vertebrate eye form, and the lamprey possesses a more derived form. Other scientists have suggested that the Atlantic Hagfish may have possessed more complex eyes that regressed due to environmental factors like little to no light or the need for burrowing. Besides the fact that the eyes of Myxine glutinosa lack both a lens and a vitreous body, experimental studies carried out by Newth and Ross (1955) also suggested that the eye of Myxine glutinosa lacks a photoreceptive function. Kaj Holmberg has described how each hagfish species has differentiated external appearances, and Myxine glutinosa has an unpigmented, cornea-like window in the skin overlying the eye. Finally, some previous works on Myxine glutinosa have led to the conclusion that the retina in these animals is functionless, but the electro-physiological experiments by Kobayashi (1964) showed the eye of Myxine garment (a closely related species) can respond to light stimulation, which may suggest that Myxine glutinosa could respond to light stimulation.

The respiratory anatomy of Myxine glutinosa is similar to other hagfish, with a single, median nostril at the tip of the snout surrounded by two pairs of barbels. During the respiratory process, water will flow into this median nasal to the pharynx and reach every gill pouch.

=== Mucus ===
The Atlantic Hagfish are known for their ability to produce slime: a thick, transparent gel that is cohesive and substantial. Myxine glutinosa can secrete 2 types of slime: the epidermal mucus and the extruded slime. Epidermal mucus helps the prevention of pathogens and is produced all the time while extruded slime is only observed during feeding, provocation, or stress. This slime is not produced by the hagfish directly. The glands inside the hagfish's body excrete "pre-slime", which are protein molecules that can expand in volume when reacting with water. In producing the slimes. "threads" that are produced by the thread cells in their gland that will unravel when they touch the seawater. When those 2 substances mix at the same time with the seawater, the slime appears in just a fraction of a second.

Different species of hagfish also have different slime compositions as well as slime refilling times. It is believed that it usually takes about 3 to 4 weeks for the slime glands to fully refill. This slime is vital to the survival of the Atlantic hagfish as it can distract and affect predators' respiratory systems, reducing the force of squeezing into big food. When the hagfish no longer need the slime, they will form the "body knot" to scrape off all the slime on the body from the head to the tail.

More recent research has revealed the active hunting activities that this species of hagfish has. Furthermore, although this type of hagfish seems to be primitive, its simple body displays a great amount of dexterity. This is also related to how they can form the body knot- as the previous part indicates, the knot can be forcefully propagated in both directions to escape from predators or gain leverage for tearing apart large chunks of food. This leads to the continuous study of hagfish locomotion and keeps improving our understanding of the collective diversity in elongated animals.

There are additional differences in the lateral line system among different types of hagfish. Instead of having a simple form of a lateral system like the hagfish Eptatretus, an adult Myxine glutinosa has no lateral line system.

Scientists often compare Hagfish and lampreys since both are referred to as jawless fish (agnathans). They are the only survivors from the Agnathan stage during the vertebrate evolution. Gnathostomes (jawed vertebrates) also share a common ancestor with those hagfish.

== Reproduction ==
While there are no documented answers as to how hagfish reproduce, some scientists suggested that the Atlantic hagfish's reproduction takes place at a depth of more than 30 fathoms (55 meters) and the eggs are fertilized externally and anchored by hooks not far from where they were extruded. Although some elements are still missing, there are some pieces of new evidence saying that the Atlantic hagfish may have a seasonal reproductive cycle. This evidence includes data corresponding to gonadal reproductive stages. This recent data provides important information for the East Coast Fisheries Management Department as there aren't many policies regarding fishing on these hagfish.

== Ecology ==
The Atlantic hagfish, M. glutinosa, can be found within the Gulf of Maine at depths greater than 50, with soft bottom sediments. The hagfish usually occupy shallow burrows parallel to the surface. The environment they prefer usually contains a high volume of clay, silt, sand, or gravel and this explains why we usually find a muddy and flocculent layer covering these substrata. This layer reduces the friction on hagfish skin. The Atlantic hagfish has additional adaptations to the hypoxic environment, such as a larger blood volume, about 3 times that of other fishes. Its notochord is also studied a lot due to the unique characteristics of the unusual biochemical, molecular, and biomechanical properties. Some reasons for the unique kinematic characteristics of the Atlantic hagfish swimming are also related to its notochord physical properties.

The Atlantic Hagfish, Myxine glutinosa has a scavenging feeding style and they primarily feed on dead or dying marine animals. Some recent studies also suggest that they are more likely an opportunistic feeder as they will eat smaller crustaceans and worms. Moreover, Myxine glutinosa will also bury themselves in the mud to rest like other hagfishes during the day and emerge out at night to hunt. They have an excellent sense of smell and touch. And when they are eating, the hagfish will first protract and retract their plates to create a hole for securing purposes. The consuming process begins with them entering the existing hole and they also prefer to eat from inside their prey. These hagfish used to be believed to be parasites due to this behavior.

When it comes to its tolerance towards the water parameters, the Atlantic hagfish cannot stand sudden changes in temperature but the range of their tolerances on temperature can vary from 0 °C to 20 °C, the Atlantic hagfish is generally believed to be the species that can tolerate the coldest temperatures from 0–4 °C. And for salinity, it is a limiting factor for all hagfish, the Atlantic hagfish favors ppt at around 32 to 32ppt or a little bit above. From previous studies, a salinity of 20–25ppt is lethal to those hagfish and with a salinity of 29–31 ppt they can survive a few weeks but won't eat anything at all. For the Atlantic Hagfish, salinity changes are just as lethal as the temperature, when M. glutinosa is exposed to salinities below 31ppt they will start struggling and become moribund.

As for the predation of the Atlantic Hagfish. Some predators that consume M. glutinosa are Harbor porpoise (consumes more adult hagfish), and Codfish, with many other fishes that feed on small hagfish eggs.

The Atlantic hagfish population is hard to estimate due to their burrowing habits. This is further tested by scientists when they placed bait, Cole (1913) states that 'they may be as plentiful as earthworms'. There were also shifts in the population, their population is currently affected by changes in local ecosystems, substrate alternation, and fishing pressure.

== Conservation ==
Although the Atlantic hagfish are in IUCN's Least Concern group, it is important to keep their Population. This is also related to their limited reproduction potential.

There are also no specific conservation actions on the Atlantic Hagfish.

== Relationship with humans ==
In an experiment, scientists used the Atlantic hagfish as a bioindicator species to test multiple sites in the Skagerrak Strait for chemical contamination from shipwreck-deposited chemical warfare agents.
