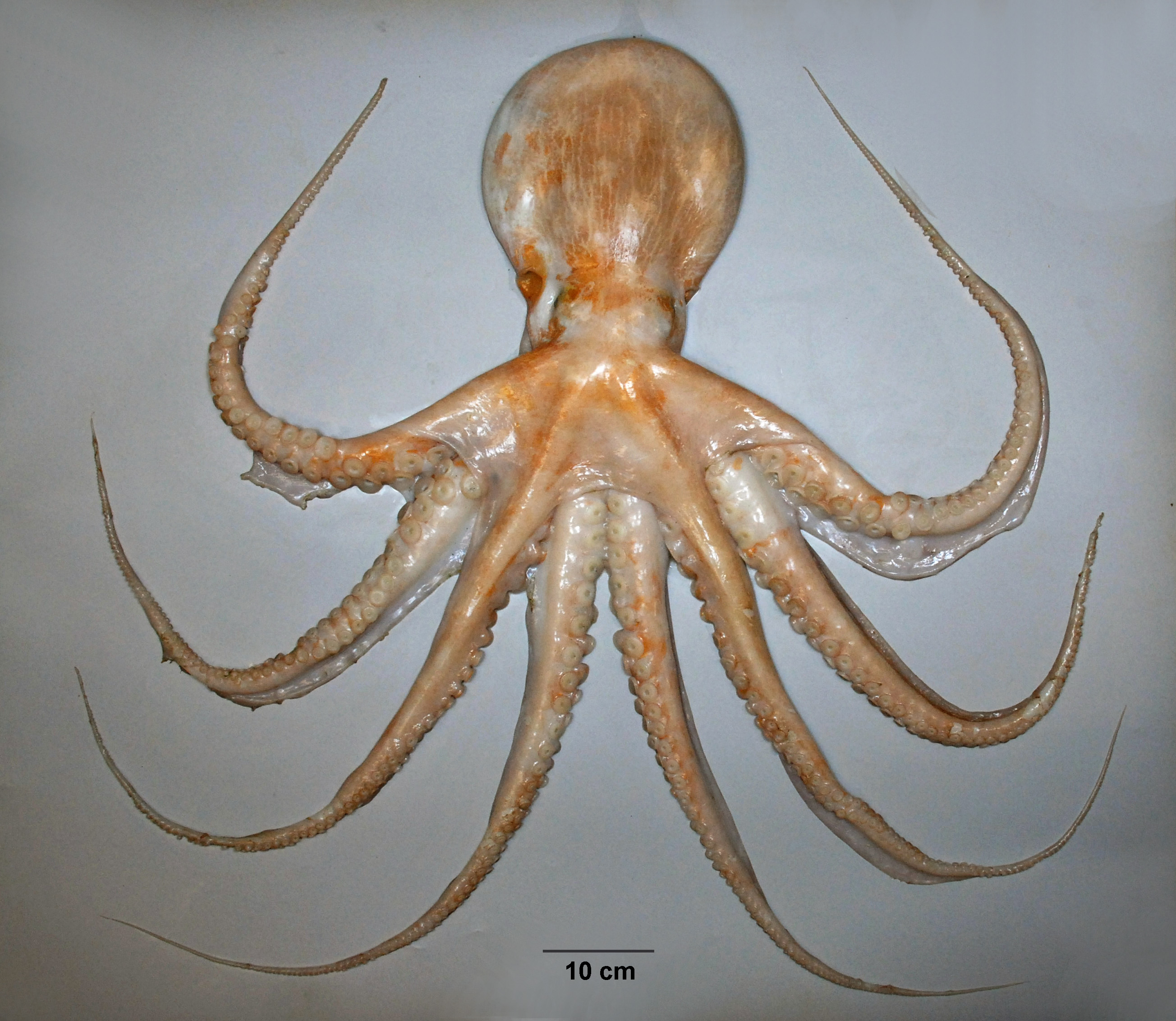
- Enteroctopus zealandicus

Scientific classification
- Kingdom: Animalia
- Phylum: Mollusca
- Class: Cephalopoda
- Order: Octopoda
- Superfamily: Octopodoidea
- Family: Enteroctopodidae; Strugnell, Norman, Vecchione, Guzik & Allcock, 2014

Type genus
- Enteroctopus Rochebrune & Mabille, 1889

= Enteroctopodidae =

Family of molluscs

Enteroctopodidae is a small family of octopuses. This family was formerly considered a subfamily of the family Octopodidae sensu lato but this family has now been divided into a number of separate families with Enteroctopodidae as one of them.

== Genera ==
These genera are included in the family Enteroctopodidae:

- Enteroctopus Rochebrune & Mabille, 1889
- Muusoctopus Gleadall, 2004
- Sasakiopus Jorgensen, Strugnell & Allcock, 2010
- Teretoctopus Robson, 1929
- Vulcanoctopus González & Guerra, 1998
