= Jules François Mabille =

French malacologist, biologist and zoologist

- Born: 5 December 1831; Tours, France
- Died: 18 January 1904 (aged 72); Paris
- Known for: Discovery of many species of mollusc
- Scientific career
- Fields: Malacologist, biology, zoology
- Author abbrev. (zoology): Mabile (spelt like that in the list, but maybe an error)

Jules François Mabille (Tours, 5 December 1831 − 18 January 1904) was a French malacologist, biologist and zoologist who in many trips around the world discovered and studied many species of mollusc.

In 1882−83 Mabille participated in the French scientific expedition to Cape Horn and the South Seas, with his fellow malacologist Alphonse Trémeau de Rochebrune and they described many new species of mollusc. His extensive research was written up in 1889.
